= Great Barrier Reef (disambiguation) =

The Great Barrier Reef is the world's largest coral reef system off the coast of Australia.

Great Barrier Reef may also refer to:

== Places ==
- Hamilton Island Airport, sometimes referred to as Great Barrier Reef Airport, an airport in Queensland
- Great Barrier Reef Marine Park, a marine protected area

== Arts and entertainment ==
- Great Barrier Reef (2012 TV series), with Monty Halls
- Great Barrier Reef (2015 TV series), with David Attenborough
- The Great Barrier Reef: Biology, Environment and Management, a 2007 non-fiction book by Pat Hutchings, Mike Kingsford, and Ove Hoegh-Guldberg
- "The Great Barrier Reef", an episode from Peppa Pig

== See also ==
- Barrier reef (disambiguation)
- Barrier Reef (TV series)
- GBR (disambiguation)
- Great Barrier (disambiguation)
