= Barrier =

A barrier or barricade is a physical structure which blocks or impedes something.

Barrier may also refer to:

== Places ==
- Barrier, Kentucky, a community in the United States
- Barrier, Voerendaal, a place in the municipality of Voerendaal, Netherlands
- Barrier Bay, an open bay in Antarctica
- Barrier Canyon, the former name of Horseshoe Canyon (Utah)
- Barrier Mountain, the former name of Mount Baldy (Alberta)
- Barrier Ranges, a mountain range in New South Wales, Australia
- Division of Barrier, a former Australian Electoral Division in New South Wales
- The Barrier, a common synonym for the city of Broken Hill, New South Wales

- The Barrier Miner, the city's newspaper
- Barrier Highway, in Australia, from SA to NSW via Broken Hill

- The Barrier, a lava dam in British Columbia, Canada
- The Barrier (Kenya), an active shield volcano in Kenya
- The Barrier, an early name for the Ross Ice Shelf, Antarctica

== In arts and entertainment ==
=== Film ===
- The Barrier (1917 film), a lost 1917 American silent drama film
- The Barrier (1926 film), a silent film
- The Barrier (1937 film), an American film
- Barrier (film), a 1966 Polish film, released in the U.S. as Barrier
- The Barrier (1972 film), an Egyptian film; see Gheorghe Dinică
- The Barrier (1979 film), a Bulgarian film
- The Barrier (1990 film), a Bahraini film

=== Games ===
- Barrier (video game), a 1979 arcade game by Vectorbeam

=== Music ===
- Barriers (album), by Frank Iero (2019)
- "Barrier", a 1985 song by Simon Townshend on the album Moving Target
- "Barriers", a song by Suede on their 2013 album Bloodsports
- "Barrier", a track from the soundtrack of the 2015 video game Undertale by Toby Fox

=== Television ===
- Barriers (TV series), a UK television series
- The Barrier (TV series), a 2020 Spanish-language dystopian drama TV series

== Other uses ==
- Barrier (surname)
- Barrier (computer science), a type of synchronization in parallel computing
- Barrier (video game), a 1979 maze arcade game
- Barrier Air, a New Zealand airline
- Barrier cream, hand cream
- USS Barrier, a minesweeper in the U.S. Navy
- Barrier option, a type of financial derivative
- Blood–brain barrier, protects the brain from any dangerous substances in the blood

== See also ==
- Concrete barrier (disambiguation)
- Great Barrier (disambiguation)
- Barrière (disambiguation)
- Barrier Lake (disambiguation)
