= The Last of Us season 1 =

The Last of Us
- Season 1
- Cover art of the DVD and Blu-ray release
- Showrunners: Craig Mazin; Neil Druckmann
- Starring: Pedro Pascal; Bella Ramsey
- No. of episodes: 9

Release
- Original network: HBO
- Original release: January 15 – March 12, 2023

Season chronology
- Next → Season 2

The first season of the American post-apocalyptic drama television series The Last of Us was originally broadcast on HBO between January and March 2023. Based on the video game franchise developed by Naughty Dog, the series is set twenty years into a pandemic caused by a mass fungal infection, which causes its hosts to transform into zombie-like creatures and collapses society. The first season, based on the 2013 game The Last of Us, follows Joel (Pedro Pascal), a smuggler tasked with escorting the immune teenager Ellie (Bella Ramsey) across a post-apocalyptic United States.

Guest stars include Nico Parker as Joel's daughter Sarah, Merle Dandridge as resistance leader Marlene, Anna Torv as Joel's partner Tess, Gabriel Luna as Joel's brother Tommy, Lamar Johnson and Keivonn Montreal Woodard as brothers Henry and Sam, and Melanie Lynskey and Jeffrey Pierce as resistance leader Kathleen and her second-in-command Perry. One of the most expensive television series, the season was filmed in Alberta from July 2021 to June 2022. Neil Druckmann, who wrote and co-directed the games, assisted Craig Mazin with scriptwriting the season's nine episodes. The score was composed by Gustavo Santaolalla, who composed for the games, and David Fleming.

The Last of Us received acclaim from critics, who praised the performances, writing, production design, and score; several called it the best adaptation of a video game. It was nominated for several awards, including 24 Primetime Emmy Awards and three Golden Globe Awards. Across linear channels and HBO Max, the series premiere was watched by 4.7 million viewers on the first day—the second-biggest for HBO since 2010—and almost 40 million within two months; by May, the series averaged almost 32 million viewers per episode, and became HBO's most watched debut season.

== Cast and characters ==
=== Main ===
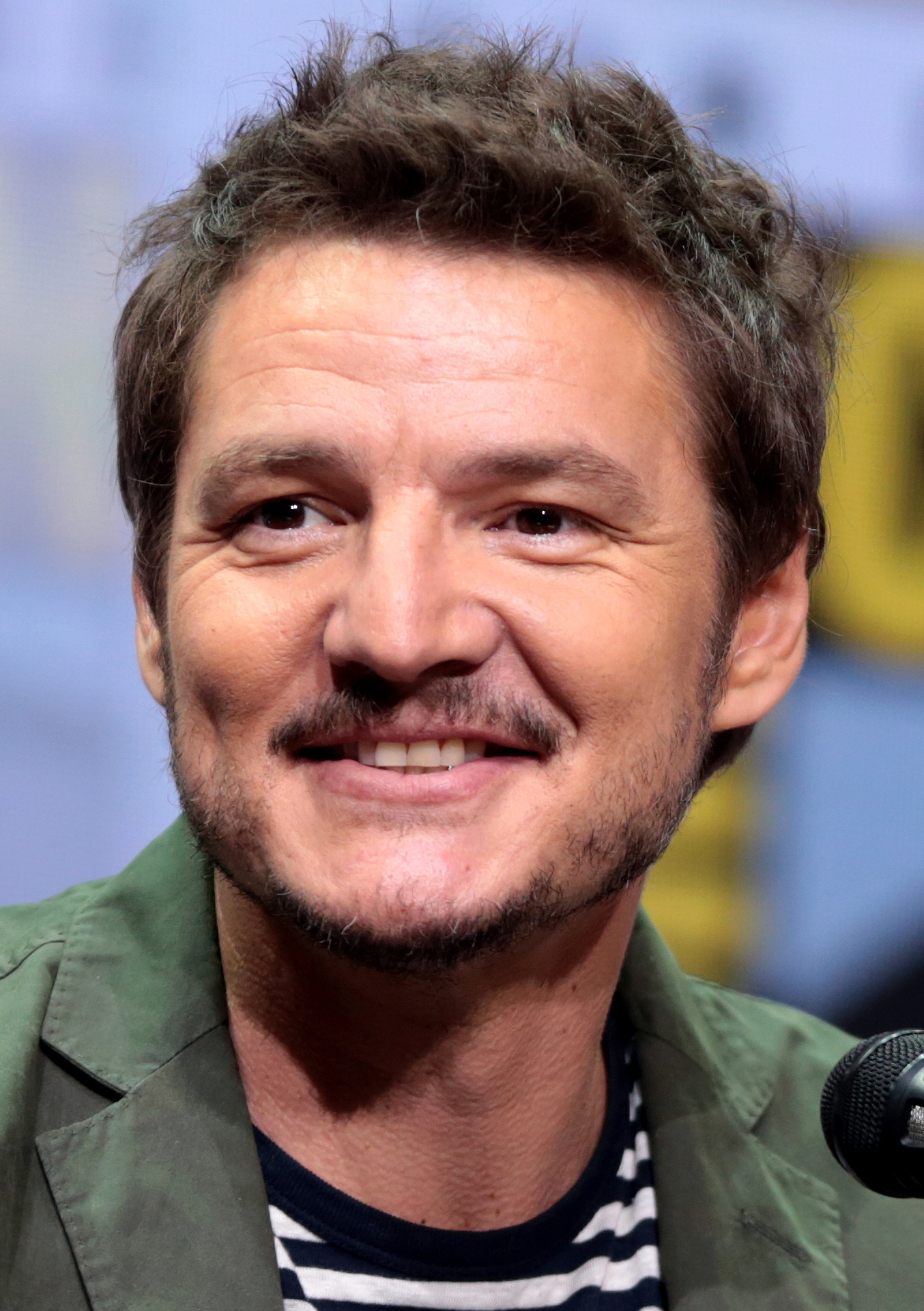
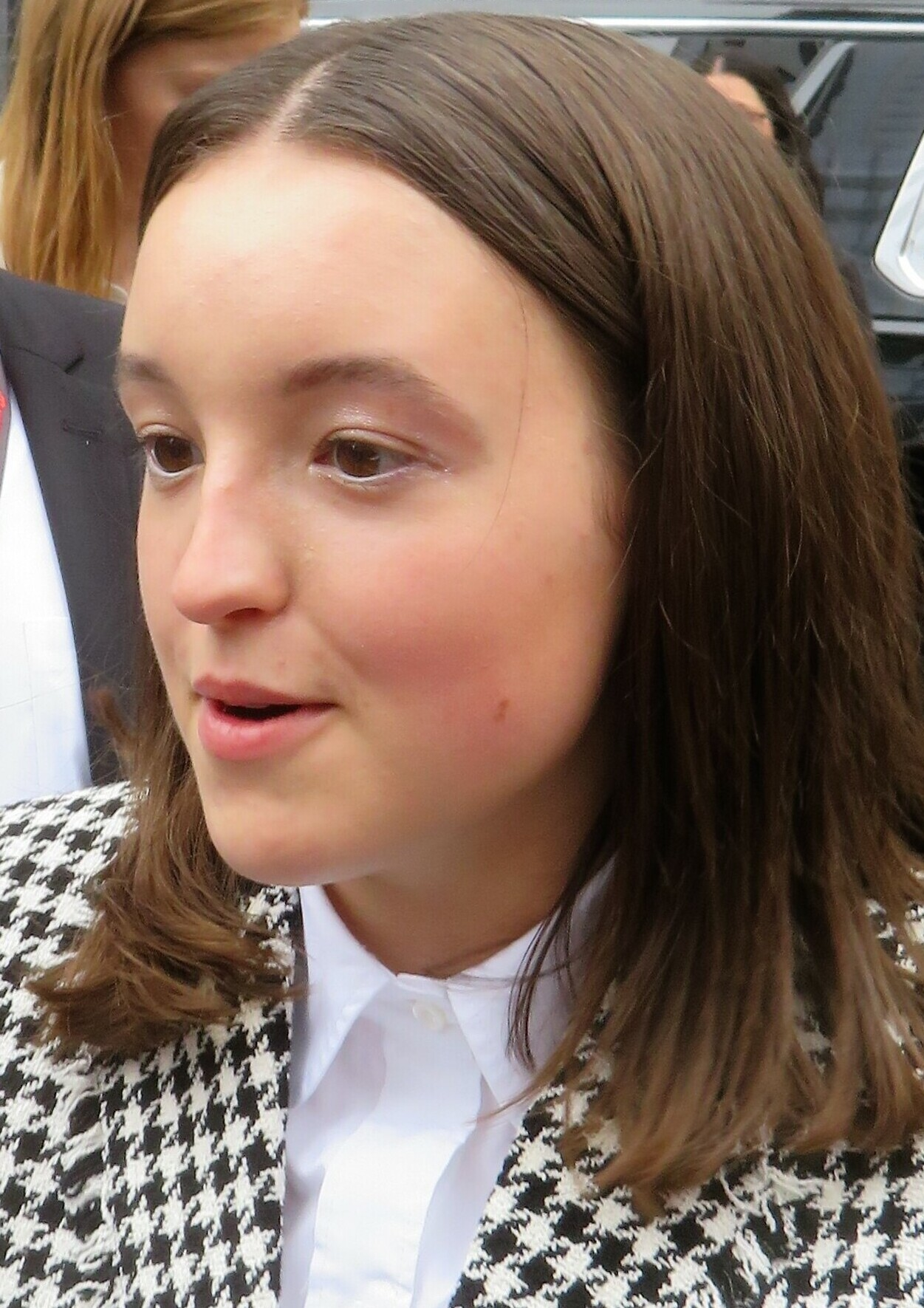
Pedro Pascal and Bella Ramsey portray the lead characters, Joel and Ellie.
- Pedro Pascal as Joel Miller, a hardened middle-aged survivor who is tormented by the trauma of his past. Joel is tasked with smuggling a young girl, Ellie, out of a quarantine zone and across the United States. Joel is portrayed as more physically vulnerable in the series compared to the game—he is hard of hearing in one ear and his knees ache when he stands.
- Bella Ramsey as Ellie, a 14-year-old girl who displays much defiance and anger but has a private need for kinship and belonging. She is strong-willed but has not lost her playfulness, bonding easily with children, and has a fondness for puns. She is immune to the Cordyceps infection and may be the key to creating a vaccine.

=== Recurring ===
- Anna Torv as Tess, a hardened survivor and Joel's partner. Tess is respected in the Boston Quarantine Zone, largely out of fear. She is protective of Ellie during their escort mission.

=== Guest ===
- Nico Parker as Sarah, Joel's 14-year-old daughter. She cares for her father, playfully teasing him over his behavior and attitude.
- John Hannah as Dr. Neuman, an epidemiologist who issues a warning about the threat of fungi during a talk show in 1968.
- Merle Dandridge as Marlene, the head of the Fireflies, a resistance movement hoping to gain freedom from the military. Dandridge reprises her role from the video games.
- Christopher Heyerdahl as Dr. Schoenheiss, an epidemiologist on the 1968 talk show who is skeptical of Neuman's warning.
- Brendan Fletcher as Robert, a thug and black market arms dealer in the Boston Quarantine Zone. Robert fears Joel's retribution against his actions.
- Gabriel Luna as Tommy Miller, Joel's younger brother and who maintains idealism in hoping for a better world. A former Firefly, Tommy gave up on their cause and runs a commune with his wife.
- Christine Hakim as Ratna Pertiwi, a mycology professor who advises the Indonesian government to bomb Jakarta to slow the spread of the infection, for which she feels hopeless.
- Nick Offerman as Bill, a misanthropic survivalist. Bill's paranoia and distrust of the government left him prepared for the pandemic, protected in an underground bunker.
- Murray Bartlett as Frank, a survivalist living in an isolated town with Bill. Frank is friendlier and more trusting than Bill, forming a close bond with Tess and Joel.
- Lamar Johnson as Henry Burrell, who is hiding from a revolutionary movement in Kansas City. Henry is hurt by his own actions but ultimately does them to protect his younger brother Sam.
- Melanie Lynskey as Kathleen Coghlan, the leader of a revolutionary movement in Kansas City. Kathleen is soft-spoken and outwardly sweet but an intelligent and fierce leader.
- Keivonn Montreal Woodard as Sam, a deaf, artistic eight-year-old child who is hiding with his brother Henry. Sam was diagnosed with leukemia at a young age.
- Jeffrey Pierce as Perry, a revolutionary rebel in a quarantine zone who is Kathleen's second-in-command. Pierce portrayed Tommy in the video games. Perry is a former military member.
- John Getz as Eldelstein, a Kansas City doctor who protects Henry and Sam from Kathleen and the rebels.
- Rutina Wesley as Maria, a co-leader of the survivors in Jackson and Tommy's pregnant wife. Formerly an assistant district attorney, Maria is calm and merciful in her decisions.
- Graham Greene as Marlon, a Native American hunter who has lived with his wife Florence in the wilderness of Wyoming since before the pandemic. Marlon is resourceful and untrusting of strangers.
- Elaine Miles as Florence, who lives with her husband Marlon. Florence is calm and humorous. Unlike Marlon, she did not want to isolate in the wilderness.
- Storm Reid as Riley Abel, an orphaned girl who is Ellie's best friend at military school in post-apocalyptic Boston. Riley ran away from military school to join the Fireflies, considering the former to be fascists.
- Scott Shepherd as David, a preacher who leads a struggling community. David is calm and acts as a caring leader, but is manipulative and abusive. He claims to have found God after the outbreak and views the virus as a form of divine justice.
- Troy Baker as James, David's aide. Baker previously portrayed Joel in the video games. James lacks faith in David but wants to be considered his equal, feeling threatened when Ellie's capabilities threaten to usurp his position.
- Ashley Johnson as Anna, Ellie's mother. Johnson previously portrayed Ellie in the video games. Anna is resourceful, killing an infected while giving birth. She is close with Marlene; upon giving birth to Ellie, she tasks Marlene with caring for Ellie after she becomes infected.

== Episodes ==
| No. overall | No. in season | Title | Directed by | Written by | Original release date | U.S. viewers (millions) |
|---|---|---|---|---|---|---|
| 1 | 1 | "When You're Lost in the Darkness" | Craig Mazin | Craig Mazin & Neil Druckmann | January 15, 2023 | 0.588 |
In 2003, a mass fungal infection of mutated Cordyceps sparks a global pandemic and societal collapse. Joel flees from his home in Austin, Texas, with his daughter, Sarah, and brother, Tommy, but Sarah is shot by a soldier. Joel pleads with his "baby girl" as she dies in his arms. Twenty years later, Joel works as a smuggler with his partner, Tess in the Boston quarantine zone (QZ) under authoritarian control of the Federal Disaster Response Agency (FEDRA). When Tommy fails to contact them from Wyoming, Joel and Tess set out to find him. They buy a truck battery from Robert, a local dealer, but he scams them and sells it to the Fireflies, a rebel group opposing FEDRA. While tracking Robert, Joel and Tess encounter the Fireflies' leader Marlene. She hires them to escort a teenage girl named Ellie to the Massachusetts State House in exchange for a working truck. While escaping the QZ, they are intercepted by a FEDRA soldier. He discovers that Ellie is infected, but she claims to be immune. Joel kills the soldier and leads them away.
| 2 | 2 | "Infected" | Neil Druckmann | Craig Mazin | January 22, 2023 | 0.633 |
Two days before the global outbreak, Ratna, a mycologist in Jakarta, Indonesia, analyzes an infected corpse. She reveals that there is no cure and advises military bombings to contain the outbreak. In the present, Ellie explains to Joel and Tess that her immunity might be the key to a cure, which the Fireflies hope to synthesize in a laboratory out west. The path to the State House is blocked by an infected horde, so they cut through a museum but are attacked by blind infected known as "clickers". Ellie is bitten but shows no symptoms, proving her immunity. They arrive at the State House, where the Firefly squadron is dead. Tess reveals she was bitten and, as her dying wish, implores Joel to finish Ellie's mission. As the infected horde swarms the State House, Tess stays behind to destroy it while Joel leads Ellie to safety.
| 3 | 3 | "Long, Long Time" | Peter Hoar | Craig Mazin | January 29, 2023 | 0.747 |
Joel takes Ellie to Lincoln, Massachusetts, hoping to pass her and the mission to his allies Bill and Frank. In a flashback, Frank stumbles upon Bill, a paranoid survivalist who reluctantly takes him in. The two form a romantic relationship, sharing a love of music and food. Years later, Frank contacts Tess by radio and the couples enter a tenuous friendship. In the present, Frank is terminally ill and asks Bill to marry him and assist his suicide. Unable to live without him, Bill takes his life alongside Frank. Joel and Ellie arrive and discover a letter from Bill: he explains that safeguarding Frank gave his life meaning and leaves all his equipment for Joel to protect Tess. Swallowing his grief, Joel reluctantly agrees to bring Ellie with him to find Tommy, hoping he can help them locate the Fireflies. Ellie secretly steals Frank's pistol before she and Joel depart for Wyoming in Bill's truck.
| 4 | 4 | "Please Hold to My Hand" | Jeremy Webb | Craig Mazin | February 5, 2023 | 0.991 |
Joel and Ellie are forced to detour through Kansas City, Missouri, where they are ambushed by bandits. Joel kills two, but Ellie must save him from a third with Frank's pistol. Joel feels guilty for this and apologizes to Ellie. He then counsels her about the firefight and teaches her to use the pistol. The bandits' leader, Kathleen, believes Joel and Ellie to be in contact with a man named Henry and orders a city-wide manhunt. Perry, Kathleen's deputy, discovers something growing under the building, but Kathleen prioritizes the manhunt. Joel and Ellie sleep in a high-rise apartment, hoping to scout a way out of the city, but are awoken by two strangers holding them at gunpoint.
| 5 | 5 | "Endure and Survive" | Jeremy Webb | Craig Mazin | February 12, 2023 (Note: The episode was released online on HBO Max and HBO on Demand on February 10, 2023, ahead of its broadcast on television to avoid conflicting with Super Bowl LVII.) | 0.382 |
The strangers reveal themselves to be Henry and his younger brother Sam. They form a tentative truce with Joel and Ellie and together prepare to escape the city. Ellie and Sam quickly become friends while Henry confesses to Joel that he was responsible for the death of Kathleen's brother, Michael. When Sam developed leukemia, Henry turned Michael over to FEDRA in exchange for medication. After escaping through the tunnels, the group is attacked by a sniper, who calls Kathleen. She arrives with her militia to kill Henry, but a horde of infected emerge from underground, including a large "bloater". Kathleen and Perry are killed while Joel's group escapes seemingly unharmed. However, that night, Sam shows Ellie that he was bitten on the leg. Ellie uses her blood to try to cure him, but wakes the next morning to find Sam infected. He attacks her, but Henry puts down Sam and takes his own life. Devastated, Joel and Ellie bury them and set off for Wyoming on foot.
| 6 | 6 | "Kin" | Jasmila Žbanić | Craig Mazin | February 19, 2023 | 0.841 |
Three months later, Joel and Ellie reach a small, thriving community in Jackson, Wyoming, where Joel is reunited with Tommy and meets his pregnant wife Maria. Ellie learns about Sarah's fate while Joel begs Tommy to take her, fearing that he will fail to protect her. Ellie overhears them and confronts Joel, who changes his mind after reflecting on Sarah. Joel and Ellie travel to Colorado on horseback to discover the Fireflies have vacated their lab, relocating to a hospital in Utah. While they leave the lab, raiders attack and Joel is severely wounded.
| 7 | 7 | "Left Behind" | Liza Johnson | Neil Druckmann | February 26, 2023 | 1.083 |
Ellie shelters Joel in an abandoned house, but as his condition worsens, he urges Ellie to leave him behind. In a flashback, Ellie remembers her best friend Riley, who left FEDRA school to join the Fireflies. Riley returns to visit Ellie and takes her to an abandoned mall, where they explore a carousel, a photo booth, and an arcade. Riley tells Ellie that she is leaving the next day to take a Firefly post in Atlanta. Ellie is distraught but convinces Riley to stay, and they kiss. A dormant infected suddenly attacks and infects them both. Tearfully, they decide to stay together and make the most of their time. In the present, Ellie decides to stay with Joel and finds a sewing needle to stitch his wound.
| 8 | 8 | "When We Are in Need" | Ali Abbasi | Craig Mazin | March 5, 2023 | 1.039 |
Ellie goes hunting to secure food for her and Joel. While tracking a deer, she meets a preacher, David, and his deputy James. Ellie trades her deer for penicillin to treat Joel's wound, which has become severely infected. David reveals the raider Joel killed was a member of his group. He lets Ellie go, but follows her with his team to seek revenge on Joel. Ellie flees to draw them away, but David captures her and reveals he has turned to cannibalism to feed his group. Meanwhile, Joel awakens and tortures some of David's men to locate Ellie. She kills James, but David hunts her down and tries to rape her. Ellie kills David with a meat cleaver and escapes, traumatized. Joel reunites with Ellie and calls her "baby girl" as he comforts her in his arms.
| 9 | 9 | "Look for the Light" | Ali Abbasi | Craig Mazin & Neil Druckmann | March 12, 2023 | 1.040 |
In a flashback, Ellie's mother Anna is bitten by an infected while giving birth. In her final moments, Anna entrusts Marlene, her close friend, to put her down and rescue Ellie. In the present, Joel and Ellie reach Salt Lake City, Utah, where Joel tries to persuade Ellie to abandon the cure mission, but she insists on finishing it. He shares the story of his suicide attempt after Sarah's death and credits Ellie for healing his trauma. They are captured by Firefly soldiers and delivered to the hospital. Joel awakens to Marlene, who explains that the head doctor is preparing Ellie for surgery to synthesize a cure. When Joel learns the procedure will be fatal, he goes on a brutal rampage, slaughtering the Fireflies and their head doctor to rescue Ellie. Marlene intercepts Joel and begs him to let them do the surgery, but Joel kills her. When Ellie wakes, Joel lies that the Fireflies had already failed to develop a cure from other immune patients. At Ellie's demand, Joel swears that this story is true. Ellie replies "Okay".

== Production ==
=== Development ===
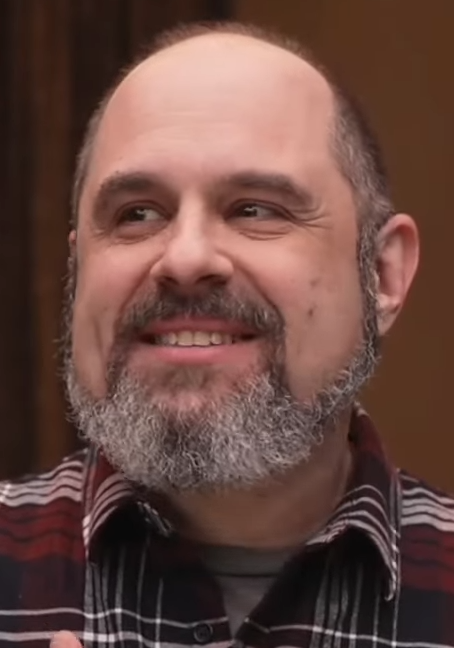
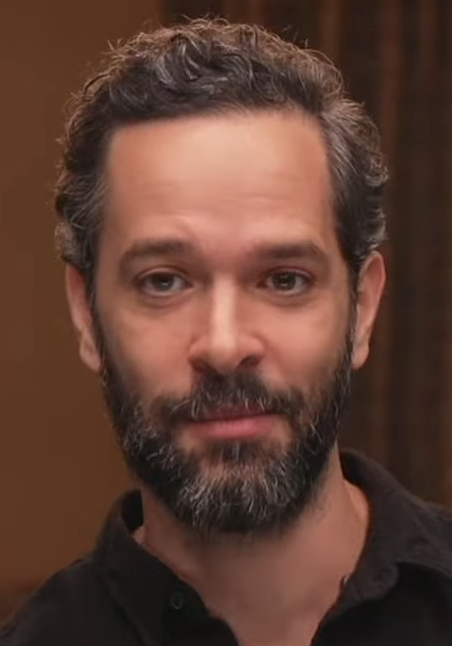
The Last of Us was created by Craig Mazin (left) and Neil Druckmann, who directed the first and second episodes, respectively. Druckmann wrote and co-directed the video game.

A film adaptation of Naughty Dog's 2013 video game The Last of Us was announced in March 2014, to be written by the game's writer and creative director Neil Druckmann; it had entered development hell by 2016, and the partnership ended and rights relinquished by 2019. Due to the extensive development of a film based on Uncharted, another game series by Naughty Dog, Druckmann ensured specific plot points were included when negotiating a deal with film and television studios; he felt more closely connected to The Last of Us's creation and development than Uncharted's and always wanted to be involved in its adaptation in some manner.

Writer and director Craig Mazin was approached in 2018 by PlayStation Productions with a list of games for potential television adaptation; he was disappointed to discover The Last of Us was being adapted into a film at the time as he felt television was a better fit. A fan of the game, having played it about twelve times, Mazin was introduced to Druckmann through Shannon Woodward, a mutual friend, in 2019; Druckmann first showed Mazin in-development scenes from The Last of Us Part II (2020) on July 3, 2019. Druckmann, a fan of Mazin's series Chernobyl, agreed that The Last of Us required a television series's length and pacing. They pitched it to HBO about a week later. HBO chairman and chief content officer Casey Bloys and head of drama programming Francesca Orsi were unfamiliar with the game but trusted Mazin due to his work on Chernobyl and his investment in the story and world.

A television adaptation was announced in the planning stages at HBO in March 2020, expected to cover events of the first game. Mazin and Druckmann were named to write and executive produce the series, while television producer Carolyn Strauss and Naughty Dog president Evan Wells were named executive producers, and Gustavo Santaolalla, who worked on the games, the show's composer. The show was announced as a joint production of Sony Pictures Television, PlayStation Productions, and Naughty Dog; it is the first show produced by PlayStation Productions. It is produced under the company name Bear and Pear Productions. Johan Renck, Mazin's collaborator on Chernobyl, was announced as executive producer and director of the series premiere in June 2020; he dropped out by November due to scheduling conflicts as a result of the COVID-19 pandemic. HBO greenlit the series on November 20. PlayStation Productions's Asad Qizilbash and Carter Swan were named executive producers, and Word Games a production company.

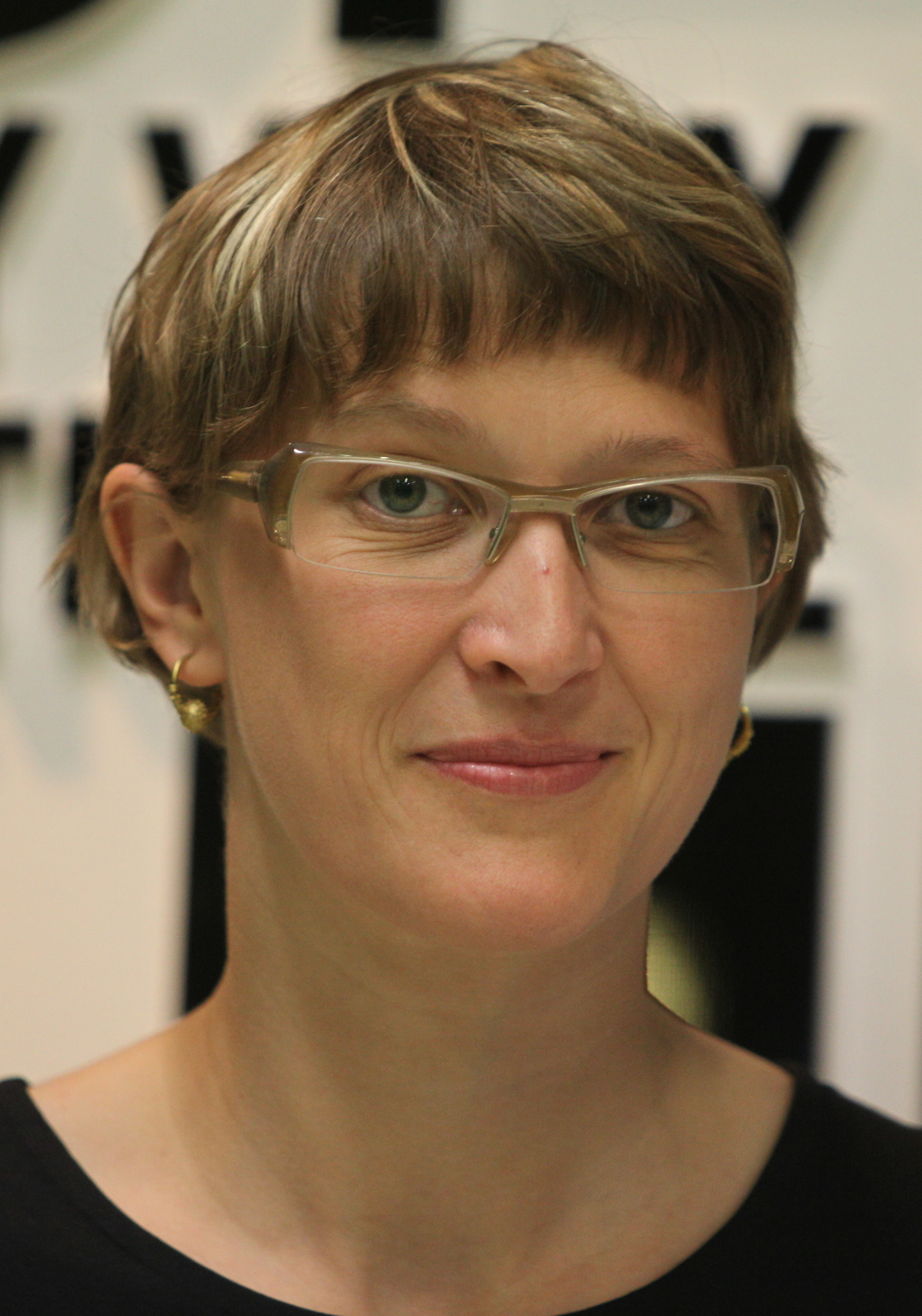
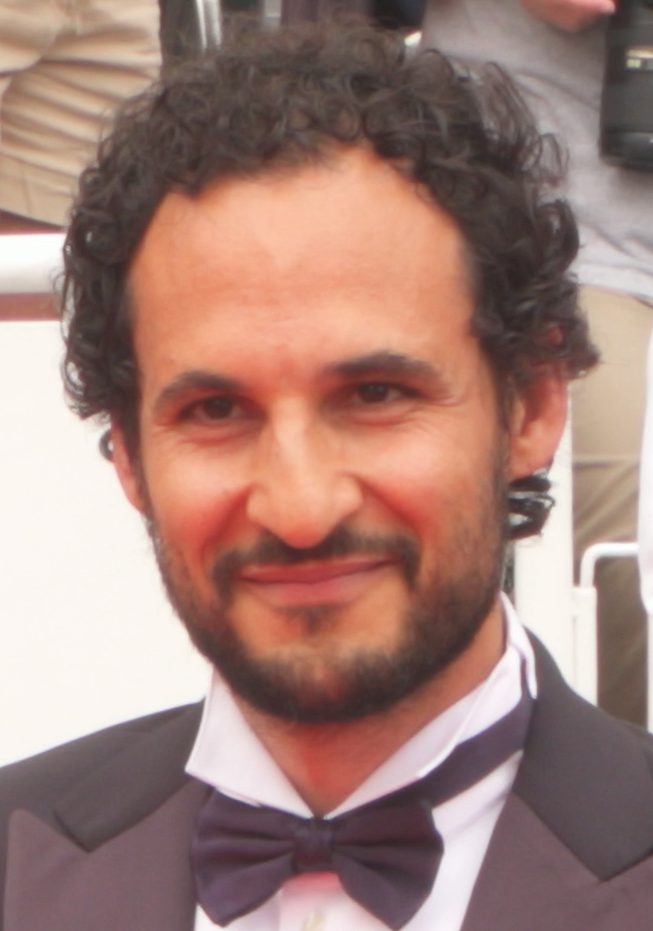
Jasmila Žbanić (left) directed the sixth episode, while Ali Abbasi directed the eighth and ninth.

The Mighty Mint joined production in January 2021 and Kantemir Balagov was announced as the pilot episode's director. He had been interested in adapting the game for years and was set to direct several opening episodes; in October 2022, Balagov said he left the project a year prior due to creative differences. Rose Lam was added as executive producer in February 2021. Pre-production in Calgary, Alberta, began on March 15; Mazin arrived in May. Ali Abbasi and Jasmila Žbanić were announced as directors in April.

In July 2021, the Directors Guild of Canada (DGC) revealed Peter Hoar was assigned to direct, followed in August by Mazin, in September by Druckmann, and in January 2022 by Liza Johnson and Jeremy Webb. In February, Druckmann confirmed he directed an episode and felt his experience reinforced and reflected his experience in directing games. After several months traveling between Calgary and Los Angeles, Druckmann struggled to fulfil obligations at Naughty Dog and returned home to advise remotely, feeling confident in Mazin.

The Last of Us is the largest television production to be filmed in Alberta and possibly the largest in Canadian history, generating CA$182 million for Alberta and creating 1,490 jobs. The first season's budget of over CA$100 million—more than $10 million per episode—exceeded that of each of Game of Thrones's first five seasons, making it one of the most expensive television series. According to Canadian artists union IATSE 212, the production led to a 30% increase in union membership and employment. The season covers the events of the first game and its downloadable expansion The Last of Us: Left Behind (2014). The season's original ten-episode count was reduced to nine during production; the first two were combined after Bloys felt the first would not compel viewers to return. The first season was produced by Greg Spence and Cecil O'Connor. The series was renewed for a second season on January 27, 2023, less than two weeks after it premiered.

=== Casting ===
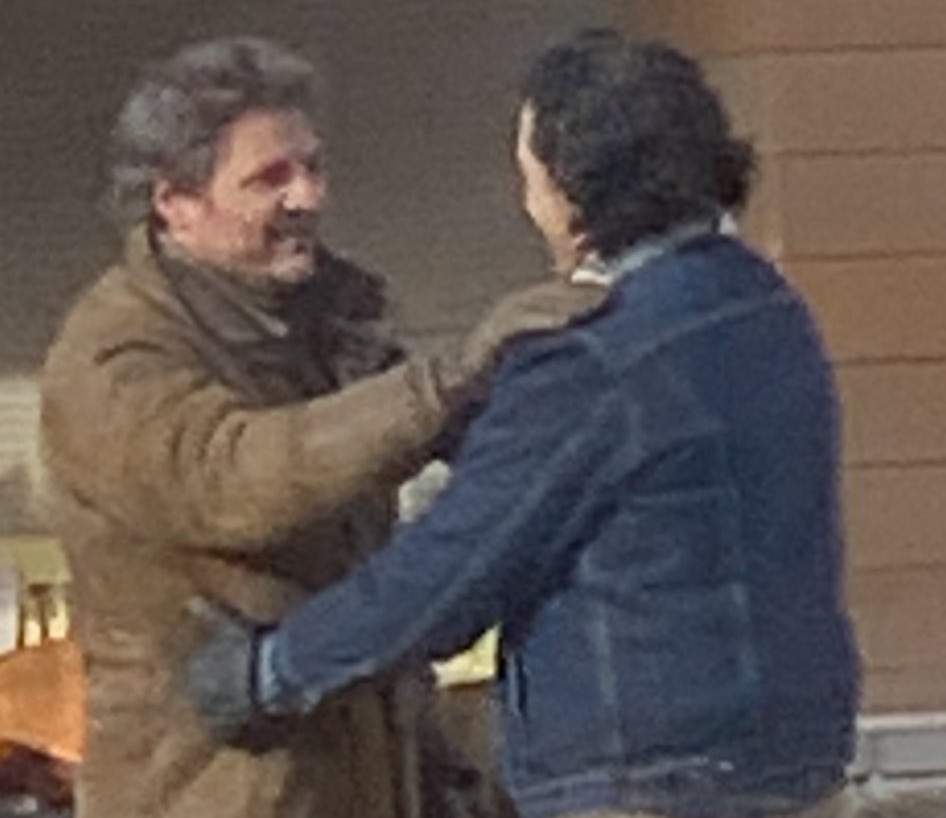
Pedro Pascal (left) and Gabriel Luna (right) on set playing brothers Joel and Tommy in Canmore, Alberta, in November 2021

Casting occurred virtually through Zoom due to the pandemic. Casting director Victoria Thomas wanted to honor the game without being limited by it. On February 10, 2021, Pascal and Ramsey were cast as Joel and Ellie. Mahershala Ali was reportedly considered for Joel, and Mazin spoke with Matthew McConaughey for the role. Candidates considered for Ellie for the canceled film adaptation—such as Maisie Williams and Kaitlyn Dever—had aged out of consideration by the time the series was in production. The producers sought actors who could embody Joel and Ellie individually and imitate their relationship. Though both featured on HBO's Game of Thrones, Pascal and Ramsey had not met before filming The Last of Us but found they had instant chemistry, which developed over production.

Mazin and Thomas sought high-profile guest stars; Thomas said many of the actors "don't usually do one-episode guest spots". Luna's casting as Tommy was announced on April 15, 2021, and Dandridge was confirmed to reprise her role of Marlene from the video games on May 27. In May, Classic Casting circulated a casting call for extras from Calgary, Fort Macleod, High River, and Lethbridge; anyone over 18 could apply, and those with vehicles from 1995 to 2003 were recommended. It was announced Parker was cast as Sarah on June 30. Pierce, Bartlett, and Con O'Neill's casting as Perry, Frank, and Bill was announced on July 15, followed by Torv's as Tess on July 22. On December 7, Bartlett claimed Offerman would appear on the show in a role close to his; two days later, Offerman was announced to be playing Bill, replacing O'Neill who dropped out due to scheduling conflicts. On December 9, Žbanić revealed the casting of Greene, Miles, and Wesley.

Reid's casting as Riley was announced on January 14, 2022. In February, Mazin distributed a casting call for a boy aged 8–14 who is deaf, black, and proficient in American Sign Language or Black American Sign Language; Deaf West Theatre confirmed this was for the character of Sam, to appear in two episodes filmed in March and April. In June, Druckmann announced Baker and Ashley Johnson would star in the series; their character names were revealed in December. Lamar Johnson and Woodard's casting as Henry and Sam was announced in August, alongside the official announcement of Greene and Miles as Marlon and Florence. Lynskey's casting as Kathleen was announced alongside the teaser trailer in September, while Shepherd's casting was revealed in the first trailer in December. Wesley's role as Maria was announced on January 9.

=== Writing ===
A post-apocalyptic drama and thriller, the series was written by Mazin and Druckmann; Mazin wrote all episodes except the premiere and finale, which he co-wrote with Druckmann, and the seventh episode, written by Druckmann. Druckmann was convinced Mazin was the ideal creative partner for the series after witnessing his passion for the game's story; Druckmann referred to Mazin as the story's "co-parent". Mazin said the series may represent a paradigm shift for film and television adaptations of video games due to the strength of the narrative, noting "it would only take [HBO executives] 20 minutes on Google to realize The Last of Us is the Lawrence of Arabia of video game narratives". The writers avoided making "a zombie show", acknowledging the infected creatures were a vessel through which characters are pressured to make interesting decisions and reveal their true selves. While Druckmann was not able to "unplug" from the characters during the games' development due to the medium's immersive nature, he felt he was able to do so when writing for television.

Druckmann felt the most important element of adapting the game was to "keep the soul", particularly character relationships, whereas gameplay and action sequences were of minimal importance. Mazin said the changes were "designed to fill things out and expand". Content cut from the game was added to the show, including the story of Ellie's mother, Anna, which Mazin found "gorgeous". Druckmann said some scripts borrow dialogue directly from the game, while others deviate; some of the game's action-heavy sequences were changed to focus on character drama at HBO's encouragement. He said the series took the opposite approach to adaptation than Uncharted (2022), which tells a new story with game homages to give "an Uncharted flavor", whereas The Last of Us is a closer adaptation, allowing alterations such as changing character perspectives. The writers found the series an opportunity to delve into backstories of characters who the game otherwise ignored, wanting to better understand their motivations. Mazin compared the process to adapting a novel, with identical emotional beats despite different narrative events.

Druckmann was open to changing aspects of the games but wanted a strong reason, ensuring he and Mazin considered impacts on later events. The game's outbreak takes place in 2013 with its post-apocalyptic narrative in 2033; this was changed to 2003 and 2023 as the writers felt matching the story to the broadcast period was more interesting and changed little of the story. They added the outbreak's origins to ground the narrative; following COVID-19, they recognized audiences are more knowledgeable about viral pandemics. Borrowing an approach from Chernobyl, Mazin opened the series with a fictional 1960s talk show explaining the origins of fungal infections, implying humanity knew the potential risk for some time. The writers removed spores—the vector through which infection spreads in the games—and replaced it with tendrils forming a unified network, inspired by the idea of mycelium. They felt spores were an unrealistic threat while an interconnected network increased tension, and gas masks did not translate well into television. Visually, the fungal infection was inspired by jellyfish stings after Žbanić sent an image to Mazin during preproduction.

=== Filming ===
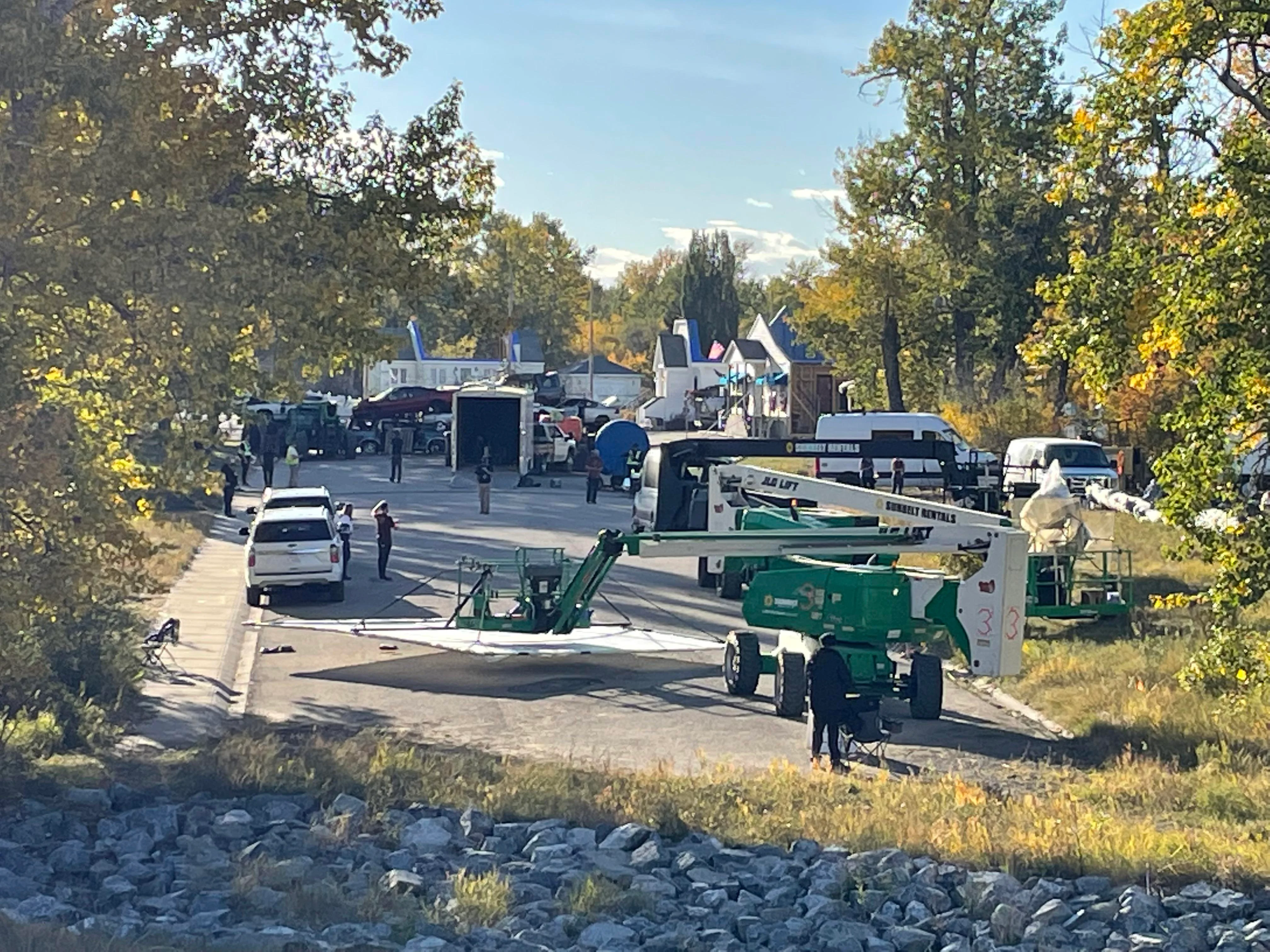
High River

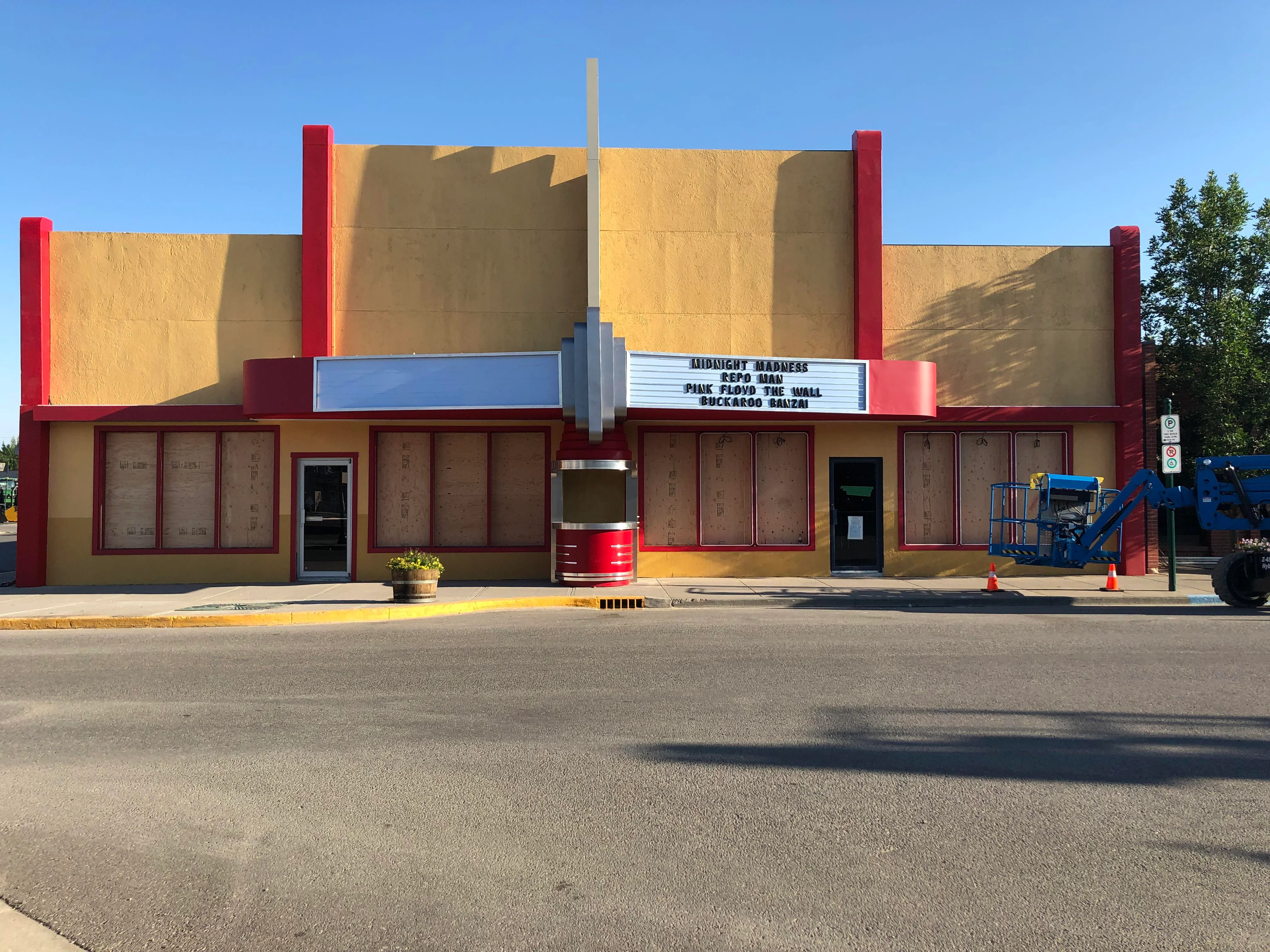
Fort Macleod

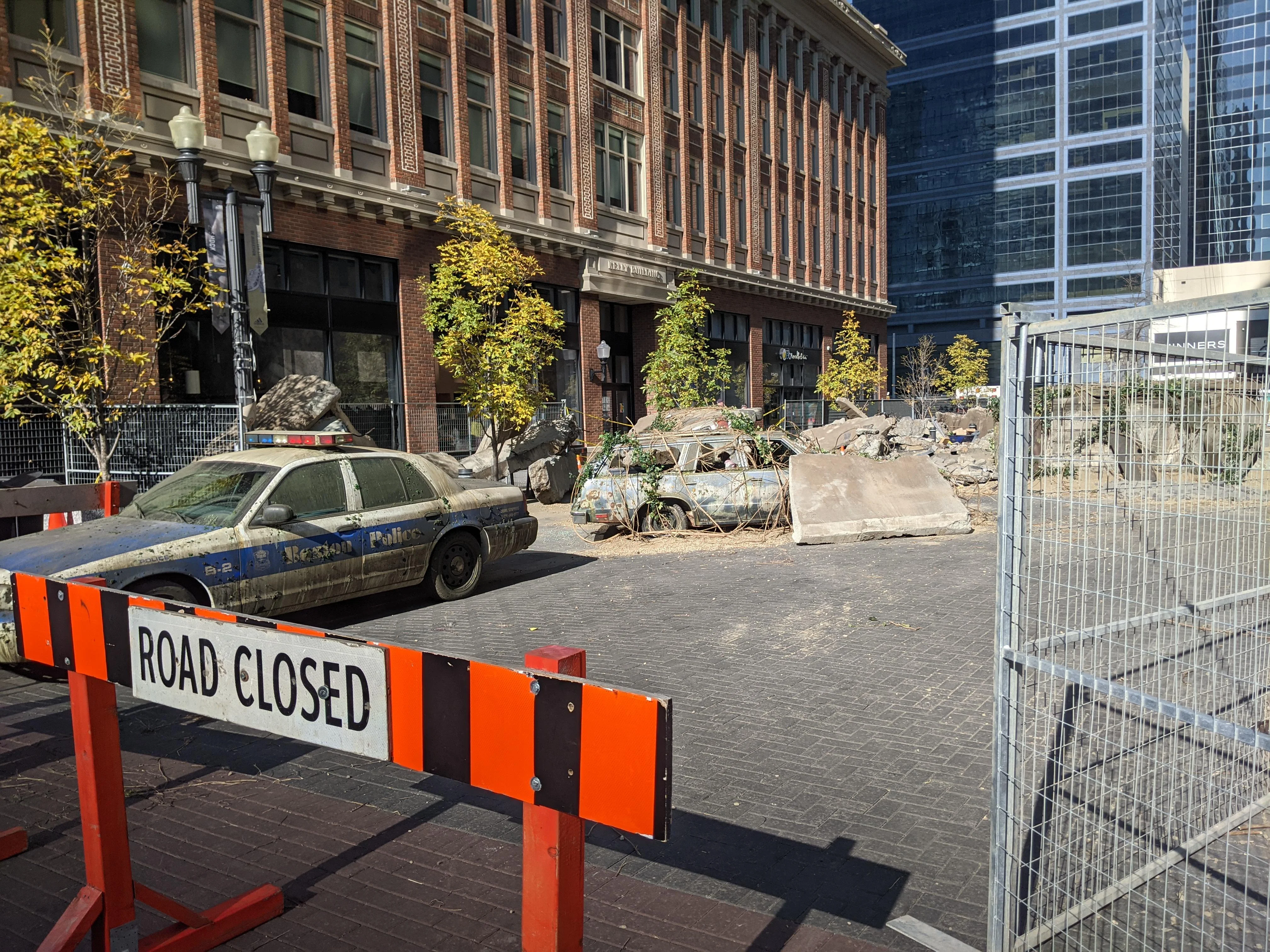
Rice Howard Way, Edmonton

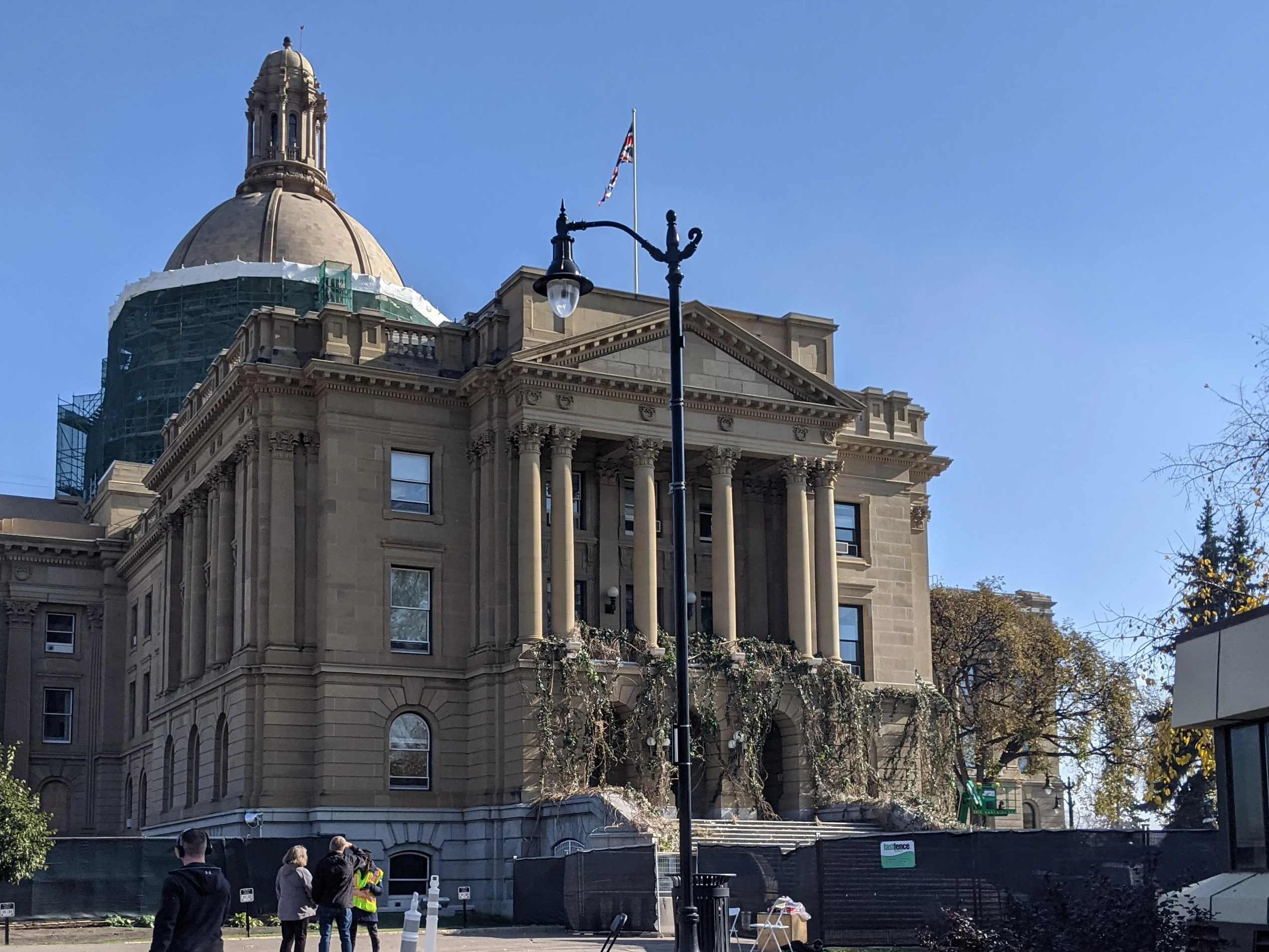
Alberta Legislature Building

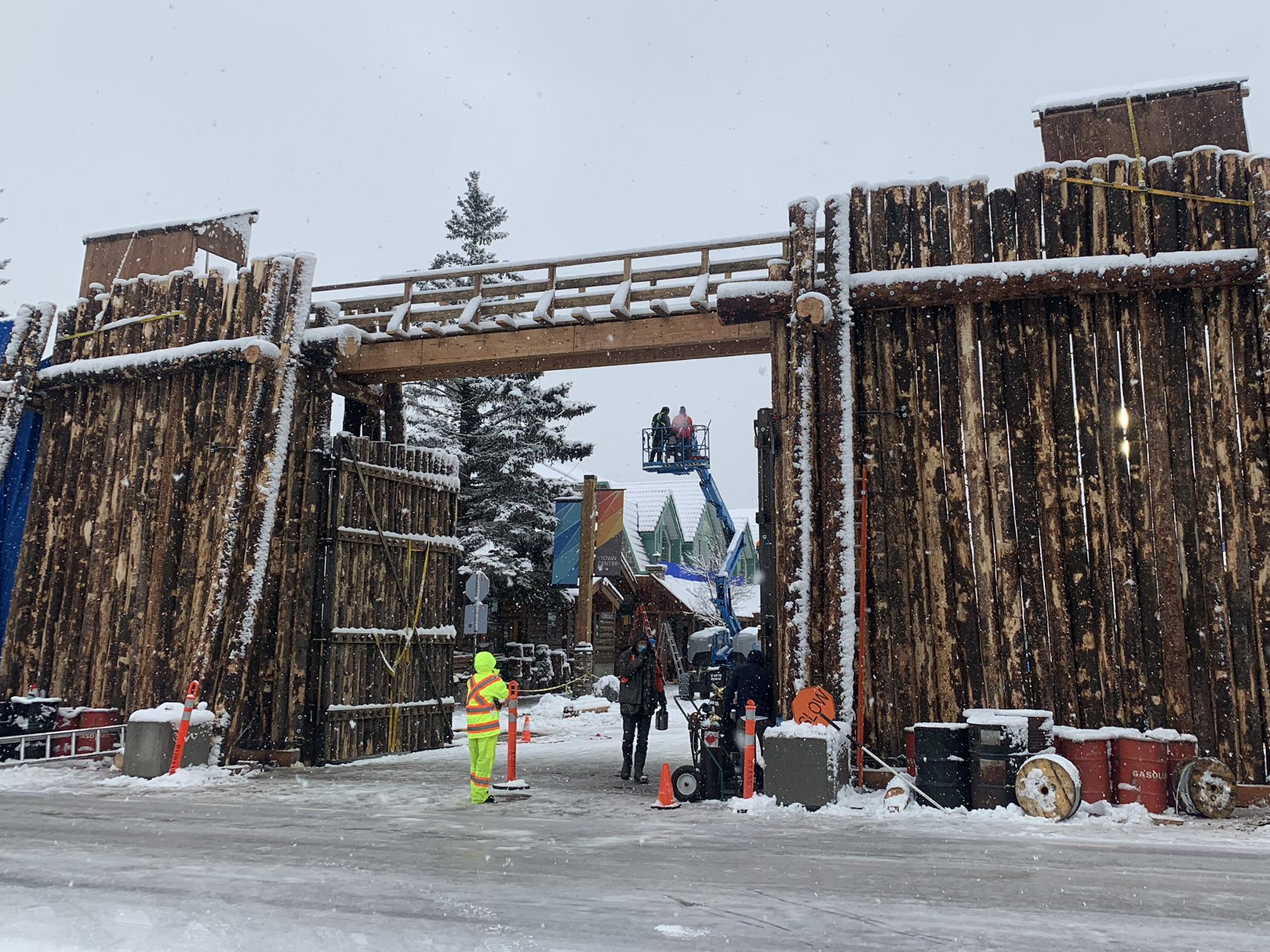
Canmore

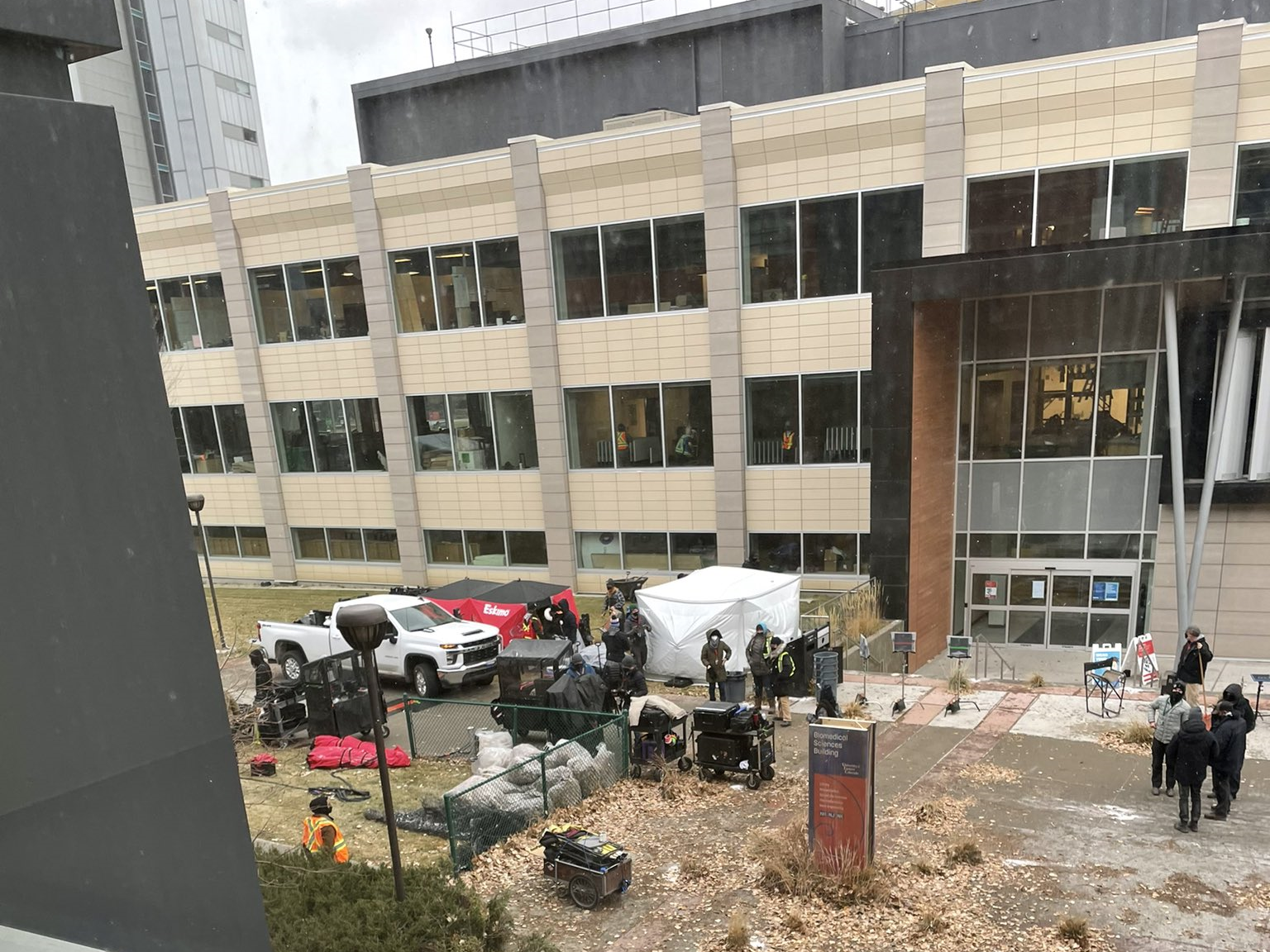
SAIT, Calgary

Filming took place in High River and Fort Macleod in July 2021, in Downtown Edmonton in October, and in Canmore and Calgary in November.

Approximately CA$141 million was spent on production ($71 million on salaries and wages, and $70 million at local businesses) and over 1,000 businesses in Alberta were supported. Calgary officials felt Alberta was chosen for production partly due to the removal of the tax credit cap of CA$10 million per project. Supervising location manager Jason Nolan began preparation work in January 2021, leading a 115-person team that found and transformed more than 180 locations. Due to the COVID-19 pandemic, cast and crew quarantined for two weeks after entering Canada.

Ksenia Sereda worked as cinematographer with Balagov, Mazin, Druckmann, and Johnson, while Eben Bolter worked with Hoar and Webb, Christine A. Maier with Žbanić, and Nadim Carlsen with Abbasi. Sereda, Mazin, and Druckmann worked early to establish the series's visual language, largely referencing the game and its warmer tones. After testing, Sereda opted for an Alexa Mini with Cooke Optics S4/i lenses, maintaining character perspectives while preserving background depth; Bolter found it effective for handheld shots while emulating 35 mm film. The series filmed for 218 days, with around 18–19 days per episode, amounting to 2–3 pages of script per day.

Filming began in Calgary on July 12, a week later than originally scheduled. It moved to High River and Fort Macleod (replicating Austin, Texas) before returning to Calgary in August. Balagov completed production by August 30, and Hoar on October 5. A four-day shoot in Downtown Edmonton in October cost around CA$372,000, including at Rice Howard Way and the Alberta Legislature Building. Filming took place in downtown Calgary and Beltline in October. Druckmann's episode was completed by November 7. Production occurred in Canmore, Alberta (replicating Jackson, Wyoming) and at Mount Royal University and the Southern Alberta Institute of Technology in November. Žbanić completed production by December 9.

In January 2022, Northland Village Mall in northwest Calgary was decorated for production. Filming took place in Okotoks and Waterton Lakes National Park in February, and Airport Trail in northeast Calgary saw three-day closures in March. Webb's episodes entered production in March and continued until the end of principal photography in June. Calgary was used to replicate Kansas City, Missouri, in March. Production continued in Calgary in April and May, including around the Calgary Courts Centre, Kensington, and Victoria Park, and near Barrier Lake and Grande Prairie. Reshoots for Texas scenes took place in Olds in late May and early June, and High River in June. Production concluded in the early hours of June 11, two days later than originally scheduled; Additional photography took place in Kansas City on October 4. Several filming locations subsequently became tourist destinations.

=== Music ===
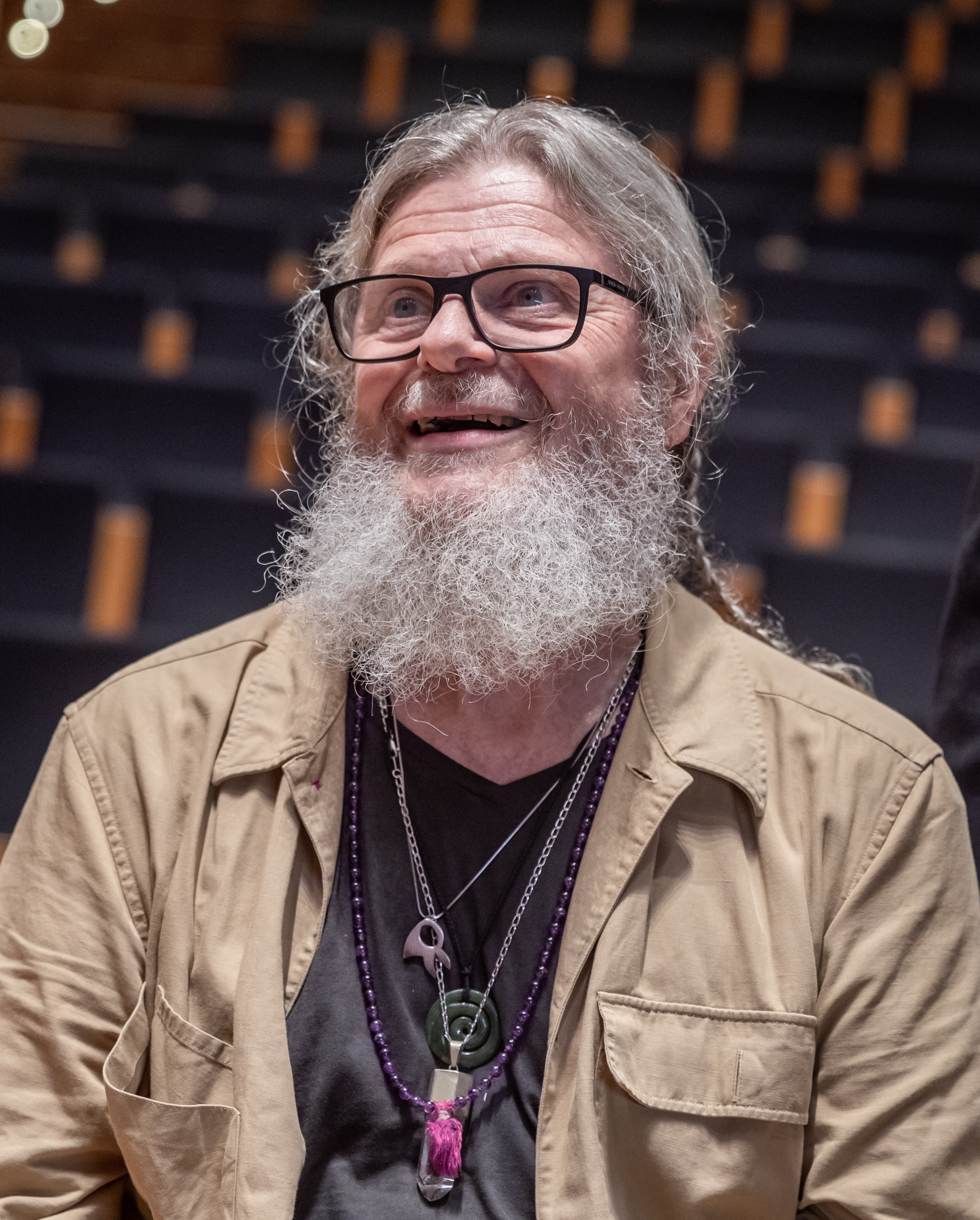
Gustavo Santaolalla, who worked on the video games, composed the score for the television series.

Santaolalla and David Fleming composed the score for the television series; the former wrote its opening theme. He said Latino viewers "will recognize touches" of his music, and drew on his experiences in film and television, having composed the themes and some tracks for Jane the Virgin (2014–2019) and Making a Murderer (2015–2018). He primarily recrafted his previous work instead of creating new music, focusing on elements he found interesting. Fleming's work was inspired by real-world sounds within a decayed civilization. A 66-track soundtrack album for the series was released digitally on February 27.

The first episode uses songs like "Tomorrow" by Avril Lavigne and "White Flag" by Dido to foreshadow Sarah's fate and Joel's character arc. Its final scene and credits feature the song "Never Let Me Down Again" by Depeche Mode, which Mazin chose due to its blend of upbeat sounds and dark lyrics; the song returned in the sixth episode, performed by Mazin's daughter Jessica, to demonstrate Ellie feeling let down by Joel. The third episode uses "Long, Long Time" by Linda Ronstadt, which exhibits themes of unfulfilled love and how time heals wounds, echoing Bill and Frank's relationship. Streams of the song increased significantly following the episode's broadcast; several outlets compared it to the 2022 resurgence of Kate Bush's "Running Up That Hill" after its use in the fourth season of Stranger Things.

The fourth episode's title references the lyrics of "Alone and Forsaken" by Hank Williams, which is used in the episode; it was previously used in the original game and one of its trailers, and a trailer for the television series. The seventh episode features "All or None" by Pearl Jam to represent Ellie's loneliness and uncomfortability, reuses Etta James's version of "I Got You Babe" from The Last of Us: Left Behind as its romantic lyrics hidden by joyous music mirrored the feelings of Ellie and Riley, and uses A-ha's "Take On Me" to reflect their feelings towards each other and illustrate Ellie's journey; a cover version of "Take On Me" was used in a trailer for the series, and Ellie performs the song in The Last of Us Part II.

=== Design ===
The production team included five art directors and hundreds of technicians. The game's art director, concept artists, and environment artists provided feedback on costumes and sets. Costume designer Cynthia Ann Summers found the series more difficult than outfit-focused media like fantasy or period pieces as the costumes had to be integral to the story without standing out. She ensured Joel's outfits demonstrated a lack of consideration, as he places little thought into his appearance; Mazin demanded specific colours. Summers required around 30 duplicates of each outfit to account for elements like blood and dirt progression, stunt doubles, and reserves. The breakdown department, responsible for disfiguring outfits as required by the story, was led by Sage Lovett. At Mazin's request, Summers and her team focused on minor details relevant to apocalyptic settings, like shoelaces replacing belts. Pascal and Ramsey were happy to wear regular outfits as they had both worked on science-fiction and period pieces.

Production designer John Paino referenced the video game but focused on references used by Naughty Dog during development. He created an image collage which included a photograph of reassembled chairs, which Mazin considered the show's mandate: "the built world is unbuilt and rebuilt". Paino found several Canadian towns had similarities to American architecture, particularly Texas. He was unable to locate empty and abandoned buildings or location imitating Boston's brick-lined streets for the first two episodes, requiring manual transformation and constructions. Paino and his team constructed the Boston quarantine zone near Stampede Park over several months for the first episode, the town of Lincoln in around six to twelve weeks for the third, and the Kansas City cul-de-sac in nine weeks for the fifth. The team engaged mostly Canadian staff, including Alberta-based Paul Healy as the season's set decorator.

Barrie and Sarah Gower, with whom Mazin had worked on Chernobyl, were engaged to create the prosthetics for the infected. Barrie Gower appreciated the series avoided "stereotypical zombies—the pronounced cheekbones, sunken eyes, lots of blood and gore". The production team created a large reference library for "fuzz, slime mold, shelf mushrooms, button mushrooms, different textures and colors". Mazin wanted the clickers to resemble the in-game design through prosthetics; he felt using visual effects would have lessened their impact. Their team found themselves continually referring to the original concept art from the game. For the approximately 70 actors portraying the infected mob in the fifth episode, 70 artists applied prosthetics to about 30 people in each three-hour shift. The 40 kilograms (88 lb) bloater suit was coated in a gel-like liquid during filming to appear wet and reflective. Paul Becker and Terry Notary choreographed the series. Notary wanted the creatures' movements to imitate each other, akin to schools of fish; for the fifth episode, he set up a boot camp to prepare the actors for the role. Misty Lee and Phillip Kovats, who had worked on the games, (Note: In addition to providing clicker noises, Phillip Kovats was the audio director of the first game.) returned to voice the clickers for the series.

=== Post-production ===
The series was edited by Timothy A. Good and Emily Mendez over 18 months; Mark Hartzell edited the second episode, and Cindy Mollo edited the eighth. After Mazin worked on Chernobyl, Good expressed interest in collaborating; the two had been friends for some time. A different editor was employed for The Last of Us but departed due to scheduling conflicts; Good joined the series after finishing work on the third season of The Umbrella Academy. He started with the third episode, with Mendez as his assistant editor. Good showed her work to Mazin, and they agreed for Mendez to co-edit the seventh episode as it adapted Left Behind, her favorite part of the games; She continued as Good's co-editor for the fifth, sixth, and ninth episodes. Good chose not to play the game and let the dailies instruct his emotional instincts; Mendez and Mazin gave him details when necessary. Mendez was tasked with the temporary sound design, using her own library and sound effects from the game. Good used Santaolalla's soundtrack from the game as the temp score during editing and found it influenced his decisions.

Sixteen visual effects teams worked on the series, supervised by Alex Wang. The season had over 3,000 visual effects shots; most episodes had around 250. The 650-person team at DNEG worked on 535 shots for the series over 18 months, primarily focusing on environmental effects, including the scenes set in Boston, Kansas City, Jackson, and Salt Lake City; field trips were conducted to gather resources, and the team regularly referenced the video games. The visual effects teams consulted with Naughty Dog's concept artists when creating the infected, and used timelapse videos of Cordyceps growth as animation references. All studios worked on the fifth episode's action sequence; the episode had around 350 to 400 visual effects shots. Wētā FX created the infected effects; 50 to 70 creatures were digitally added to the horde. Design studio Elastic created the show's title sequence to demonstrate the "unrelenting nature" of the fungus; creative directors Andy Hall and Nadia Tzuo researched fungi to ensure an accurate depiction and movement. They pitched several ideas to Mazin and Druckmann before settling on the realistic depiction; Mazin enjoyed the idea of the fungus appearing beautiful despite its destructive nature.

== Release ==
=== Broadcast and home media ===
While the series was originally indicated to begin airing in 2022, Bloys denied this in February 2022 and clarified it would begin in 2023, which was confirmed in the first teaser trailer. Following leaks from Sky and HBO Max, on November 2, 2022, HBO announced the series would premiere in the United States on January 15, 2023, and released the first official poster. The season was broadcast on HBO in the United States, and is available to stream in 4K resolution on HBO Max; it was released on Binge in Australia, Crave in Canada, HBO Go and Now TV in Hong Kong, Disney+ Hotstar in India, U-NEXT in Japan, Neon in New Zealand, HBO Go in Southeast Asia and Taiwan, and Sky Group channels and Now in Germany and Austria, Italy, Switzerland, and the United Kingdom and Ireland.

The first episode received its red carpet world premiere in Westwood, Los Angeles, on January 9, followed by theater screenings in Budapest and Sydney on January 11, and New York City on January 12. Behind-the-scenes videos, titled Inside the Episode, were released on HBO Max and YouTube following each episode, and Naughty Dog released Building The Last of Us, featuring interviews with the cast and crew of the series and games. The season was released digitally and on DVD, Blu-ray, and Ultra HD Blu-ray in the United Kingdom on July 17, and in the United States on July 18; a SteelBook version was available in the United Kingdom, and released in the United States on March 18, 2025. The release contains behind-the-scenes featurettes including a short film about adapting the game, a conversation with microbiology and parasitology experts, and the Inside the Episode series. On the Official Charts Company's Video Chart in the United Kingdom, the home media release ranked 32nd in 2023 and 50th in 2024.

American Sign Language (ASL) versions of the episodes, performed by Daniel Durant and directed by Leila Hanaumi, were released on Max on March 31, 2025. It is the first of HBO's original content to have an ASL version, following the success of Barbie (2023), Godzilla x Kong: The New Empire, and Beetlejuice Beetlejuice (both 2024). Hanaumi was assisted by hearing interpreter Ashley Change, and some takes of Durant lasted eight to ten minutes. Hanaumi felt some scenes required focus on precision, such as the sign for "escalator" to avoid confusion with "stairs", and researched the deaf scientific community to better understand how concepts are communicated. Hanaumi and Durant created signs for the infected to emulate their nature and movement. Durant was appreciative of the work as "a gift to my own community"; he felt roles for deaf actors had briefly resurged after the release of CODA (2021), in which he starred, but felt "it became really quiet" after the 2023 SAG-AFTRA strike.

=== Promotion ===
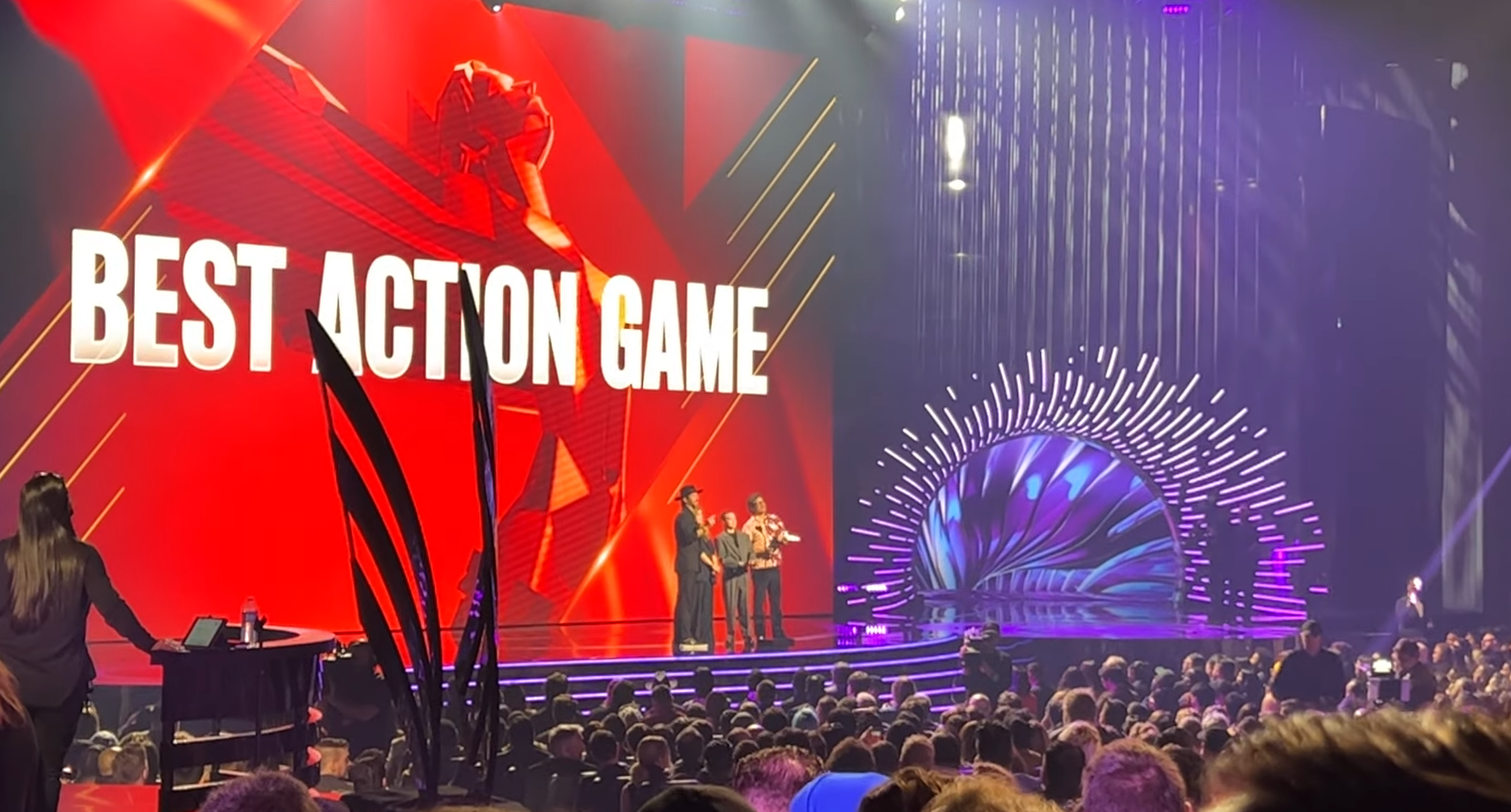
To promote the show, Troy Baker, Ashley Johnson, Bella Ramsey, and Pedro Pascal presented Best Action Game at the Game Awards in December 2022.

The Last of Us's marketing campaign utilised "breadcrumb content": small teases to maintain engagement. Emily Giannusa, HBO vice president of marketing, planned promotional material featuring game comparisons and endorsements from Naughty Dog to prove faithfulness to the source, but discovered it was unnecessary as fans created it themselves. The marketing team conducted social listening from 2020 to identify non-gaming influencers interested in the series, leading to partnerships with celebrities like actress Felicia Day and rapper Logic; custom Carhartt merchandise was sent to fans and influencers who expressed excitement about the series. Based on their experience on Game of Thrones and with its fandom, Giannusa focused promotion around the audience, noting "authentic marketing" requires flexibility based on reactions. Druckmann endorsed social and pre-release content, and Mazin worked directly with the marketing team, including creative director Badger Denehy, who edited several trailers.

For The Last of Us Day on September 26, 2021, HBO shared the first image of Pascal and Ramsey in costume, followed by the first still frame at Summer Game Fest on June 10, 2022. The first footage of the show was revealed in a HBO Max trailer during the premiere of House of the Dragon on August 21, featuring Pascal, Ramsey, Parker, and Offerman. The first teaser trailer for the show was released for The Last of Us Day on September 26, 2022, featuring the first footage of Luna, Dandridge, Torv, and Reid, and confirming Lynskey's casting; the teaser, which used Hank William's "Alone and Forsaken", received over 17 million views in less than 24 hours across Twitter and YouTube, and over 57 million organic views in its first 72 hours, the most-watched promotional video in HBO's history, outperforming House of the Dragon by 50%. A short clip of Joel and Ellie hiding from a clicker was released on November 16 to tease the show's appearance at CCXP the following month. Eleven character posters were released on November 30.

Dandridge, Druckmann, Luna, Mazin, Pascal, and Ramsey appeared on a panel at CCXP on December 3, where the first full trailer was released, revealing the appearances of Shepherd, Baker, and Ashley Johnson; according to Giannusa, this marked the promotional campaign "kicking into high gear" as the series drew discussion from audiences unfamiliar with the games. Giannusa's team noticed broader audiences were drawn towards cast portraying unusual characters, leading to focus on actors like Offerman and Pascal in subsequent marketing. HBO Latin America recreated an overgrown version of the fictional Boston Museum at the Warner Bros. Discovery booth on the CCXP convention floor, featuring clickers and other Easter eggs. This inspired similar installations for the premiere events in London, Los Angeles, and New York, which used 3D scans of infected provided by Barrie Gower. HBO and advertising agency Giant Spoon recreated items from 2003 at the Angelika Film Center in Manhattan for the premiere in January 2023, attended by 1,500 people over seven screenings; attendees were given wearable Firefly pendants.

Pascal, Ramsey, Baker, and Ashley Johnson presented at the Game Awards 2022 on December 8. HBO announced Baker would host a companion podcast alongside the series, featuring Mazin and Druckmann. In January 2023, Pascal and Ramsey were featured on the cover of The Hollywood Reporter, while Pascal was on the cover of Wired. HBO released the first behind-the-scenes featurette on January 6, and several press outlets published interviews with cast and crew based on roundtable discussions from the previous month. Ramsey appeared on Jimmy Kimmel Live! alongside a clip from the series on January 9, and on The Late Late Show with James Corden on January 10. A season trailer was released after the airing of the first episode on January 15. The decision to develop The Last of Us Part I—a remake of the original game—was partly based on the potential to introduce show viewers to the games; it was released for PlayStation 5 in September 2022, and for Windows in March 2023. A two-hour trial was made available for PlayStation Plus Premium members after the season premiere.

To gain momentum, HBO partnered with over 20 international partners to promote the series. Virtual marketing was utilized, including a lens on Snapchat adding post-apocalyptic overgrowth to worldwide landmarks, such as Grauman's Chinese Theatre and the Storting building. Google released an Easter egg in late January, adding mushrooms to the screen when searching for The Last of Us or Cordyceps. On January 27, the first episode was released for free on HBO Max in the United States, and on Sky's YouTube channel in the United Kingdom. To promote the third episode, Bartlett appeared on The Late Show with Stephen Colbert on January 30, and Offerman on Jimmy Kimmel Live! on February 1. Pascal appeared on The Tonight Show Starring Jimmy Fallon on February 2, and hosted Saturday Night Live on February 4; a viral skit from the latter featured Pascal portraying Mario in a "prestige drama" based on the Mario Kart series inspired by HBO's The Last of Us. Pascal appeared on Late Night with Seth Meyers on February 15, The Graham Norton Show on February 24, and Hot Ones on March 9; the release of The Last of Us overlapped the promotion and release of The Mandalorian's third season. A 31-minute special chronicling the production of the series aired on HBO after the finale on March 12. Ramsey appeared on The Jonathan Ross Show on March 18.

== Reception ==
=== Critical response ===
The Last of Us season 1: Critical reception by episode
Percentage of positive critics' reviews tracked by the website Rotten Tomatoes

On review aggregator Rotten Tomatoes, The Last of Us has an approval rating of 96% based on 488 critics' reviews, with an average rating of 8.7 out of 10. The website's general consensus reads, "Retaining the most addictive aspects of its beloved source material while digging deeper into the story, The Last of Us is bingeworthy TV that ranks among the all-time greatest video game adaptations." Metacritic calculated a weighted average of 84 out of 100 based on 44 reviews, indicating "universal acclaim". Several reviewers considered it the best adaptation of a video game, with GameSpot's Mark Delaney saying it "feels like the beginning of a new era" for the genre.

Reviewers praised the differences from the original game's narrative implemented by Mazin and Druckmann, and some believed the scenes lifted directly from the game were among the weakest and led to issues with pacing. Variety's Daniel D'Addario felt the show relied too heavily on action sequences, while TechRadar's Axel Metz wanted more action. IGN's Simon Cardy wrote the series "often shines brightest" during its quietest moments. Critics overwhelmingly considered the third episode the season's best, and some named it among the greatest episodes of television overall. The Hollywood Reporter's Daniel Fienberg felt it elevated the series to a new level, and Empire's John Nugent called it "moving, surprisingly romantic, and one of the finest hours of television in recent memory". Some critics found the first episode well-made but too familiar, and /Film's Valerie Ettenhofer considered it the season's weakest. RogerEbert.com's Brian Tallerico found the final two episodes rushed.

Several critics lauded the production design. Digital Spy's David Opie wrote "every set feels like it was ripped straight out of the game". Conversely, Slant Magazine's Pat Brown felt environments appeared too manicured and carefully placed. Inverse's Dais Johnston praised the use of lighting to highlight the humanity of both the characters and creatures, and called the cinematography "something other video game adaptations could only dream of". TV Guide's Keith Phipps called the series "visually striking", and IGN's Cardy wrote it "is often a sight to behold". Santaolalla's score received praise, with CNET's Sean Keane feeling it added "a yearning of sadness to the narrative".

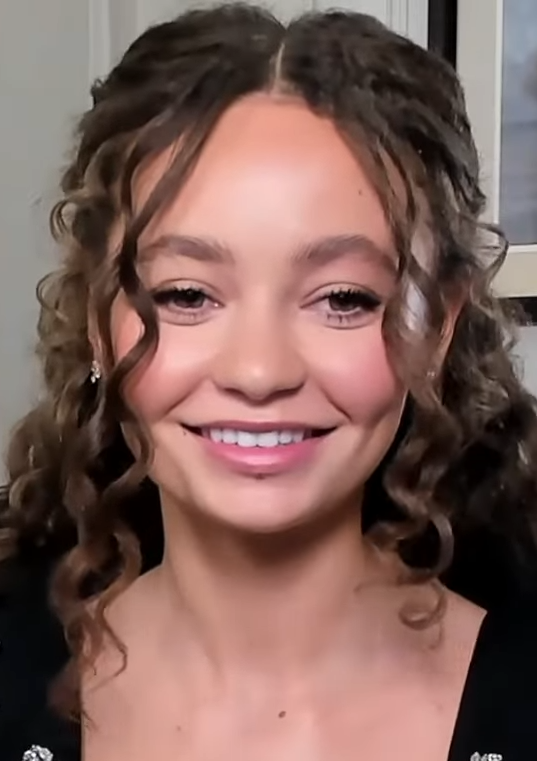
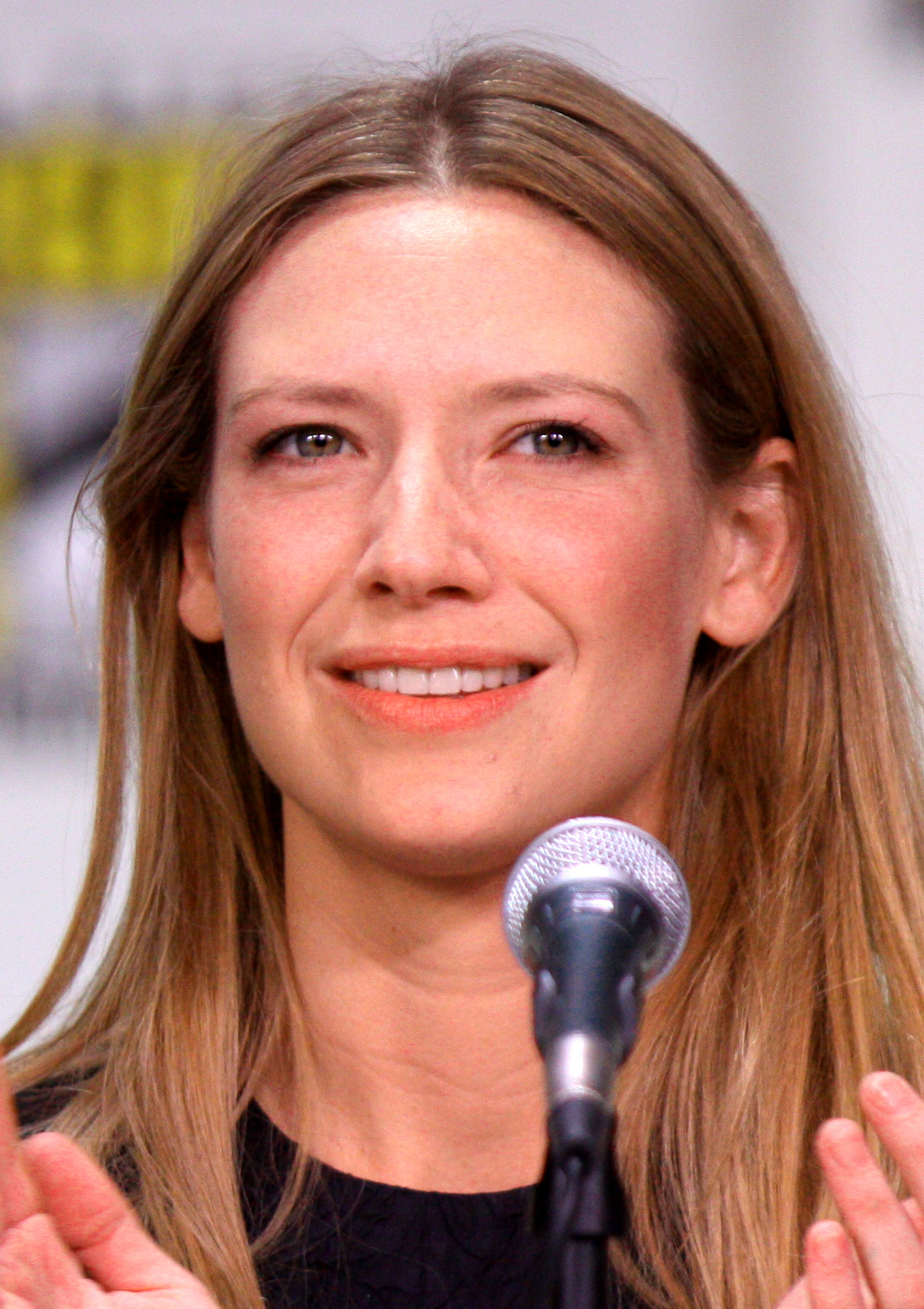
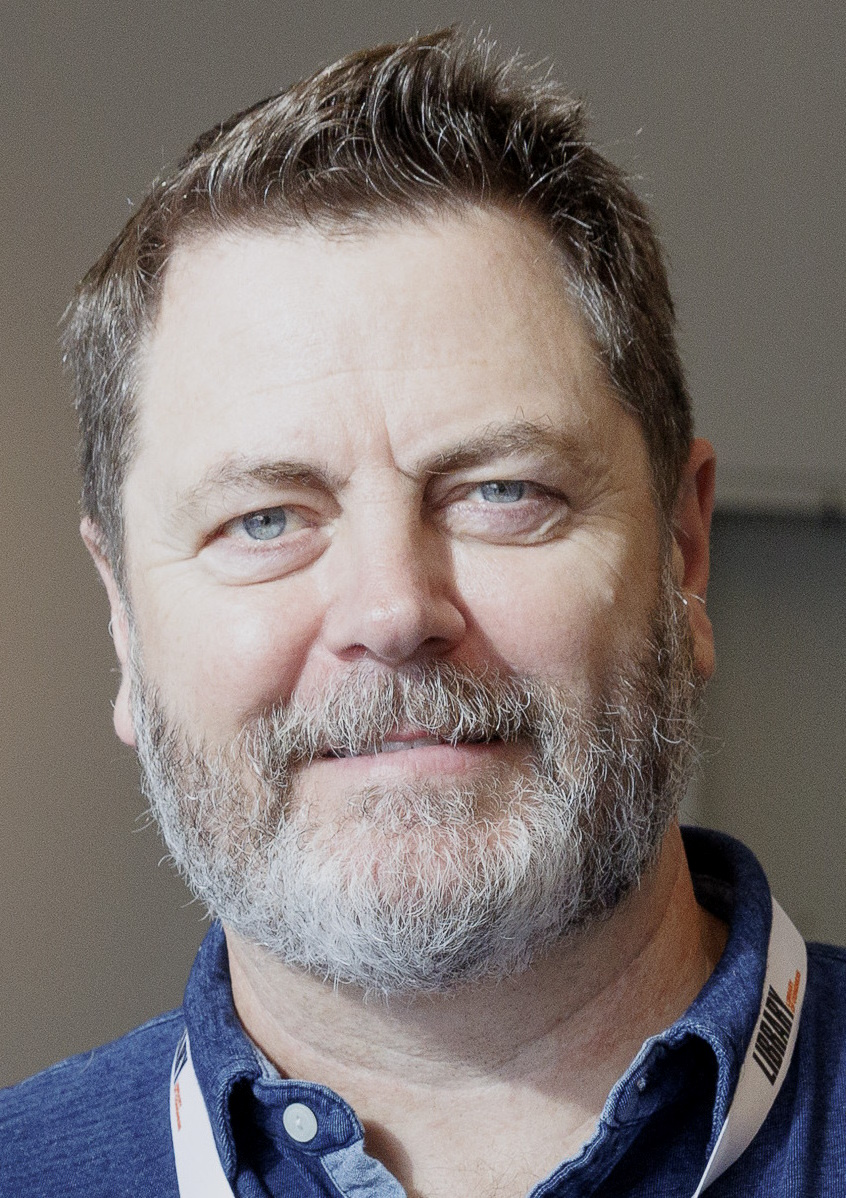
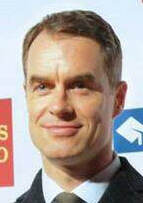
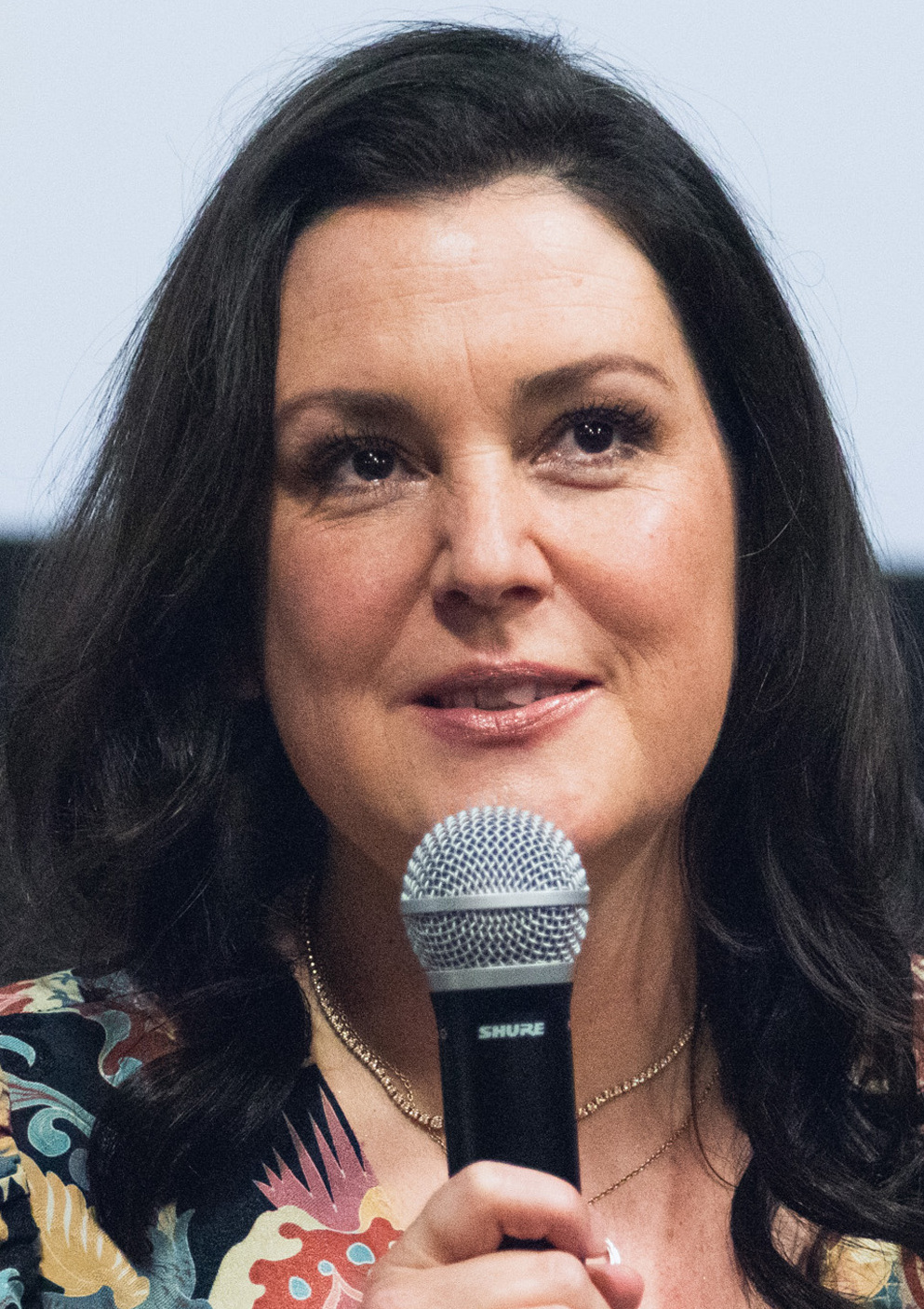
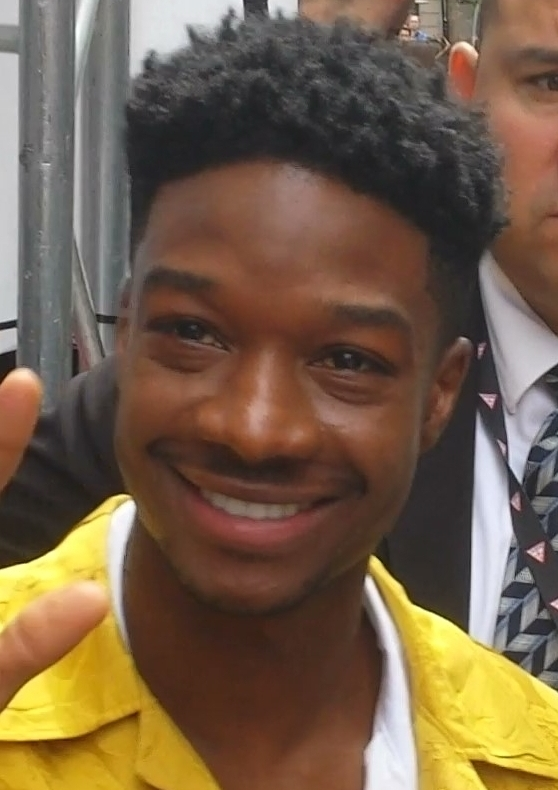
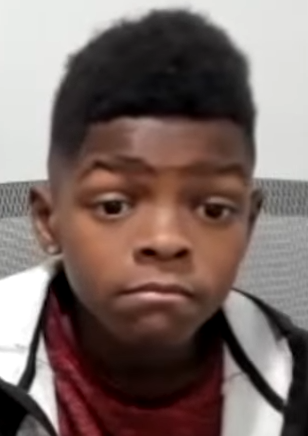
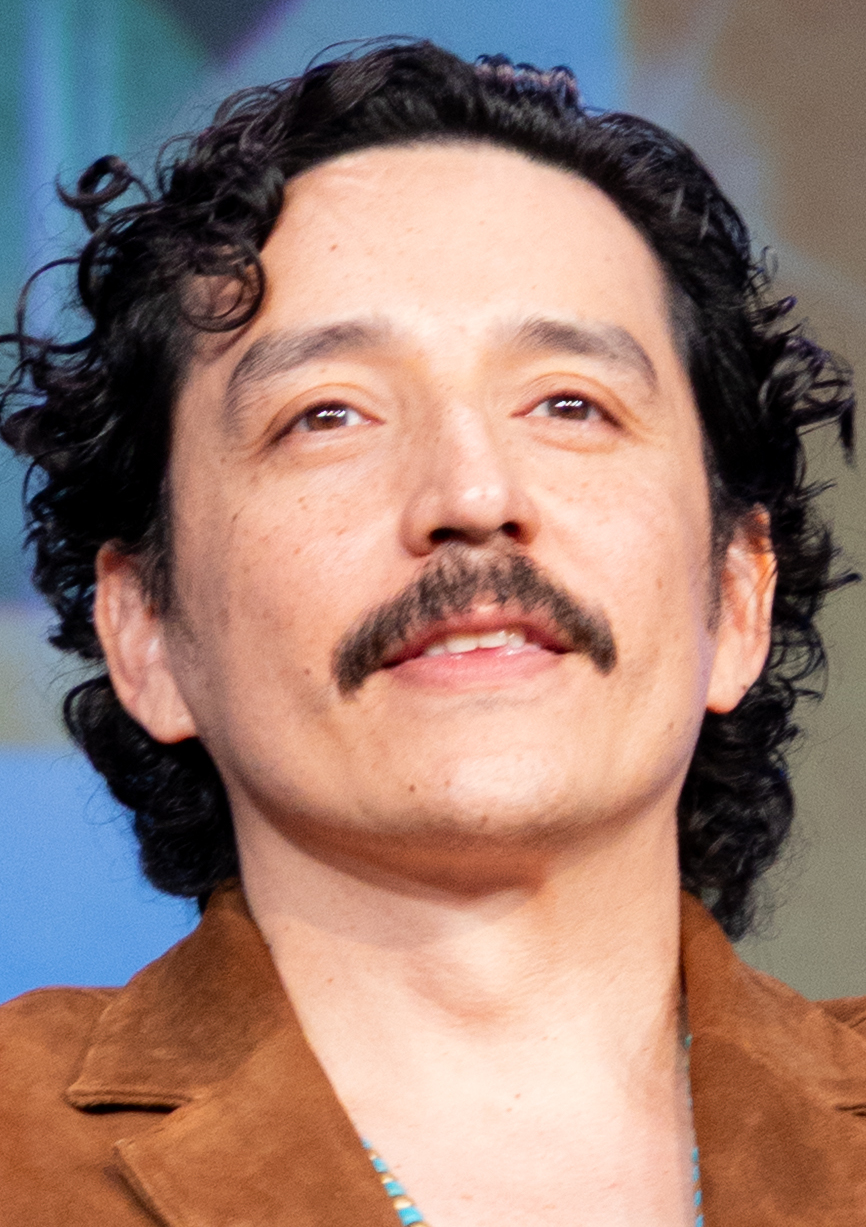
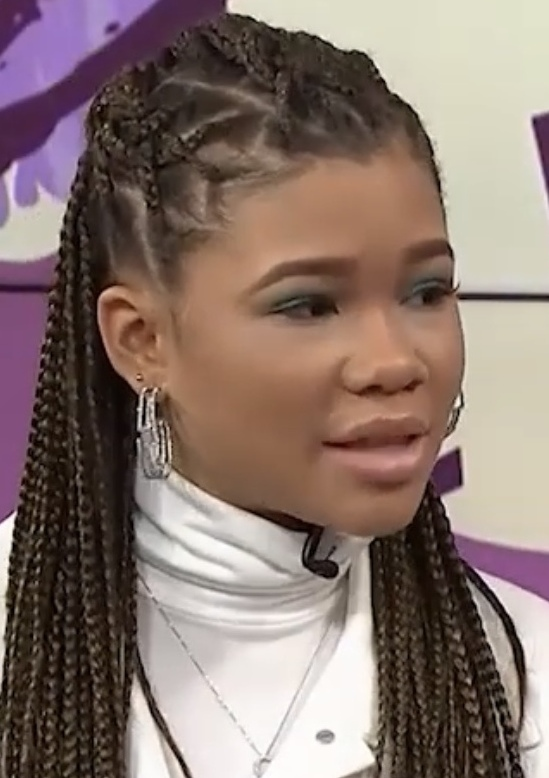
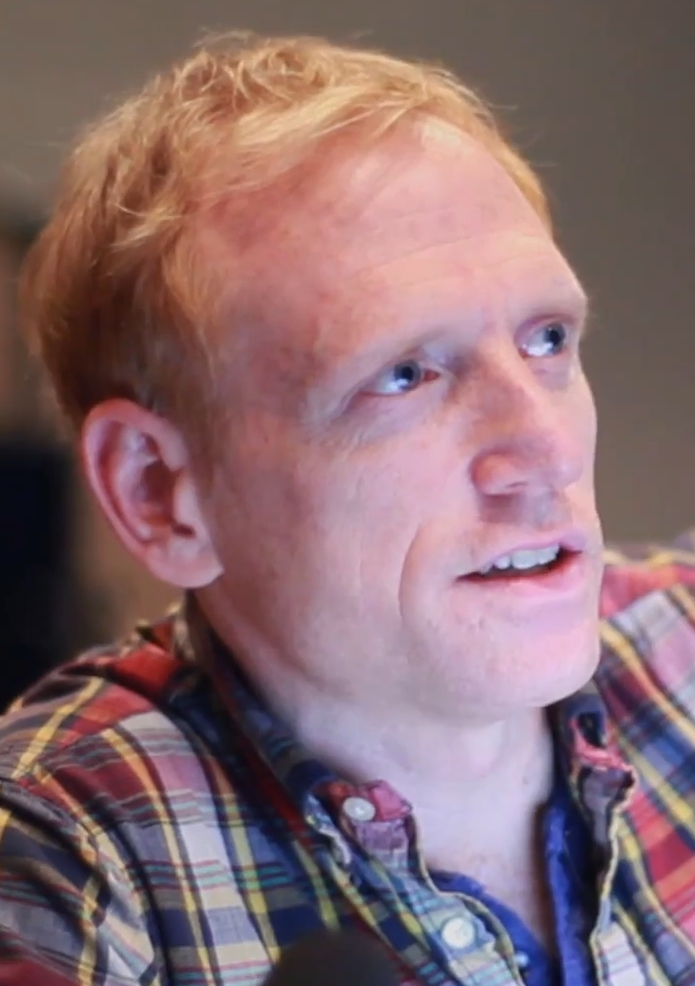
Critics widely praised the guest performances of Nico Parker, Anna Torv, Nick Offerman, Murray Bartlett, Melanie Lynskey (top), Lamar Johnson, Keivonn Montreal Woodard, Gabriel Luna, Storm Reid, and Scott Shepherd (bottom). (Note: Attributed to multiple references, per guest actor: Nico Parker; Anna Torv; Nick Offerman and Murray Bartlett; Melanie Lynskey; Lamar Johnson and Keivonn Montreal Woodard; Gabriel Luna; Storm Reid; Scott Shepherd)

The cast's performances received widespread acclaim, with critics singling out the chemistry between Pascal and Ramsey for praise. Evening Standard's Vicky Jessop said the two "steal every scene they're in", while Rolling Stone's Alan Sepinwall called them "compulsively watchable and almost instantly endearing". Empire's Nugent and /Film's Ettenhofer referred to Pascal's performance as the best of his career, citing his ability to portray nuance and rare vulnerability. TechRadar's Metz described him as the "perfect real-world manifestation" of Joel. Several critics found Ramsey gave the show's breakout performance for their balance of comedy and emotion, with Time's Judy Berman calling them "the show's greatest asset" and IGN's Cardy applauding them for "making [their] mark" on Ellie, a character already considered iconic long before Ramsey's portrayal. Some critics considered the seventh episode Ramsey's strongest.

Guest performances throughout the season were highly praised. For the premiere, Rolling Stone's Sepinwall lauded Parker for "holding the screen" and establishing Sarah as likeable, and Push Square's Aaron Bayne wrote Luna flawlessly "slips into the role" with little screen time. Den of Geek's Bernard Boo found Torv in the second episode sophisticated and heartbreaking. Offerman and Bartlett's performances were described by Complex's William Goodman as "career-best" and by Inverse's Johnston as Emmy-worthy. Lynskey's performance in the fourth and fifth episodes was praised for juxtaposing humanity and viciousness. For the fifth episode, IGN's Cardy lauded Johnson's emotional performance in his final scene, and Total Film's Bradley Russell felt the naivety of Woodard's role intensified the narrative. Critics enjoyed Pascal and Luna's chemistry in the sixth episode, and Ramsey and Reid's in the seventh; Bleeding Cool's Tom Chang called the latter two "award-worthy", and Push Square's Bayne felt Reid effectively captured Riley's sense of "youthful pride". The A.V. Club's David Cote called Shepherd's performance "masterful in its wry, understated charm".

=== Ratings ===
The premiere episode had 4.7 million viewers in the United States on its first night of availability, including linear viewers and streams on HBO Max, making it the second-largest debut for HBO since 2010, behind House of the Dragon. It was streamed for a total of 223 million minutes in its first three hours. The total viewing figure increased to over 10 million viewers after two days, 18 million after a week, 22 million within twelve days, and almost 40 million within two months. In Latin America, the series premiere was the biggest HBO Max debut ever. The second episode had 5.7 million viewers on its first night, an increase of 22% from the previous week, the largest second-week audience growth for an original HBO drama series in the network's history. From January 16 to 22, the series was streamed for 837 million minutes, ranking sixth for the week and outpacing House of the Dragon's first two episodes in the same interval; it maintained its sixth position with 877 million the following week. By January 31, the first two episodes averaged 21.3 million viewers.

The third episode had 6.4 million viewers on its first night, a 12% increase. The series was streamed for 1.19 billion minutes from January 30 to February 5, ranking fourth for the week, and 1.1 billion minutes the following week, ranking third. The fourth episode had 7.5 million viewers, a 17% weekly increase and 60% increase from the first episode. By March 6, the first five episodes averaged almost 30 million viewers across linear viewers and streams; by March 12, the first six averaged 30.4 million, the highest figure for an HBO series since the eighth season of Game of Thrones, surpassing House of the Dragon's ten-episode average. The fifth episode had 11.6 million viewers in its first weekend, while the sixth and seventh had 7.8 and 7.7 million viewers, respectively, on their first nights. The series ranked fourth for streaming with 943 million minutes from February 13 to 19, and third with 1.187 billion minutes from February 20 to 26. It was the second-most streamed series of February with 4.4 billion minutes, behind New Amsterdam.

The final two episodes had 8.1 and 8.2 million viewers on their first nights, a 74% and 75% increase from the premiere. It ranked third for streaming with 1.01 billion minutes from February 27 to March 5, fourth with 1.058 billion minutes from March 6 to 12, and sixth with 817 million minutes from March 12 to 19. With over 3 million viewers in the United Kingdom, the ninth episode became Sky's most-viewed finale for an American debut series, topping House of the Dragon's first-season finale. The series broke HBO's subscription video on demand viewer ratings in Europe, and became the most-watched show on HBO Max in Europe and Latin America. By May, the series averaged almost 32 million viewers per episode in the United States. It was HBO's most-watched debut season ever.

Viewership and ratings per episode of The Last of Us season 1
| No. | Title | Air date | Rating (18–49) | Viewers (millions) | Ref. |
|---|---|---|---|---|---|
| 1 | "When You're Lost in the Darkness" | January 15, 2023 | 0.17 | 0.588 | |
| 2 | "Infected" | January 22, 2023 | 0.19 | 0.633 | |
| 3 | "Long, Long Time" | January 29, 2023 | 0.21 | 0.747 | |
| 4 | "Please Hold to My Hand" | February 5, 2023 | 0.26 | 0.991 | |
| 5 | "Endure and Survive" | February 12, 2023 | 0.09 | 0.382 | |
| 6 | "Kin" | February 19, 2023 | 0.28 | 0.841 | |
| 7 | "Left Behind" | February 26, 2023 | 0.37 | 1.083 | |
| 8 | "When We Are in Need" | March 5, 2023 | 0.30 | 1.039 | |
| 9 | "Look for the Light" | March 12, 2023 | 0.33 | 1.040 | |

=== Commercial impact ===
Sales for the video games increased following the premiere by approximately 38%, and by 75% by the finale. In January, Part I was the eighth-most-downloaded PlayStation 5 game in North America and tenth in Europe; on PlayStation 4, Part II was seventh in both, while The Last of Us Remastered was thirteenth in North America and fifteenth in Europe. In February, Part II rose to first, Part I to sixth in North America and seventh in Europe, and Remastered to ninth and seventh, respectively. In the United Kingdom, in the week after the premiere, digital sales for Remastered increased by 337% over the previous week and Part I by 305%, (Note: In physical sales, Part I increased by 238% and Remastered by 322%, ranking 20th and 32nd, respectively.) reentering the charts at 11th and 16th. The following week, Part I saw another 32% increase at retail, and Remastered 27%. For the month, Part II sales increased 317% and Remastered 285%. In the United States, Part I reentered the January charts at 11th, climbing 25 positions. Total monthly active users increased in January: Remastered to 1.8 million (a more than 1,000% increase), Part II to 1.4 million (440%), and Part I to almost 600,000 (347%); this continued into February for Remastered with 2.2 million players (an additional 417%) and Part II with almost 1.6 million (178%), and remained above its pre-premiere count until mid-year.

=== Awards and nominations ===
The Last of Us is the first live-action video game adaptation to receive major awards consideration. It was nominated for 24 Primetime Emmy Awards, with a leading eight wins at the Creative Arts Emmy Awards, including for Offerman and Reid. From major guilds, it won two awards at the Screen Actors Guild Awards and one at the Directors Guild of America Awards, and received two nominations at the Producers Guild of America Awards and Writers Guild of America Awards. It was nominated for three Critics' Choice Television Awards, three Golden Globe Awards, and five TCA Awards, and led the Astra Creative Arts TV Awards with six nominations and the Visual Effects Society Awards's television categories with six nominations and four wins. In genre awards, the series was nominated for five Saturn Awards. It led the MTV Movie & TV Awards with three wins, including Best Show, and was nominated for six awards at the People's Choice Awards, including Show of the Year. The series earned the biannual Seal of Authentic Representation from the Ruderman Family Foundation for Woodard's role as Sam, and was named among the Top 10 Television Programs at the American Film Institute Awards.
