= Barrier Lake =

Barrier Lake may refer to:

- Barrier Lake (Alberta), a lake in Alberta, Canada
- Barrier Lake (British Columbia), a lake in British Columbia, Canada
- Barrier Lake (Saskatchewan), a lake in Saskatchewan, Canada

== See also ==
- Landslide dam; a body of water formed behind such a dam is called a barrier lake
