= Barrier (surname) =

Barrier is the surname of the following people:

- Adrien Barrier (1891–?), French wrestler
- Edgar Barrier (1907–1964), American actor
- Ella D. Barrier (1852–1945), American educator
- Eric B. (Louis Eric Barrier, born 1963), American hip hop musician
- Ernestine Barrier (1908–1989), American actress, wife of Edgar
- Fannie Barrier Williams (1855–1944), American educator and political and women's rights activist
- James Barrier (1953–2008), American wrestling promoter
- Jim Barrier (1940–2000), American alpine skier
- Maurice Barrier (1932–2020), French actor and singer
- Michael Barrier (born 1940), American animation historian
- Robert Barrier (1907–1955), French politician
- Smith Barrier (1961–1989), American sports journalist
- Sylvain Barrier (born 1988), French motorcycle racer
