= List of most expensive television series =

This is a list of most expensive television series.

== Cost per episode ==
=== Over US $20 million ===
Title	Year(s)	Est. costs (million US$)		Ref.
Title	Year(s)	Unadjusted	2025 inflation	Ref.
Stranger Things 5	2025	60	60	
The Lord of the Rings: The Rings of Power (season 1)	2022	58	64	
The Lord of the Rings: The Rings of Power (season 2)	2024	57.275	59	
Citadel	2023	50	53	
Secret Invasion	2023	35.3	37	
Stranger Things (season 4)	2022	30	33	
Loki (season 2)	2023	29.5	31	
WandaVision	2021	25	30	
The Falcon and the Winter Soldier	2021	25	30	
Loki (season 1)	2021	25	30	
Hawkeye	2021	25	30	
Ms. Marvel	2022	25	28	
She-Hulk: Attorney at Law	2022	25	28	
Andor (season 2)	2025	24.2	24.2	
Moon Knight	2022	24	27	
The Acolyte	2024	22.5	30	
1923	2022–2025	22	24	
Andor (season 1)	2022	20	23	
The Pacific	2010	20	30	
House of the Dragon	2022–2024	20	22	
3 Body Problem	2024	20	21	
Severance (season 2)	2025	20	20	

=== Over US $10 million ===
Title	Year(s)	Est. costs (million US$)		Ref.
Title	Year(s)	Unadjusted	2025 inflation	Ref.
One Piece (season 1)	2023	17.27–18	19	
The Wheel of Time (season 1 and 2)	2021–2023	16.2	17	
The Mandalorian	2019–2023	15	19	
See	2019–2022	15	19	
Game of Thrones (season 8)	2019	15	19	
The Book of Boba Fett	2021	15	18	
Obi-Wan Kenobi	2022	15	17	
The Sandman (season 1)	2022	15	17	
Ahsoka (season 1)	2023	15	16	
Avatar: The Last Airbender (season 1)	2024	15	15	
The Crown (season 6)	2023	14.4	15	
The Crown (season 5)	2022	14.3	16	
Arcane	2021–2024	13.8	15	
Percy Jackson and the Olympians (season 1)	2023	13.5	14	
ER (seasons 6 and 7)	1999–2001	13	30	
Pachinko (season 1)	2022	13	14	
Band of Brothers	2001	12.5	23	
The Boys	2019–2024	11	11	
The Crown (season 4)	2020	10.9	14	
Game of Thrones (season 6)	2016	10	13	
Game of Thrones (season 7)	2017	10	13	
The Crown (season 3)	2019	10	13	
His Dark Materials	2019–2022	10	13	
The Witcher	2019–2023	10	13	
Stranger Things (season 3)	2019	10	13	
The Last of Us (season 1)	2023	10	11	
Halo	2022–2024	10	10	

=== Over US$1 million ===
Title	Year(s)	Est. costs (million US$)		Ref.
Title	Year(s)	Unadjusted	2025 inflation	Ref.
Sense8	2015–2018	9	12	
Doctor Who (2023 specials, series 14 and 15)	2023–2025	8.5–11.3	9–12	
The Crown (season 2)	2017	8.2	11	
Stranger Things (season 2)	2017	8	11	
Ted (season 1)	2024	8	8	
The Crown (season 1)	2016	7	9	
Watership Down	2018	6.7	9	
Game of Thrones (season 2)	2012	6	8	
Stranger Things (season 1)	2016	6	8	
Tulsa King (season 2)	2024	6	6	
The Night Manager (season 1)	2016	5	7	
Boardwalk Empire (season 1)	2010	5	7	
House of Cards (season 1)	2013	4.5	6	
House of Cards (seasons 2 and 3)	2014–2015	4.23	6	
Nashville	2012–2018	4.1	8	
Hemlock Grove (season 1)	2013	4	6	
Orange Is the New Black (season 1)	2013	4	6	
Seinfeld (season 9)	1997–1998	9	18	
Terminator: The Sarah Connor Chronicles (season 1)	2008–2009	2.65	4	
Now and Again	1999–2000	2.4	4	
Cheers (season 10)	1991–1992	2.2	5	
Nash Bridges (seasons 3 to 6)	1996–2001	2	4	
Miami Vice (season 2)	1985–1986	2	6	
Stargate SG-1 (season 10)	2006–2007	2	3	
Stargate SG-1 (season 8)	2004–2005	1.7	3	
Walking with Dinosaurs	1999	1.6	3	
The Flash	1990–1991	1.6	4	
The Young Indiana Jones Chronicles (season 1)	1992	1.5	3	
Star Trek: Deep Space Nine (season 1)	1993	1.5	3	
The Untouchables (season 1)	1993	1.5	3	
Stargate Atlantis (season 1)	2004–2005	1.5	3	
The Simpsons (season 7)	1995–1996	1.5	3	
Stargate SG-1 (season 1)	1997–1998	1.3	2	
Dallas	1978–1991	1.2	3	
Dynasty (season 9)	1988–1989	1.2	3	
Falcon Crest (season 6)	1986–1987	1	3	
Farscape	1999–2003	1	2	
Afro Samurai	2007	1	2	
Da Vinci's Inquest (season 4)	2001–2002	1	2	
Space: Above and Beyond	1995–1996	1	2	

== Total cost ==
Title	Year(s)	Est. costs (million US$)		Network	Ref.
Title	Year(s)	Unadjusted	2025 inflation	Network	Ref.
The Lord of the Rings: The Rings of Power	2022–present	1,000	1,057	Amazon Prime Video	
Stranger Things	2016–2025	870–950	968–1,050	Netflix	
Andor	2022–2025	650	650	Disney+	
The Crown	2016–2023	648	685	Netflix	
Game of Thrones	2011–2019	630	793	HBO	
Westworld	2016–2022	455	501	HBO	
See	2019–2022	360	453	Apple TV+	
The Mandalorian	2019–2023	360	453	Disney+	
House of the Dragon	2022–present	360	396	HBO	
The Boys	2019–2024	352	361	Amazon Prime Video	
Chief of War	2025–present	340	340	Apple TV+	
The Sopranos	1999–2007	301	467	HBO	
Citadel	2023–present	300	317	Amazon Prime Video	
The Wheel of Time (seasons 1 and 2)	2021–2023	261	276	Amazon Prime Video	
The Morning Show (season 1)	2019	250	315	Apple TV+	
Shōgun (season 1)	2024	250	257	FX	
Masters of the Air	2024	250	257	Apple TV+	
Alien: Earth	2025–present	250	250	FX	
Arcane	2021–2024	248	262	Netflix	
The Witcher	2019–2023	240	302	Netflix	
His Dark Materials	2019–2022	230	290	BBC One, HBO	
The Acolyte	2024	230	236	Disney+	
WandaVision	2021	225	267	Disney+	
She-Hulk: Attorney at Law	2022	225	248	Disney+	
Rome	2005–2007	225	349	HBO	
Sense8	2015–2018	216	277	Netflix	
Secret Invasion	2023	212	224	Disney+	
1923 (season 1)	2022	200	220	Paramount+	
The Pacific	2010	200	295	HBO	
Marco Polo	2014–2016	200	268	Netflix	
Doctor Who (2023 specials, series 14 and 15)	2023–2025	178.5–238	189–251	BBC One, Disney+	
Halo	2022–2024	170	174	Paramount+	
Bridgerton	2020–2024	168	172	Netflix	
Euphoria (season 1)	2019	88	111	HBO	
The Sandman	2022	165	182	Netflix	
Deadwood	2004–2006	162	259	HBO	
3 Body Problem	2024	160	164	Netflix	
Fallout (season 1)	2024	153	162	Amazon Prime Video	
1923 (season 2)	2025	150	165	Paramount+	
The Falcon and the Winter Soldier	2021	150	178	Disney+	
Hawkeye	2021	150	178	Disney+	
Ms. Marvel	2022	150	165	Disney+	
Moon Knight	2022	147	162	Disney+	
One Piece	2023	144	152	Netflix	
Those About to Die	2024–present	140	144	Peacock, Amazon Prime Video	
Band of Brothers	2001	125	227	HBO	
The Get Down	2016	120	161	Netflix	
Ahsoka	2023	120	127	Disney+	
Avatar: The Last Airbender	2024	120	123	Netflix	
Percy Jackson and the Olympians	2023	108	114	Disney+	
The Book of Boba Fett	2021	105	125	Disney+	
Pachinko (season 1)	2022	104	114	Apple TV+	
The Last of Us (season 1)	2023	100	106	HBO	
Beast Games	2024–2025	100	103	Amazon Prime Video	
Succession (seasons 1–2)	2018–2019	90	113	HBO	
Obi-Wan Kenobi	2022	90	99	Disney+	
Rise of the Raven (season 1)	2025	70	70	TV2	
Y: Marshals	2026	52	52	CBS	
The Young Indiana Jones Chronicles	1992–1996	27	62	ABC	
Watership Down	2018	27	35	BBC One, Netflix	
Amazon	1999–2000	26	50	Syndication	
Tiny Toon Adventures (season 1)	1990–1991	25	59	CBS	
BraveStarr	1987–1988	20	59	Syndication	
Water Rats (season 1)	1996–2001	16	33	Nine Network	
ThunderCats (season 1)	1985	15	45	Syndication	
The Puzzle Place (season 1)	1995	10.3	22	PBS Kids	
Walking with Dinosaurs	1999	9.9	19	BBC One	
Atomic Betty (season 1)	2004–2005	9	15	Teletoon, M6	
Cosmos: A Personal Voyage	1980–1981	8.2	29	PBS	
WMAC Masters (season 1)	1995–1997	5.5	12	Syndication	
Van-Pires	1997	5.2	10	Syndication	
Cubix	2001–2004	4.5	8	SBS	

== See also ==
- List of most expensive films
