= Barrier reef (disambiguation) =

A barrier reef is a type of coral reef formed offshore. It may also refer to:

Specific barrier reefs, including the

- Belize Barrier Reef, straddling the coast of Belize, within the Mesoamerican Barrier Reef System
- Great Barrier Reef, in Australia, the world's largest coral reef system
- Mesoamerican Barrier Reef System, which covers over 1000 km from Isla Contoy at Yucatán Peninsula to Belize, Guatemala, and the Bay Islands of Honduras
- New Caledonian barrier reef, in the South Pacific

Television series

- Barrier Reef (TV series), an Australian television series
