= Great Barrier =

Great Barrier may refer to:

== Places ==
- Great Barrier Island, in the north of New Zealand
- Great Barrier Reef, in the Coral Sea off the coast of Queensland in north-east Australia
- Gilf Kebir, Arabic for "the Great Barrier," a plateau in the New Valley Governorate of the remote southwest corner of Egypt
- Great Ice Barrier, a later 19th–early 20th century name for the Ross Ice Shelf, Antarctica

== In fiction ==
- The Great Barrier (film), a 1937 British film
- "The Great Barrier" (Star Trek)
- The fourth episode of Law & Order: Criminal Intent (season 4)

== See also ==
- Barrier (disambiguation)
