= The Great Barrier Reef: Biology, Environment and Management =

Book by Pat Hutchings, Mike Kingsford and Ove Hoegh-Guldberg

- Author: Pat Hutchings, Mike Kingsford, Ove Hoegh-Guldberg
- Publication date: 2007
- ISBN: 9780643099975

The Great Barrier Reef: Biology, Environment and Management is a 2008 book by Pat Hutchings, Mike Kingsford and Ove Hoegh-Guldberg. It describes the organisms and ecosystems of Australia's Great Barrier Reef, and the biological, chemical and physical processes that influence them. Issues discussed include climate change, coral bleaching, coral disease and coral reef fishing. The book includes a field guide to help people identify the common animals and plants on the reef. The book has illustrations and contributions from 33 international experts.

Pat Hutchings is a senior principal research scientist at the Australian Museum. Michael Kingsford is the head of school of Marine Biology and Aquaculture at James Cook University. Ove Hoegh-Guldberg is the director of the Centre for Marine Studies at the University of Queensland.
