= Robert Barrier =

French politician

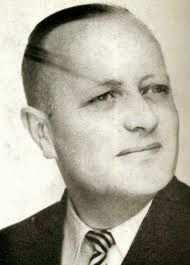
Robert Barrier

Robert Barrier (21 December 1907, Bellegarde-sur-Valserine - 7 December 1955) was a French politician. He represented the Democratic and Socialist Union of the Resistance (UDSR) in the National Assembly from 1951 to 1955.
