= Mount Baldy (Alberta) =

Mountain in Alberta, Canada

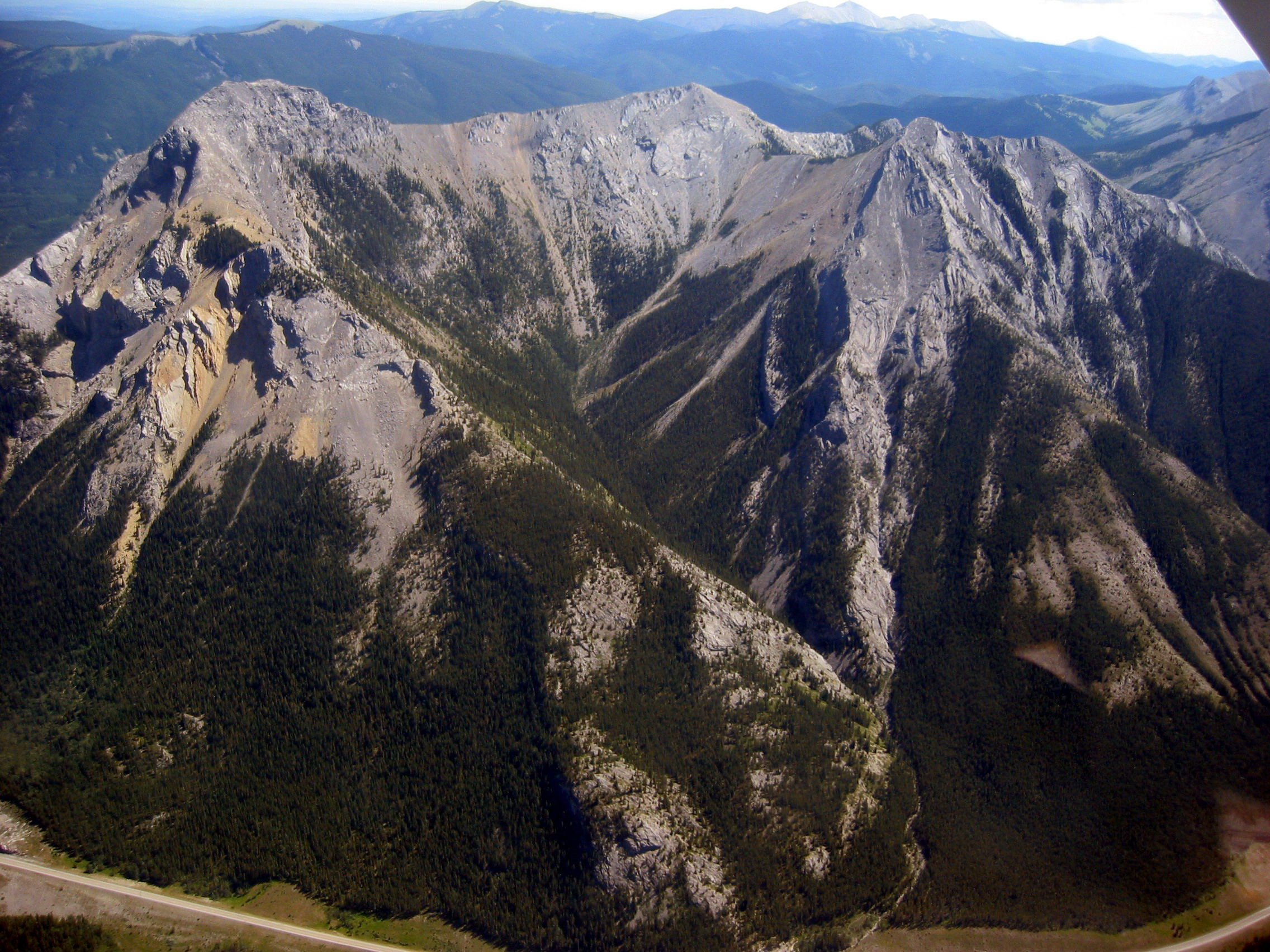
- Mount Baldy from over Barrier Lake

Highest point
- Elevation: 2,192 m (7,192 ft)
- Prominence: 348 m (1,142 ft)
- Listing: Mountains of Alberta
- Coordinates: 51°00′42″N 115°02′57″W

Geography
- Location within Alberta
- Country: Canada
- Province: Alberta
- Parent range: Fisher Range
- Topo map: NTS 82O3 Canmore

Climbing
- Easiest route: Easy scramble to North peak, moderate to others.

Mount Baldy is a mountain located in the Kananaskis River valley alongside Highway 40 in the Canadian Rockies.

During World War II, prisoners in a nearby internment camp were occasionally permitted to make the ascent of Mt. Baldy as long as they promised to return. A University of Calgary research centre now occupies the former location of the camp.

Up until 1984, when it was given its current day official name, it was commonly referred to as Barrier Mountain, due to its proximity to Barrier Lake.

== Gallery ==
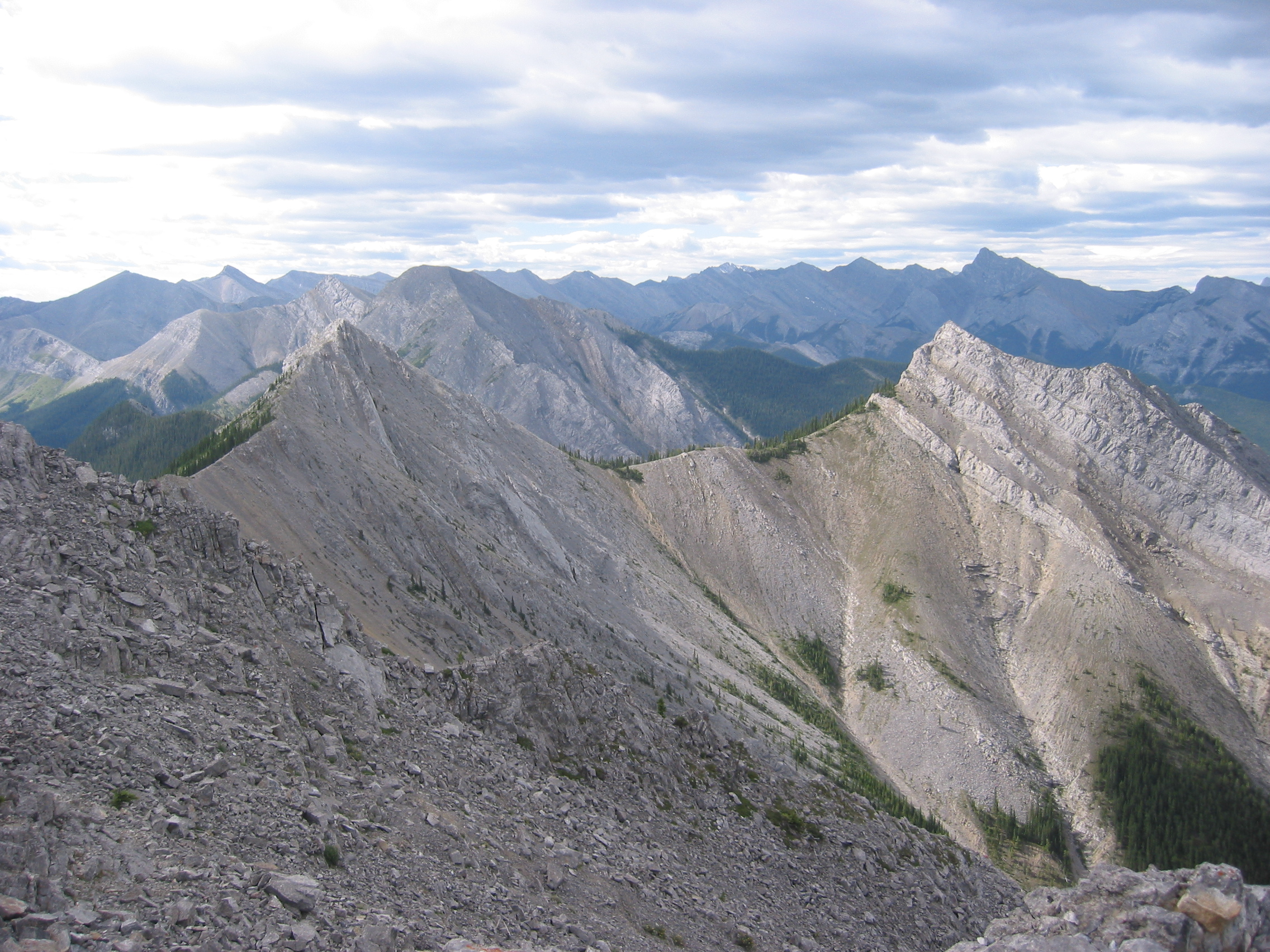
South and west peaks from the summit of the north peak

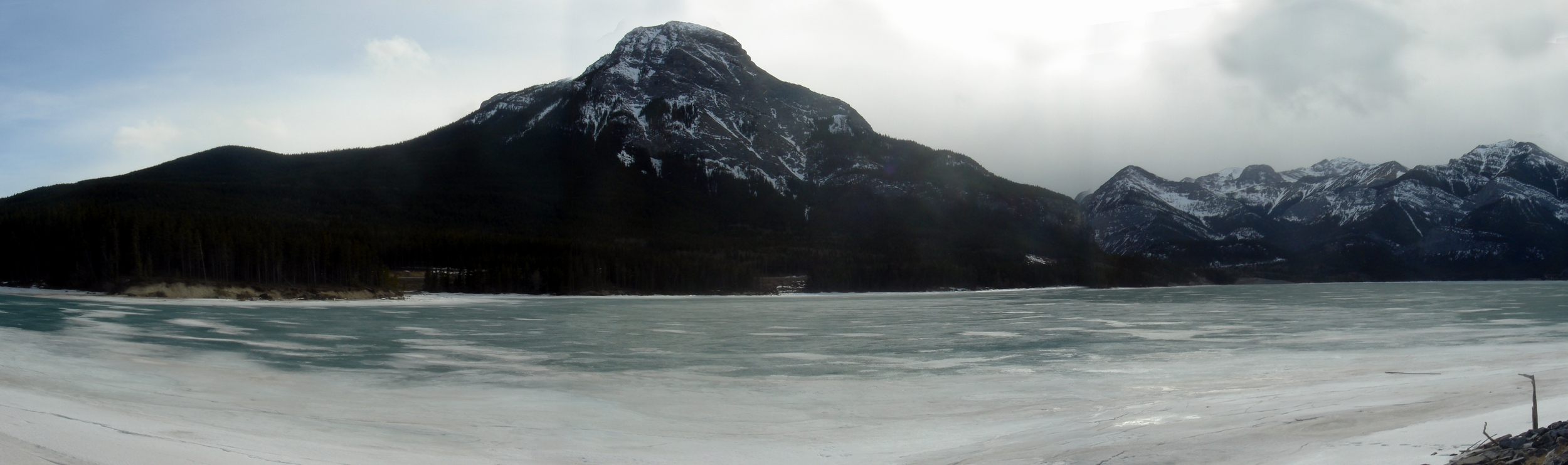
View from Barrier Lake

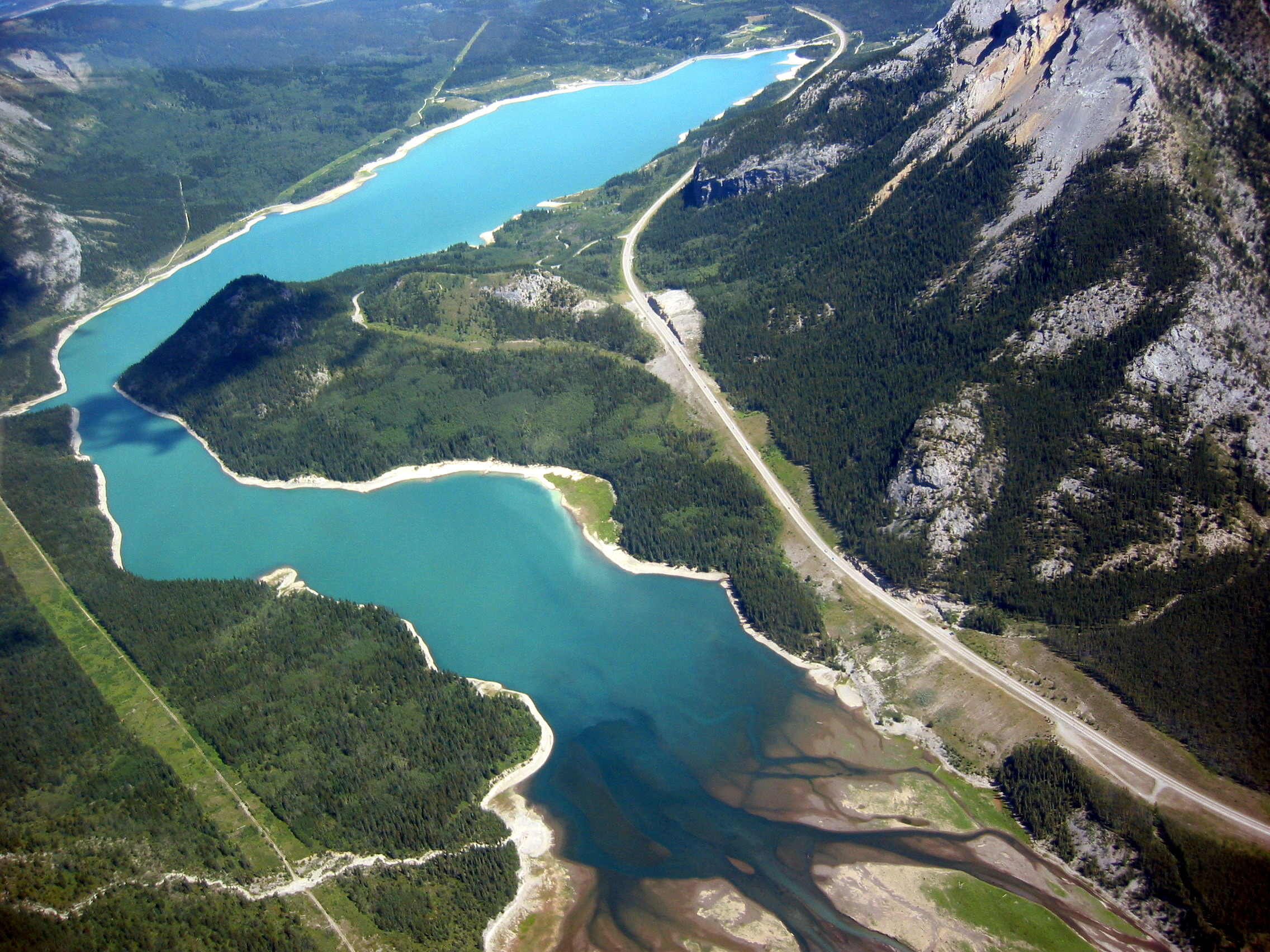
Towering over Barrier Lake
