= Barrier Lake (Alberta) =

Reservoir in Alberta, Canada

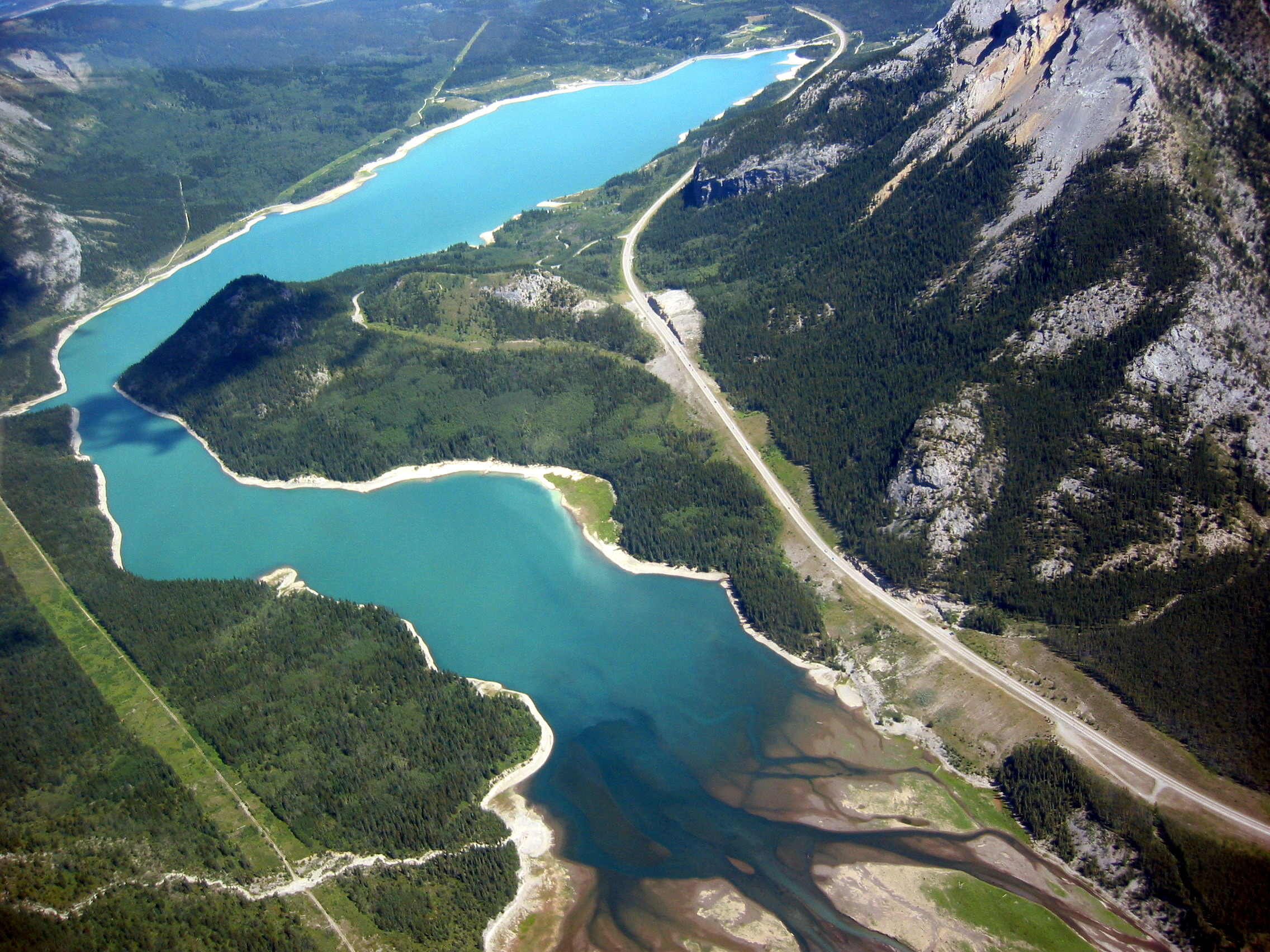
- Lake, Hwy 40 and Mount Baldy

- Location within Alberta Location within Canada
- Location: Kananaskis, Alberta
- Coordinates: 51°01′38″N 115°03′56″W
- Type: reservoir
- Primary inflows: Kananaskis River
- Primary outflows: Kananaskis River
- Basin countries: Canada

Barrier Lake is a man-made reservoir at the north end of Kananaskis Country in Alberta, Canada.

Highway 40 runs between the lake and Mount Baldy, on the eastern shore. It is entirely located in the Bow Valley Provincial Park.

Barrier Lake was created by the former Calgary Power Company, now TransAlta, in 1947, for hydroelectric power generation on the Kananaskis River. The dam that impounds the lake is at the north end of the lake.

The lake is also used for recreational activities, with hiking paths surrounding the lake (and cross-country skiing trails in the winter). A visitor centre is located on the eastern shore. Two day-use areas, Barrier Dam and Barrier Lake, are maintained by Alberta Parks. The Jewell Bay Backcountry Campground is established 4 kilometres (2 mi) from the dam. Water-skiing is permitted on the lake, but is rarely done due to the low temperatures of the water.

Barrier Lake was used in the 2003 film X2: X-Men United as the stand in for Alkali Lake and in Heartland (CBC) as Eagle Lake (2011).

== See also ==
- List of lakes of Alberta
