= The Prize =

The Prize may refer to:

- The Prize (novel), a 1962 novel by Irving Wallace
  - The Prize (1963 film), a 1963 film based on the novel
- The Prize (1950 film), a 1950 French film
- The Prize (2011 film), a 2011 Mexican film
- The Prize (2023 film), a 2023 Indonesian film
- "The Prize" (Young Hercules), a 1998 episode of the TV series
- The Prize: The Epic Quest for Oil, Money, and Power, a 1990 book by Daniel Yergin
- "The Prize", a song on Guster's album Parachute (album)
- The Prize (album), 2025 album by Prima Queen
- The Prize, a 1977 album by the Alwyn Wall Band; see Malcolm and Alwyn
- The Prize, a 2012 album by Jakwob

== See also ==
- Eyes on the Prize, a documentary about the American civil rights movement
- Prize (disambiguation)
- The Price (disambiguation)
