= Price (disambiguation) =

The price is the assigned or determined value of a good, service, or asset.

Price may also refer to:

== Places ==
- Price Hill (disambiguation)
- Mount Price (disambiguation)

=== United States ===
- Price, Maryland, an unincorporated community
- Price, Texas, an unincorporated community
- Price, Utah, a city
- Price River, Utah
- Price, West Virginia, an unincorporated community
- Price County, Wisconsin
- Price, Wisconsin, a town
- Price, Jackson County, Wisconsin, an unincorporated community
- Price Glacier (Mount Shuksan), North Cascades National Park, Washington
- Price Freeway, a piece of Loop 101 in Metropolitan Phoenix

=== Elsewhere ===
- Price, South Australia, Australia, a town and locality
- Price, Quebec, Canada, a village municipality
- Price Town, Wales, a village
- Price Peak, Marie Byrd Land, Antarctica
- Price Glacier (Antarctica)
- Price Island, British Columbia, Canada
- Main Operating Base Price, Helmand Province, Afghanistan, an International Security Assistance Force base

=== United States and Canada ===
- Price Township (disambiguation)
- Mount Price (disambiguation)

== People ==
- Price (surname)
- Price (given name)
- W. Price Hunt (1783–1842), an early pioneer of the Pacific Northwest of North America

== Buildings ==
- Price Tower, a building in Bartlesville, Oklahoma
- Édifice Price (Price Building), a skyscraper in Quebec City, Canada
- Price Center, University of California, San Diego, California, a student center
- Price's Mill, South Carolina, a gristmill on the National Register of Historic Places
- Price's Post Office, South Carolina, on the National Register of Historic Places

== Businesses ==
- PRICE Systems, a business within the RCA Corporation
- Price's Candles, a UK manufacturer and retailer of candles founded in 1830
- Mr. Price, South African Retail Store

== Other uses ==
- Price baronets, six titles, two being extant
- One of two variations of RICE (medicine), an acronym for a treatment method for soft tissue injuries:
  - Protection, Rest, Ice, Compression and Elevation, or
  - Pulse (Typically Radial or Distal), Rest, Ice, Compression, and Elevation

== See also ==
- The Price (disambiguation)
- Prize (disambiguation)
- Justice Price (disambiguation)
