= The Price =

The Price may refer to:

== Television episodes ==
- "The Price" (Angel), 2002
- "The Price" (Hemlock Grove), 2013
- "The Price" (M*A*S*H), 1979
- "The Price" (Once Upon a Time), 2015
- "The Price" (Prison Break), 2008
- "The Price" (Star Trek: The Next Generation), 1989
- "The Price" (The Last of Us), 2025

== Film ==
- The Price (1915 film), an American silent drama
- The Price (1924 film), an Australian lost silent film
- The Price (1971 film), a TV adaptation of Arthur Miller's play
- The Price (2017 film), an American drama

== Other ==
- The Price (play), by Arthur Miller
- The Price (graphic novel), by Jim Starlin
- "The Price", a short story by Neil Gaiman, originally published in his book Smoke and Mirrors
- "The Price" (song), by Twisted Sister
- The Price, a song by the Lightning Seeds from Cloudcuckooland

== See also ==
- Price (disambiguation)
- The Price Is Right (disambiguation)
- The Prize (disambiguation)
