= Prize (disambiguation) =

A prize is an award received for merit

Prize may also refer to:

== Media ==
- The Prize (novel), a 1962 novel by Irving Wallace
- The Prize (1963 film), a 1963 film based on the novel
- The Prize (2011 film), a 2011 film
- The Prize: The Epic Quest for Oil, Money, and Power, a 1991 book by Daniel Yergin

== Other uses ==
- Prize (law), captured or recovered vessel
- Prize (marketing), promotional item (usually a toy or other small object of nominal value) included free in a retail product
- Prize, California, a former settlement
- Prize money, paid to naval personnel for the successful capture of a ship
- HMS Prize, a UK Royal Navy ship

== See also ==
- Price (disambiguation)
- Award (disambiguation)
