= Price Hill =

Price Hill may refer to:

- Price Hill, Cincinnati, a neighborhood in Cincinnati, Ohio. It includes:
  - The Lower Price Hill Historic District (Cincinnati, Ohio)
- Price Hill, West Virginia (disambiguation), several places in West Virginia
- # 3575 Price Hill, a historic railroad passenger car, rebuilt for use on the B&O Cincinnatian trainset.

== See also ==
- Price (disambiguation)
- Mount Price (disambiguation)
