= Neil Druckmann =

American video game designer (born 1978)

- ניל דרוקמן
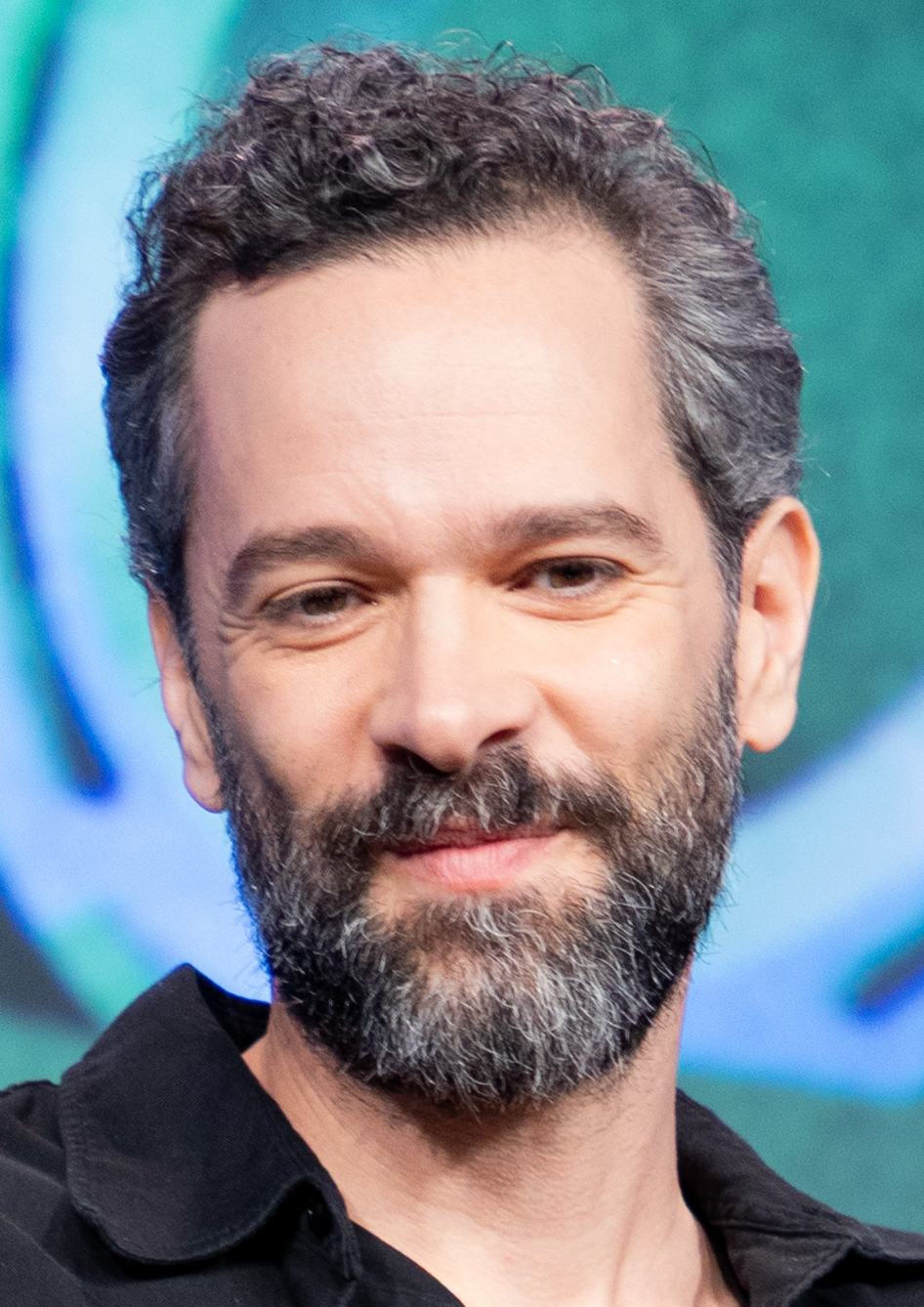
- Druckmann at SXSW in 2025
- Born: December 5, 1978 (age 47); Tel Aviv, Israel
- Education: Carnegie Mellon University
- Occupations: Writer; creative director; designer; programmer
- Years active: 2004–present
- Employer: Naughty Dog
- Notable work: Uncharted; The Last of Us
- Title: Studio head; head of creative

Neil Druckmann (Hebrew: ניל דרוקמן; born December 5, 1978) is an Israeli–American writer, creative director, designer, and programmer. He is the studio head and head of creative of the video game developer Naughty Dog, and is best known for his work on the game franchises Uncharted and The Last of Us, having co-created the latter as well as its television adaptation.

Druckmann's first video game work came as an intern at Naughty Dog. In 2004, he became a programmer on Jak 3 (2004) and Jak X: Combat Racing (2005), before becoming a designer for Uncharted: Drake's Fortune (2007). He was co-lead game designer for Uncharted 2: Among Thieves (2009), which he co-wrote with Amy Hennig and Josh Scherr; the narrative was praised and received several accolades. He has also written comics, including the motion comic Uncharted: Eye of Indra (2009) and the graphic novels A Second Chance at Sarah (2010) and The Last of Us: American Dreams (2013).

Druckmann co-led the development of The Last of Us (2013) and Uncharted 4: A Thief's End (2016) as writer and creative director, co-writing the latter with Scherr. He was promoted to vice president of Naughty Dog in 2018 while directing The Last of Us Part II (2020), co-written with Halley Gross. He became co-president in 2020, head of creative in 2023, and studio head in 2024. Druckmann co-created and wrote the television adaptation of The Last of Us with Craig Mazin and directed several episodes. He is the director of the upcoming game Intergalactic: The Heretic Prophet and co-writer with Claire Carré.

He earned praise for his writing and directing work on The Last of Us, Uncharted 4, and The Last of Us Part II, which are often regarded among the best-written and greatest video games ever made. Druckmann has received several awards, including three British Academy Games Awards, four D.I.C.E. Awards, two Game Awards, three Game Developers Choice Awards, and four Writers Guild of America Awards.

== Early life ==
Neil Druckmann was born in Tel Aviv, Israel, on December 5, 1978, into a Jewish family, the son of Yehudit (Judith) and Jerry Ilan Druckmann. Druckmann's family lived in Ramat Aviv until 1981, when they moved to Beit Aryeh, a settlement in the West Bank which largely consisted of employees of Israel Aerospace Industries, including Druckmann's father, a flight test engineer. His grandparents lived in Haifa and Tel Aviv. Druckmann recalled violence was a frequent topic on the news and in conversations at home. As an escape, his older brother Emanuel introduced him to comic books, video games, and movies at a young age, such as Pong. These forms of entertainment, particularly video games by Sierra Entertainment and LucasArts, helped him learn English. He became interested in storytelling and wrote his own comic books.

Druckmann moved to the United States with his family in 1989, attending middle school and high school in Miami, Florida. He began to study a criminology major at Florida State University (FSU), aiming to get experience as an FBI agent to use when writing thriller novels. His brother snuck him into E3 in the late 1990s, and he attended the conference again in 1998, 2000, and 2002, as well as SIGGRAPH in 2002 and 2003. As an FSU student in 2001, he won a Conker's Bad Fur Day multiplayer competition organized by Nintendo and Playboy. While studying, he worked as a clerk at My Favorite Muffin and a salesman at PacSun. From July 2002, while living in Tallahassee, Druckmann spent a year as a graphics research assistant at FSU's Visualization Lab. During this time, he and some friends began developing the game Pink-Bullet for Linux and Windows. At one point, he wanted to be an animator, which required enlisting in art classes, but his parents forbade him from doing so.

Druckmann realized programming was his preference after taking a class, and he began a Bachelor of Computer Science with a minor in math in December 2002, graduating cum laude the following year with a grade point average of 3.61. Due to his academic results, he was a member of the Golden Key Honor Society. He moved to Pittsburgh, where he attended Carnegie Mellon University, and began his master's degree in entertainment technology in August 2003 at the Entertainment Technology Center. He took a game design class by Jesse Schell, which taught him philosophies about positive impacts of games he would later use, and a virtual worlds course by Randy Pausch, which taught him to become more collaborative. Druckmann worked as a visual effects artist for a friend's team around this time. In April 2004, he and Allan Blomquist developed the game Dikki Painguin in: TKO for the Third Reich for the Nintendo Entertainment System as students at Carnegie Mellon.

== Career ==
=== Intern and programmer (2003–2005) ===
One of Druckmann's professors paid for him to attend the Game Developers Conference (GDC) in 2003, where he attended a presentation by Naughty Dog co-founder Jason Rubin. After Druckmann "bugged" Rubin, the latter gave him his business card. Some time later, Rubin contacted Druckmann and offered him an intern position, a first for Naughty Dog. By the time Druckmann responded, the position had been taken. When encouraged to apply for internships by CMU, Druckmann reached out to Rubin for advice and was told about a new internship at the studio. He was put in contact with game director Evan Wells, who offered him the internship after an interview at GDC. During this time, he had also been offered an intern producer position at Electronic Arts on The Sims 2; he extended the offer in order to attend Wells's interview. Druckmann joined Naughty Dog as a programming intern around May 2004. He began working on localization tools and gameplay programming on Jak 3 (2004). During this time, he offered assistance with additional design tasks. By the end of the internship in August, he was offered a full-time position by Wells and Stephen White, then co-presidents. He received credit for the second year of his master's degree through his work at Naughty Dog, earning the degree in 2005. He programmed the menu screens on Jak X: Combat Racing (2005), which he considered one of the most difficult tasks of his career, and continued to assist with smaller design tasks where possible.

=== Designer and writer (2005–2009) ===
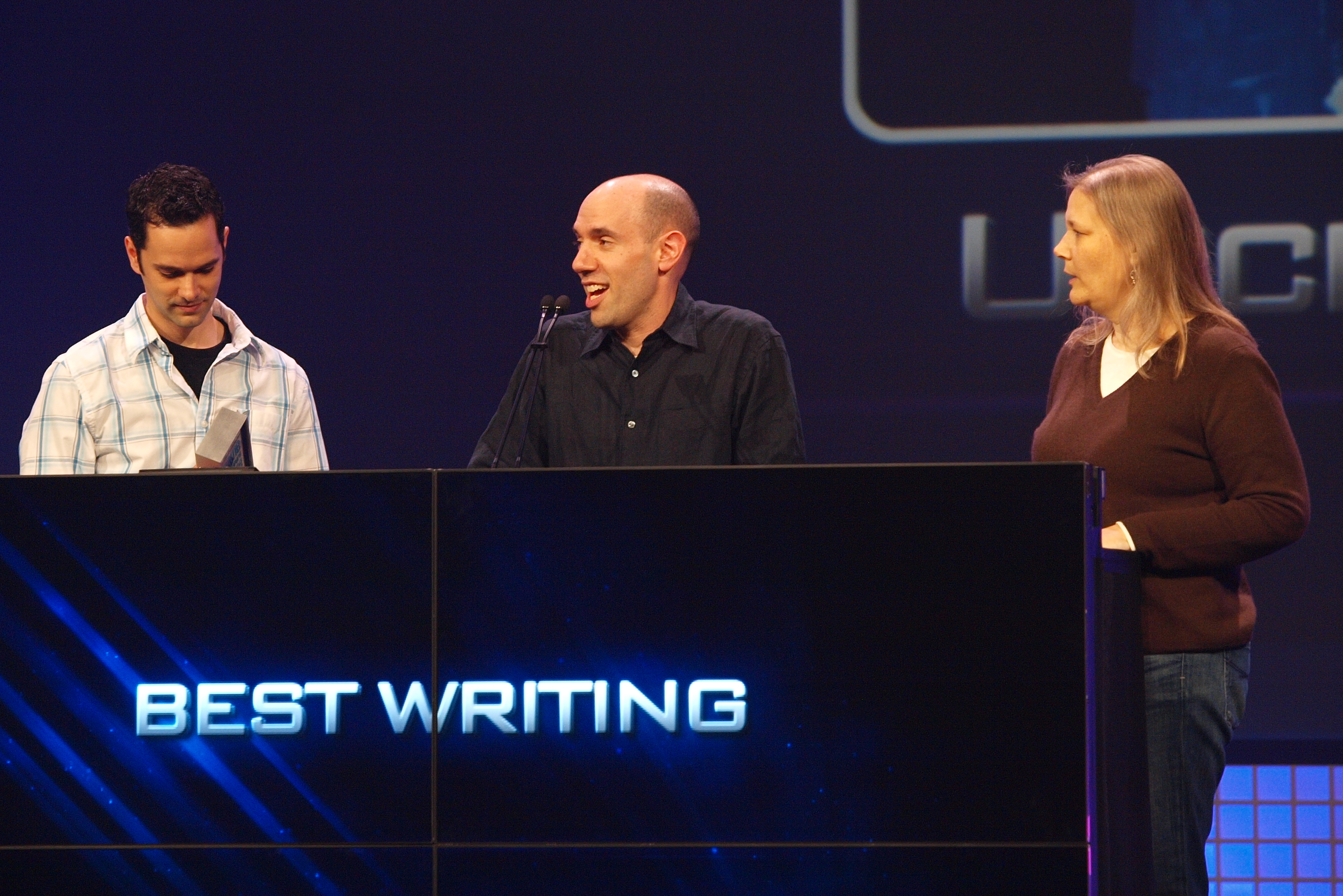
Druckmann (left) accepting the 2010 Game Developers Choice Award for Best Writing with Josh Scherr (center) and Amy Hennig (right)

During the development of Jak 3 and Jak X, Druckmann continually asked Wells about joining the design team. Wells restrained from transferring him, as he was originally employed as a programmer and lacked design experience, but agreed to review Druckmann's work if he completed them in his spare time. Druckmann iterated on several level designs with Wells's feedback, initially on graph paper and later using Adobe Illustrator. Following the development of Jak X, Wells concluded that Druckmann was skilled in design and gave him a design position for Jak and Daxter: The Lost Frontier. Several months into development, Wells transferred Druckmann to work as a game designer on Uncharted: Drake's Fortune (2007), which was facing development troubles; High Impact Games took over work on The Lost Frontier, which was released in 2009. In his position as game designer on Drake's Fortune, he worked closely with Amy Hennig to construct the story, before working on Uncharted 2: Among Thieves (2009) as a lead game designer, becoming more involved with the core writing.

In 2009, Druckmann worked on the motion comic Uncharted: Eye of Indra as writer and director. Eye of Indra tells the story of Nathan Drake prior to the events of Drake's Fortune. Druckmann's first graphic novel, A Second Chance at Sarah, was published by Ape Entertainment in February 2010. With illustrations by artist Joysuke Wong, the novel relates Druckmann's interest in traveling back in time to meet his wife at a younger age, an idea he found "cute and poetic". He felt he shared many similarities with the protagonist, Johnny, and noted "a lot of Johnny's flaws and fears are based on [his] own shortcomings". Critics particularly praised Wong's illustrations and Druckmann's writing and character development.

=== Creative director (2010–2018) ===
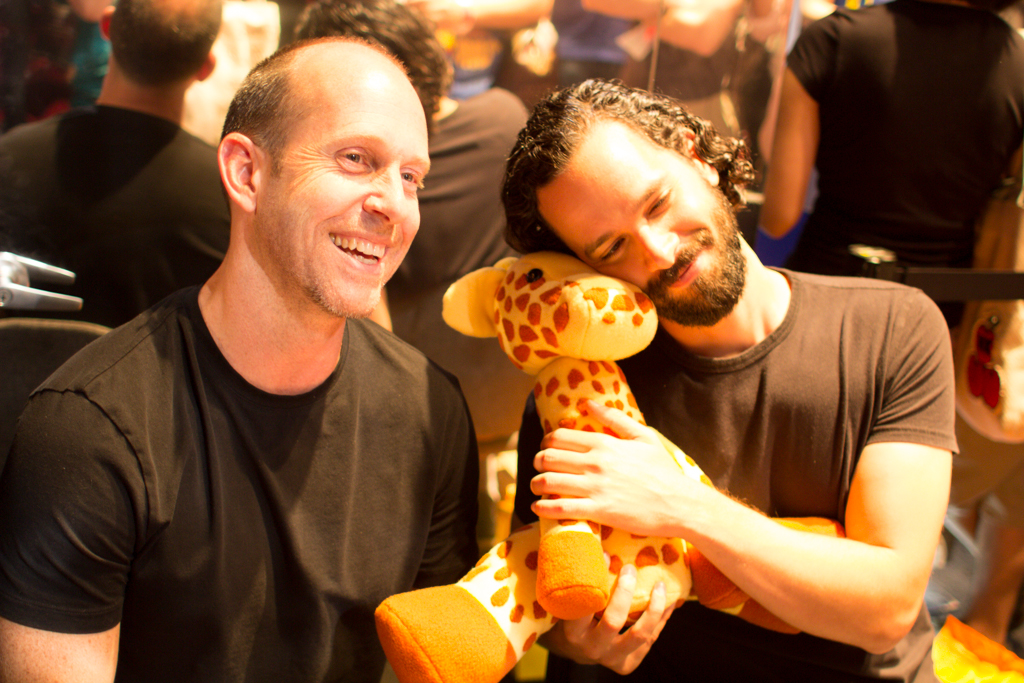
Druckmann (right) worked with game director Bruce Straley (left) on The Last of Us, The Last of Us: Left Behind, and Uncharted 4: A Thief's End.

Following the development of Uncharted 2, Naughty Dog split into two teams to work on projects concurrently. With one team working on Uncharted 3: Drake's Deception (2011), co-presidents Evan Wells and Christophe Balestra chose Druckmann and Bruce Straley to lead development on a new game; Druckmann was chosen for his determination and talent for design. Though they were originally set to develop a new game in the Jak and Daxter series, the team felt that they "weren't doing service to the fans", and decided to create a new game, titled The Last of Us. Druckmann was promoted to the game's creative director around a year into production.

For The Last of Us, Druckmann used a concept he created as a student at Carnegie Mellon: to merge the gameplay of Ico (2001), the setting of Night of the Living Dead (1968), and the lead character of Sin City (1991–2000). The protagonist would be tasked with protecting a young girl, but players would often assume control of the young girl, reversing the roles. He based The Last of Us on this concept, replacing the protagonist with Joel and naming the young girl Ellie. Druckmann intended The Last of Us to be "rooted firmly within reality", a departure from Naughty Dog's previous "light and loose" feeling. He took acting classes to better communicate with actors while directing. The game was released on June 14, 2013, with praise for Druckmann's work on the story. He earned numerous awards, including a BAFTA, D.I.C.E. Award, Game Developers Choice Award, Golden Joystick Award, and Writers Guild of America Award. The Last of Us is often regarded one of the best-written video games and one of the greatest video games ever made.

Druckmann later worked on a downloadable expansion pack, The Last of Us: Left Behind, a prequel focusing on Ellie's relationship with her friend Riley, which released in February 2014 to critical acclaim. He earned additional accolades for his work on Left Behind, including a second BAFTA and Writers Guild of America Award. In particular, he was praised for writing a scene involving a kiss between two female characters, which was named a "breakthrough moment" for video games. He also co-wrote the four-issue comic book miniseries The Last of Us: American Dreams with co-writer and artist Faith Erin Hicks. It was published by Dark Horse Comics, with the first issue released in April 2013, and was lauded for Druckmann's writing and character development. In March 2014, Sony announced that Druckmann was writing a film adaptation of The Last of Us, produced by Sam Raimi and distributed by Screen Gems. By January 2015, he had written the script's second draft, and performed a read-through with some actors. Very little work occurred following this, as Druckmann stated in April 2016 that the film had entered development hell, and in February 2018 said "I don't want that movie to be made."

Following Hennig's departure from Naughty Dog in March 2014, it was announced that Druckmann and Straley were working on Uncharted 4: A Thief's End (2016) as creative director and game director, respectively. Initial reports claimed that Hennig was "forced out" of Naughty Dog by Druckmann and Straley, though Wells and Balestra later denied this. Druckmann co-wrote the story alongside Scherr; Druckmann considered Scherr the "funny one", letting him write the humor of Uncharted 4 due to Druckmann's self-professed inability to write jokes. He appreciated the collaboration of writing on Uncharted 4, having written The Last of Us almost entirely independently. The game was released on May 10, 2016, and praised for its story. It was awarded Best Narrative at the Game Awards 2016 and Outstanding Achievement in Videogame Writing at the 69th Writers Guild of America Awards. Dave Meikleham of GamesRadar+ found Uncharted 4 among the best-written video games, and it is often regarded as among the greatest games. Druckmann acted as head of narrative development for Uncharted: The Lost Legacy (2017), worked as a playtester for What Remains of Edith Finch (2017), and was featured as a guest judge on an episode of Face Off in August 2017.

=== Studio leadership (2018–present) ===
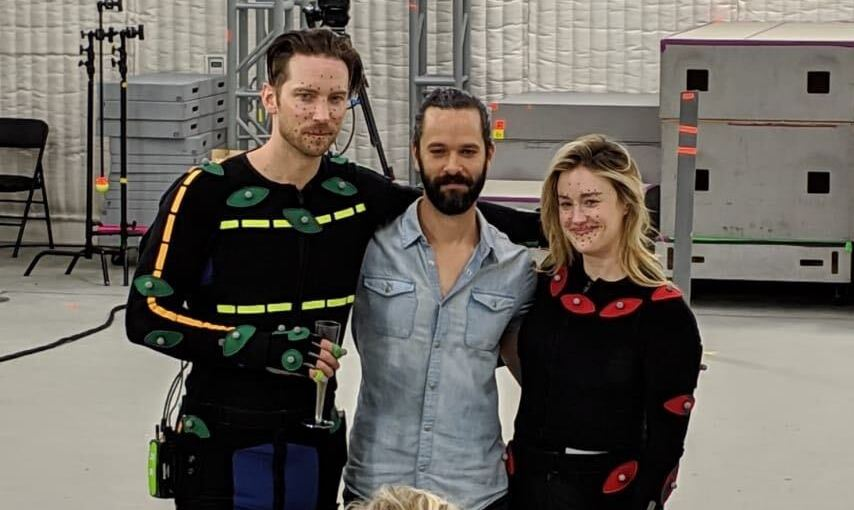
Druckmann (center) on the final day of motion capture production of The Last of Us Part II with Troy Baker (left) and Ashley Johnson (right)

Druckmann was promoted to vice president of Naughty Dog in March 2018. He returned as creative director for The Last of Us Part II (2020), co-writing the game alongside Halley Gross; Straley did not return to co-direct the game. The game's themes of revenge and retribution were inspired by Druckmann's own experiences growing up in Israel, where violence was a frequent topic. He specifically recalled watching footage of the 2000 Ramallah lynching, and how, after hearing the cheering crowds, his mind immediately turned to violent thoughts about bringing the perpetrators to justice; he later felt "gross and guilty" for having these thoughts. He wanted the player to feel a "thirst for revenge" before making them realize the reality of their actions. Two warring factions in the game were partly inspired by the tribalism and righteousness of the parties in the Israeli–Palestinian conflict, but it was not intended as an allegory of the conflict nor an explicit depiction of both sides. Druckmann noted that some members of the team felt reluctant about the game's cynicism, but ultimately he preferred a divisive story than a "mundane" one.

The Last of Us Part II released on June 19, 2020, to critical acclaim. Some critics praised the writing for its nuance and effectiveness, while others criticized its pacing and repetition of themes. The audience backlash towards the story led to Druckmann becoming the target of online hate and death threats, which were condemned by Naughty Dog. Druckmann makes a brief cameo appearance in the game as the voice of Briggs, a Washington Liberation Front soldier. An Easter egg in the game's collectible trading cards also references Druckmann in the fictional character Doctor Uckmann. The Last of Us Part II won more than 320 Game of the Year awards, which several outlets claimed broke the record set by The Witcher 3: Wild Hunt (2015); it was later surpassed by Elden Ring (2022). For their work on the game, Druckmann and Gross were awarded at the D.I.C.E. Awards, The Game Awards, Game Developers Choice Awards, Golden Joystick Awards, SXSW Gaming Awards, and Titanium Awards. Druckmann was also nominated at the Visual Effects Society Awards. The Last of Us Part II is often regarded as among the best-written video games and among the greatest ever made.

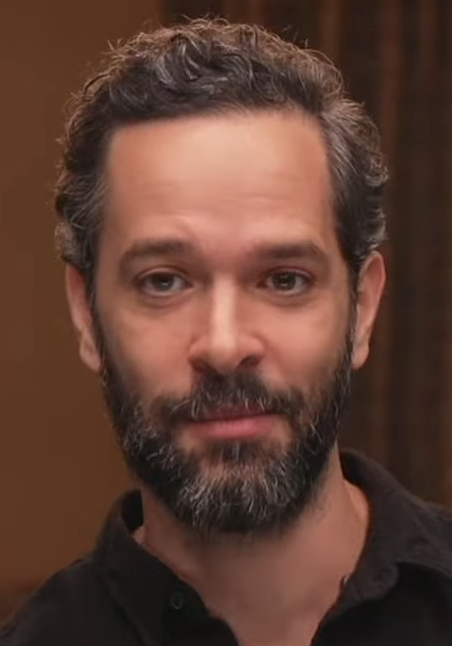
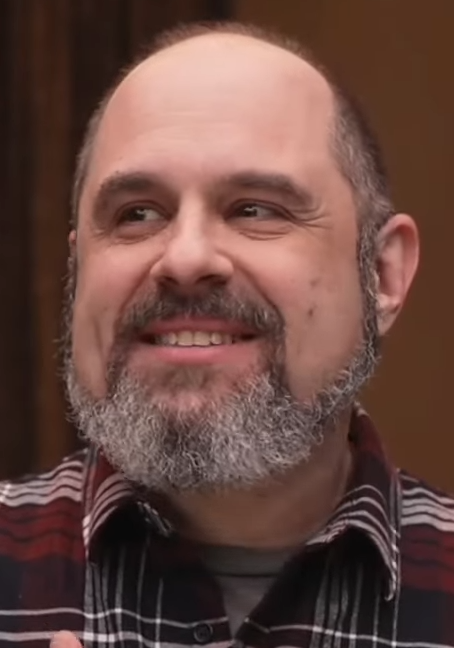
Druckmann created the television adaptation of The Last of Us with Craig Mazin (right).

Druckmann was promoted to co-president of Naughty Dog, serving alongside Wells, on December 4, 2020. He was included on the Variety500 list in December 2020, identifying the most influential business leaders in the media industry. Druckmann was an executive producer on the film Uncharted (2022); to promote the film, he appeared on Sony's Creator to Creator series alongside actor Tom Holland, director Ruben Fleischer, and producer Asad Qizilbash.

With Craig Mazin, Druckmann is a writer and executive producer on the television adaptation of The Last of Us for HBO. Druckmann directed an episode in October and November 2021; he felt his experience reinforced and reflected his experience in directing games. Druckmann noted the series was taking the opposite approach to adaptation than Uncharted; while Uncharted tells a new story with moments from the games to give "an Uncharted flavor", The Last of Us is a direct adaptation with minor deviations, allowing alterations such as changing character perspectives in a manner unachievable in an immersive game. The series premiered in January 2023 to positive reviews; several critics considered it the best live-action adaptation of a video game and praised the differences implemented by Mazin and Druckmann. Several critics praised Druckmann's directing on the second episode; Total Film's Russell praised his "keen eye for beauty in this shattered world", citing a shot of a frog on a piano as a standout. Druckmann was nominated for two awards and won one at the Writers Guild of America Awards for the series.

In December 2021, Druckmann presented Game of the Year at The Game Awards. He had a cameo voice appearance in Return to Monkey Island (2022). In April 2023, Druckmann wrote about Hidetaka Miyazaki, president and game director at FromSoftware, for Time's list of 100 influential people, naming Miyazaki's Elden Ring (2022) "a great ambassador for video games". In July, Wells announced he would retire from Naughty Dog by the year's end, making Druckmann the studio head and head of creative. Druckmann worked on the Last of Us-themed haunted house with Halloween Horror Nights, which ran at Universal Studios Hollywood and Orlando from September to October 2023. He had broached the idea in December 2021, and collaborated with Universal, rewriting the script to fit the characters' voices. Druckmann received the Andrew Yoon Legend Award at the 13th Annual New York Game Awards in January 2024, and was named among the Los Angeles Times's influential Los Angeles-based creators in June and Variety's top entertainment gaming leaders in November.

In May 2024, Sony published an interview with Druckmann as part of its corporate strategy event. Some quotes attributed to Druckmann were criticized by developers, journalists, and gamers, including that his next game "could redefine mainstream perceptions of gaming", which was described as "overly boastful", and that artificial intelligence would "revolutionize how content is being created" despite some "ethical issues", which some saw as incongruous with Naughty Dog's focus on nuanced and personal storytelling. Druckmann later stated the former quote was "not quite what I said" and some words and context were removed during editing. Sony subsequently removed the interview after finding "several significant errors and inaccuracies", and apologized to Druckmann.

For the second season of The Last of Us, based on Part II, Druckmann and Mazin were joined in the writers' room by Gross and Bo Shim. Druckmann worked on the story during development of The Last of Us Part II Remastered (2024), allowing him to revisit and analyze its decisions and intricacies. He considered himself biased when adapting the "intimately familiar" story and tried to keep an open mind with changes; he and Mazin generally agreed. Druckmann co-wrote the final two episodes with Gross and Mazin, and directed "The Price" from around May to July 2024; the season premiered in 2025. Several reviewers considered "The Price" the season's best episode; The Washington Post's Gene Park called it the season's "best shot, best paced and best written", and Druckmann's direction was praised. He was submitted for Outstanding Directing for a Drama Series at the 77th Primetime Emmy Awards.

At Summer Game Fest in June 2022, Druckmann revealed he was working on a new game; he later said he was assembling a writers' room to be "structured more like a TV show" than any of Naughty Dog's previous projects. In August, Druckmann revealed he was writing and directing the game, for which he later said was the "most excited he has ever been". The game, Intergalactic: The Heretic Prophet, was announced at the Game Awards in December 2024. It has been in development since 2020. Druckmann is leading development alongside co-game directors Matthew Gallant and Kurt Margenau and co-writer and narrative director Claire Carré. He is also working in a producing capacity on an unannounced game at Naughty Dog. Druckmann enjoyed splitting his time between projects, particularly in returning to Naughty Dog and seeing the work done by Gallant, Margenau, and Carré. In 2025, he featured on an episode of Creator to Creator alongside film director Alex Garland. In July, he stepped away from creative duties on the television adaptation of The Last of Us to focus on his duties at Naughty Dog, including work on Intergalactic; he felt he had attended "the best film school by working on the show" but wanted to return to his primary "love" and responsibility with video games. Druckmann's scripts for The Last of Us and Part II were published in a book by Dark Horse Books in December 2025.

== Writing style ==
"Simple story, complex characters."

— Druckmann's writing philosophy

Druckmann realized his writing philosophy when talking to game designer Cory Barlog: "simple story, complex characters". He dislikes video games with complicated exposition but enjoys writing complex character relationships. Throughout his writing, Druckmann approaches scenes with focus on every character, attempting to enter each one's mindset, and tries to ignore character tropes in an attempt to write "honestly". He writes with a minimalist mindset, often asking himself the true meaning behind each scene: "What's the least we have to say or do to convey that and no more?"

Before writing The Last of Us and Uncharted 4, Druckmann and Straley created entire outlines of the story, before exploring the narrative more intricately, discussing the "moment-to-moment beats" of each level that lead to a bigger event. They began with the middle of the story, as it is the core of the gameplay and narrative, before exploring the climax and character development. The Frame host John Horn identified a repeating theme in Druckmann's stories, including A Second Chance at Sarah and The Last of Us: characters attempting or hoping to alter their past in some way; Druckmann admitted he had not noticed this trend, though agreed with it and recognized its recurrence.

== Influences ==
Druckmann cites game writer Sam Lake as a large inspiration, naming himself a "longtime fan". Druckmann's favorite video games include Monkey Island 2: LeChuck's Revenge (1991), Ico, Metal Gear Solid 2: Sons of Liberty (2001), and Resident Evil 4 (2005), and he is often inspired by character-focused comics such as Preacher (1995–2000), and Y: The Last Man (2002–2008). He was influenced by the character-driven storytelling in Sierra games like King's Quest and Space Quest. While writing The Last of Us, Druckmann was inspired by several films, including: Unforgiven (1992), for its ability to make audiences support the protagonist despite his immorality; No Country for Old Men (2007), due to its subtle and sparse execution, forcing audience engagement; and Gravity (2013), in regards to simplicity and intensity.

== Views ==
"While working on The Last of Us ... I wanted to create one of the coolest, non-sexualized female protagonists, and I felt like with The Last of Us there was an opportunity here to change the industry."

— Neil Druckmann, IGDA keynote speech, 2013

Druckmann is a regular advocate of gender equality in video games, citing Anita Sarkeesian as an influence; he presented the Ambassador Award to Sarkeesian at the 2014 Game Developers Choice Awards and regularly advocated her projects. When Druckmann found that he regularly wrote about "white, straight, Christian male" characters, he was prompted to instead add diversity.

The Last of Us's Ellie was initially received negatively in early focus tests. Druckmann is proud that Ellie is a "strong, non-sexualized female lead character", and hoped that other developers would take similar approaches to characters without fear of unpopularity. Druckmann and Straley were surprised by some of the backlash to gender roles in The Last of Us, although Druckmann noted that "the more progress we make, the more those problems stand out". He declared it a "misconception" that female protagonists hinder game sales, evidenced by the success of The Last of Us. Throughout the development of Uncharted 4, he was influenced by concept artist Ashley Swidowski to include more female characters in the game, praising her for "constantly challenging me and pushing for diversity in our cast". Upon focus testers' criticism regarding the inclusion and portrayal of female characters in Uncharted 4, one of whom was forced to leave due to an outburst, Druckmann expressed "Wow, why does that matter?"

== Personal life ==
Druckmann resides with his children in Santa Monica, California, where he bought a property in 2019; his house was styled by designer Kim Gordon. Druckmann became a father during the development of The Last of Us, and has said his daughter was a "huge inspiration" to him when writing the game. He found her birth reinforced his ideas about family as he realized he would "do anything" for her. Druckmann's son was born around 2014; he was around the same age as Sam in the fifth episode of The Last of Us when it aired in 2023, making its events more emotional for Druckmann. In his spare time, Druckmann plays the guitar and joins his children in playing video games such as Animal Crossing and Pokémon.

Druckmann has a dent in his skull from being accidentally struck in the head with a golf club by a friend at the age of 16, which required 30 stitches. On his first day as director on The Last of Us, he suffered from headaches and began seeing double; he discovered the following day that he required emergency eye surgery, as an infection threatened the vision in his left eye. During production of The Last of Us Part II, he practiced intermittent fasting, which is referenced in one of the game's collectible cards. Early in pre-production on the television adaptation of The Last of Us, Druckmann and Mazin agreed to get matching tattoos of Ellie's switchblade if the series was successful; Mazin got his tattoo in February 2023, followed by Druckmann in March.

Druckmann speaks Hebrew and English, though he says his "Hebrew isn't that good". He holds American citizenship, having voted and promoted voting in the 2016 presidential election, 2018 midterm elections, 2020 primary elections, and 2020 presidential election. Druckmann donated US$10,000 to NARAL Pro-Choice America following the decision of Dobbs v. Jackson Women's Health Organization in June 2022, and US$2,500 each to both Israeli and Palestinian emergency response teams during the Gaza war in October 2023. In October, he signed the "No Hostage Left Behind" letter, an open letter asking the US President, Joe Biden, to ensure the release of hostages kidnapped by Hamas during the October 7 attacks and expressing the desire "for Israelis and Palestinians to live side by side in peace".

== Works ==
=== Video games ===
Year	Game	Role					Ref.
Year	Game	Creative director	Designer	Programmer	Writer	Title	Ref.
2004	Jak 3	No	No	Yes	No	Gameplay programmer	
2005	Jak X: Combat Racing	No	No	Yes	No	Gameplay programmer	
2007	Uncharted: Drake's Fortune	No	Yes	No	Yes	Game designer, co-writer	
2009	Uncharted 2: Among Thieves	No	Yes	No	Yes	Co-lead game designer, co-writer	
2009	Jak and Daxter: The Lost Frontier	No	No	No	Story	Original design and story	
2013	The Last of Us	Yes	No	No	Yes	Creative director, writer	
2014	The Last of Us: Left Behind	Yes	No	No	Yes	Creative director, writer	
2016	Uncharted 4: A Thief's End	Yes	No	No	Yes	Creative director, lead co-writer	
2017	Uncharted: The Lost Legacy	No	No	No	Narrative	Head of narrative development	
2020	The Last of Us Part II	Yes	No	No	Yes	Creative director, lead co-writer	
TBA	Intergalactic: The Heretic Prophet	Yes	No	No	Yes	Creative director, lead co-writer	

Other credits

- 2017 – What Remains of Edith Finch (playtester)
- 2018 – A Way Out (directors thanks)
- 2020 – Ghost of Tsushima (special thanks)
- 2022 – Return to Monkey Island (cameo voice role)

=== Film and television ===
Year(s)	Title	Role			Notes	Ref.
Year(s)	Title	Director	Producer	Writer	Notes	Ref.
2022	Uncharted	No	Executive	No	Film	
2023–present	The Last of Us	Yes (Note: Directed "Infected" and "The Price")	Executive	Yes (Note: Wrote "Left Behind". Co-wrote "When You're Lost in the Darkness" and "Look for the Light" with Craig Mazin, "The Price" and "Convergence" with Halley Gross and Mazin.)	Television series; also co-creator, co-showrunner (2023–2025)	

Appearances

- 2012 – Late Night with Jimmy Fallon (talk show; episode 653)
- 2013 – Grounded: Making The Last of Us (documentary)
- 2013 – Between the Lines with Barry Kibrick (talk show; season 13, episode 25)
- 2013 – How Videogames Changed the World (documentary)
- 2015 – Conversations with Creators (web series; episode 2)
- 2017 – The Game Makers: Inside Story (web series; 5 episodes)
- 2017 – Face Off (season 12, episode 7: "Feral Fungi")
- 2024 – Grounded II: Making The Last of Us Part II (documentary)

=== Literature ===
Year	Title	Role	Notes	Ref.
2009	Uncharted: Eye of Indra	Writer and director	Motion comic	
2010	A Second Chance at Sarah	Creator and writer	Graphic novel	
2013	The Last of Us: American Dreams	Co-writer	Graphic novel (four issues)	
2013	The Art of The Last of Us	Writer (introduction; with Bruce Straley)	Art book	
2014	The Art of Naughty Dog	Writer (chapter; with Bruce Straley)	Art book	
2020	The Art of The Last of Us Part II	Writer (foreword)	Art book	
2025	The Last of Us: Part I and Part II Scripts	Writer (with Halley Gross)	Script book	

== Awards and nominations ==
Date	Award / Publication	Category	Work	Result	Ref.
February 18, 2010	D.I.C.E. Awards	Outstanding Achievement in Story – Original	Uncharted 2: Among Thieves (Note: Co-nominated with Amy Hennig and Josh Scherr)	Won	
February 20, 2010	Writers Guild of America Awards	Videogame Writing	Uncharted 2: Among Thieves	Won	
March 12, 2010	Game Developers Choice Awards	Best Writing	Uncharted 2: Among Thieves	Won	
March 19, 2010	British Academy Games Awards	Story	Uncharted 2: Among Thieves	Won	
October 26, 2013	Golden Joystick Awards	Best Storytelling	The Last of Us	Won	
December 4, 2013	Inside Gaming Awards	Best Story	The Last of Us	Nominated	
December 21, 2013	Hardcore Gamer	Best Writing	The Last of Us	Won	
December 21, 2013	Hardcore Gamer	Best Story	The Last of Us	Nominated	
December 24, 2013	Destructoid	Best Story	The Last of Us	Nominated	
December 24, 2013	Giant Bomb	Best Story	The Last of Us	Won	
December 31, 2013	The Daily Telegraph	Best Script	The Last of Us	Won	
December 31, 2013	The Daily Telegraph	Best Director (Note: Co-nominated with Bruce Straley)	The Last of Us	Nominated	
January 7, 2014	GameTrailers	Best Story	The Last of Us	Won	
January 9, 2014	IGN	Best PS3 Story	The Last of Us	Won	
January 10, 2014	IGN	Best Overall Story	The Last of Us	Nominated	
February 1, 2014	Writers Guild of America Awards	Outstanding Achievement in Videogame Writing	The Last of Us	Won	
February 7, 2014	D.I.C.E. Awards	Outstanding Achievement in Story	The Last of Us	Won	
March 8, 2014	SXSW Gaming Awards	Excellence in Narrative	The Last of Us	Won	
March 12, 2014	British Academy Video Games Awards	Story	The Last of Us	Won	
March 19, 2014	Game Developers Choice Awards	Best Narrative	The Last of Us	Won	
February 14, 2015	Writers Guild of America Awards	Outstanding Achievement in Videogame Writing	The Last of Us: Left Behind	Won	
February 20, 2015	IGN Australia	Best Storytelling	The Last of Us: Left Behind	Won	
March 12, 2015	British Academy Video Games Awards	Story	The Last of Us: Left Behind	Won	
November 18, 2016	Golden Joystick Awards	Best Storytelling	Uncharted 4: A Thief's End (Note: Co-nominated with Josh Scherr)	Nominated	
December 1, 2016	The Game Awards	Best Narrative	Uncharted 4: A Thief's End	Won	
January 7, 2017	IGN	Best Story	Uncharted 4: A Thief's End	Runner-up (Note: Tied with Inside)	
February 19, 2017	Writers Guild of America Awards	Outstanding Achievement in Videogame Writing	Uncharted 4: A Thief's End	Won	
February 23, 2017	D.I.C.E. Awards	Outstanding Achievement in Story	Uncharted 4: A Thief's End	Won	
March 1, 2017	Game Developers Choice Awards	Best Narrative	Uncharted 4: A Thief's End	Nominated	
March 18, 2017	SXSW Gaming Awards	Excellence in Narrative	Uncharted 4: A Thief's End	Won	
April 6, 2017	British Academy Video Games Awards	Narrative	Uncharted 4: A Thief's End	Nominated	
November 24, 2020	Golden Joystick Awards	Best Storytelling (Note: Co-nominated with Halley Gross)	The Last of Us Part II	Won	
December 10, 2020	The Game Awards	Best Narrative	The Last of Us Part II	Won	
December 12, 2020	Titanium Awards	Best Narrative Design	The Last of Us Part II	Won	
December 22, 2020	IGN	Best Video Game Story	The Last of Us Part II	Won	
March 20, 2021	SXSW Gaming Awards	Excellence in Narrative	The Last of Us Part II	Won	
April 6, 2021	Visual Effects Society Awards	Outstanding Visual Effects in a Real-Time Project (Note: Co-nominated with Eben Cook, Erick Pangilinan, and John Sweeney)	The Last of Us Part II	Nominated	
April 8, 2021	D.I.C.E. Awards	Outstanding Achievement in Story (Note: Co-nominated with Halley Gross, Josh Scherr, and Ryan James)	The Last of Us Part II	Won	
April 8, 2021	D.I.C.E. Awards	Game of the Year (Note: Co-nominated with Evan Wells, Anthony Newman, and Kurt Margenau)	The Last of Us Part II	Nominated	
April 8, 2021	D.I.C.E. Awards	Adventure Game of the Year	The Last of Us Part II	Nominated	
April 8, 2021	D.I.C.E. Awards	Outstanding Achievement in Game Direction (Note: Co-nominated with Anthony Newman and Kurt Margenau)	The Last of Us Part II	Nominated	
July 21, 2021	Game Developers Choice Awards	Best Narrative	The Last of Us Part II	Won	
January 23, 2024	New York Game Awards	Andrew Yoon Legend Award	—N/a	Won	
April 14, 2024	Writers Guild of America Awards	New Series	The Last of Us (TV series) (Note: Co-nominated with Halley Gross, Craig Mazin, and Bo Shim)	Won	
April 14, 2024	Writers Guild of America Awards	Drama Series	The Last of Us (TV series)	Nominated	
September 7, 2025	Humanitas Prize	Drama Teleplay	The Last of Us: "The Price" (Note: Co-nominated with Halley Gross and Craig Mazin)	Nominated	
