= Mount Price =

Mount Price may refer to:

- Mount Price (British Columbia), Canada
- Mount Price (California), United States
- Mount Price (Washington), United States
- Mount Price (Antarctica)
- Mount Tom Price, Australia, see Hamersley Range

== See also ==
- Price (disambiguation)
- Price Peak, Marie Byrd Land, Antarctica
- Price Hill (disambiguation)
