= Jak and Daxter: The Lost Frontier =

2009 video game

- North American cover art
- Developer: High Impact Games
- Publisher: Sony Computer Entertainment
- Designer: Dave Goodrich
- Artist: Atsuko Kubota
- Writers: Richard Lemarchand; Neil Druckmann; Daniel Arey
- Composer: James Dooley
- Series: Jak and Daxter
- Platforms: PlayStation 2 PlayStation Portable
- Release: NA: November 3, 2009; AU: November 19, 2009; EU: November 20, 2009
- Genre: Platform
- Mode: Single-player

Jak and Daxter: The Lost Frontier is a 2009 platform video game developed by High Impact Games and published by Sony Computer Entertainment for the PlayStation 2 and PlayStation Portable (PSP). It is the sixth installment in the Jak and Daxter series. The player assumes the role of Jak, the angst-ridden hero enhanced by his exposure to Light and Dark Eco. Announced on April 1, 2009, the game was released November 3, 2009.

The game received generally mixed reviews from critics, but there was praise for the graphics, gameplay, and aerial fights. Jak and Daxter: The Lost Frontier was later made available for purchase on PlayStation 4 and PlayStation 5 in March 2024, featuring new unlockable trophies.

== Gameplay ==
Similar to other games in the series, The Lost Frontier features a Hero Mode where players are able to replay the game. Weapons, armor, powers, secrets, and unspent Precursor orbs are retained through each playthrough.

== Plot ==
The game begins with Jak and Daxter, escorting Keira on her journey to become a Sage and help to find the reason for a worldwide Eco shortage. After an encounter with Captain Phoenix, an Eco-seeking Sky Pirate, Jak crash-lands on an island at the Brink (the edge of their world) and sets off in search of Eco with which to repair his Hellcat. After a successful take-off, Jak must fight off Sky Pirates attacking the ACS Behemoth, an aerial warship captained by Duke Skyheed of Aeropa. Jak is given an instrument called the Eco Seeker which would lead to an "Eco Core". He is unable to power it because the Eco instability prevents him from using his own Eco powers (including preventing him from turning into Dark Jak), but Keira is granted permission to study it for a week if Jak proves himself in a test of his fighting skills in the city's danger course. Daxter falls into the sewers of Aeropa on the way back, where he discovers that there is Dark Eco in the city. He ends up being tainted further by Dark Eco flowing out of a pipe and is temporarily transformed into "Dark Daxter"; he becomes black, spiky, and in no mood for "soft underpants."

Then, Captain Phoenix attacks the building and steals both the Eco Seeker and Keira. Jak and Daxter chase Phoenix but are led into a trap, resulting in them crash-landing back on the Island again. On the Island the duo meet a Castaway, who knows that Jak has been touched by Dark Eco but can't remember who he was or why he was on the island. He mentions that he built several robots the duo encountered on the Island, but they turned against him. He also offers to fix Jak's Hellcat, but requires a Velonium Power Pod from the most dangerous robot he created, the Uber-bot 888. After Jak and Daxter get the Power Pod, the Castaway fixes his ship, and later sneaks on board. When Jak and Daxter take off they manage to disable Phoenix's ship and land. On board, Jak and Phoenix argue and tip the Eco Seeker overboard accidentally, so both return to the Island once more to retrieve it from a volcanic crater; Keira intervenes and makes them call a truce and shake hands. The Eco Seeker needs more Light Eco to work and they travel to an old research rig used by the Aeropans. At the rig, Jak comes across a testing table. Suddenly remembering his own experience with the same device during his time in Baron Praxis' prison, he realizes that someone has been experimenting with Dark Eco, vowing to destroy those responsible. After finding the Light Eco, Daxter is separated from the group again and transformed into Dark Daxter once more.

After the Light Eco is inserted into the Seeker, Jak finds out that it is missing three parts, and they travel to the pirate town Far Drop to get one piece from a pirate. When they travel to an Old Aeropan Barracks, where they find one of the Coordinates, the Castaway reveals that he is (or once was) a Dark Eco Sage and that he built the facility for the Aeropans. Phoenix reveals that he was once the commander of the Aeropan Air Forces. He was put in charge of a secret weapons program to make a new kind of warrior. When he found out what they were doing, he refused and tried to stop the program, but Skyheed wouldn't hear of it. So, he took the only option left and kidnapped the program's chief scientist, the Castaway. In the scuffle, the Castaway took a blow to his head and suffered amnesia; he was marooned on Brink Island in an attempt to hide his work from the Aeropans. Phoenix further explains that Skyheed spread the dark power to all the Aeropans, who declared him an outlaw and he vowed to destroy all dark warriors, including Jak. Keira protests, saying that Jak isn't a monster, even though Phoenix had seen what Jak was; Keira ultimately gives Phoenix an ultimatum to spare Jak if he cared for her at all. The Castaway says that Jak can be used to undo the damage that the Aeropans had done, being "a warrior who proves that Dark Eco can be controlled, or at least managed." They agree to take on the Aeropans.

When the location of the third coordinate sphere is found, the duo flies the Phantom Blade to Sector Zero, a mysterious location beyond the edge of the world. Jak and Daxter get the third sphere, but the Behemoth attacks their ship and Jak has to defend it. Back on board, Jak, Daxter, Keira, Phoenix and the crew fix the Eco Seeker, which points back to the abandoned research rig. Phoenix recalls that the rig was built over strange formations, later revealed to be an ancient Precursor facility. When they reach the Eco Core, Keira tries to fix it. Shortly after, Phoenix's right-hand man, Klout, arrives with Skyheed and reveals he was paid off by Skyheed in exchange for the location of the Core. Skyheed orders everyone killed except Jak, because he wants to study his control over Dark Eco. However, Keira activates an energy discharge from the Eco Core. The Eco radiation kills Klout and stuns Skyheed while Jak, Daxter, Keira, and Phoenix escape.

They receive a message stating that the Aeropans have laid siege to Far Drop. Jak and Daxter are sent to defeat the Aeropan Shock Troops at Far Drop, but the Behemoth appears to destroy it. Jak and Daxter successfully cause the Aeropans to retreat by destroying their weapons. Phoenix wants revenge on Skyheed for the attack. Then another message is transmitted anonymously, telling them to use the old Barracks warp gate. The group get through the warp gate while Daxter becomes Dark Daxter once again to hold off the Aeropan soldiers before catching up with the others. Upon arriving in Aeropa, Jak has to destroy the Weapons Control System to get his weapons working again, then head up to the palace to defeat Skyheed. But when Jak encounters the duke, Skyheed begins absorbing massive amounts of Dark Eco which transform him into a giant Dark Eco monster. Skyheed's chancellor Ruskin shows up and reveals he helped the heroes feeling what Skyheed had done to his own people was wrong; Skyheed responds by shooting Ruskin with an energy blast, causing him to fall to his death. Jak tries to defeat him but Skyheed escapes on an Airship and retreats to the Behemoth with the intention of using the Eco Core to ensure both Aeropa's survival and dominance of the world.

During the confrontation at the Eco Core, the Phantom Blade disables the shields surrounding the Behemoth, while Jak destroys the weapon systems and Eco Crystals. Phoenix then flies the Phantom Blade between the Eco Core and Behemoth to prevent them from draining the Core, sacrificing himself in the process; cutting off the Eco flow leaves the Behemoth vulnerable to attacks. A forlorn Keira then installs a Light Eco Beam in the Hellcat to finish the Behemoth off, destroying Skyheed and the Aeropans. With Aeropa finally defeated, the balance of Eco is restored. Keira then activates the Eco Core which channels energy which travels to Eco Vents around the world, ending the Eco shortage and reduces the storm and quake activity in all directions. In the process, Keira finds she is now able to channel Eco, with Tym (the Castaway) informing her that she may be turning into a Sage. She also sees that one vent flows out beyond the Brink and she, Jak and Daxter decide to investigate.

== Soundtrack ==
Jak and Daxter: The Lost Frontier Original Soundtrack

Soundtrack album by Jim Dooley
- Released: November 3, 2009
- Genre: Video game soundtrack
- Length: 38:44
- Label: Sony Computer Entertainment

Jak and Daxter: The Lost Frontier Original Soundtrack, composed by James Dooley, was released for digital download by Sony Computer Entertainment on November 2, 2009.

=== Track listing ===
No.	Title	Length
1.	"Hellcat to the Rescue"	2:04
2.	"The Brink"	3:23
3.	"Galleon Conflict"	2:06
4.	"Laser Defense"	3:31
5.	"Sounds of Fardrop"	3:24
6.	"Dark Eco Warrior Training Camp"	3:18
7.	"Super-Dark-Daxter Rampage, Go!"	3:19
8.	"Behemoth Air Battle"	2:39
9.	"Parallel Universe"	4:18
10.	"Voices of Aeropa"	2:38
11.	"Ambushed"	2:40
12.	"A Captain's Sacrifice"	2:11
13.	"Daxterball"	3:40
14.	"Jak vs. the Arborcider"	1:33
Total length:		38:44

== Development ==
Following the release of Jak X: Combat Racing in 2005, Naughty Dog began development of The Lost Frontier under the working title Jak PSP. The game was originally planned as a PlayStation Portable exclusive and was in the process of being developed by Naughty Dog when it was cancelled. Evan Wells revealed that they were unable to sustain the game's development alongside Uncharted: Drake's Fortune (2007) and made the decision to pass the project onto High Impact Games.

== Reception ==
Reception

Aggregate score
Aggregator	Score
Metacritic	72/100 (PS2); 71/100 (PSP)

Review scores
Publication	Score
1Up.com	B (PSP)
Eurogamer	8/10 (PSP)
G4	4/5 (PSP)
Game Informer	7.75/10 (PSP)
GameSpot	7.5/10 (PSP)
IGN	7.4/10 (PS2); 7.4/10 (PSP)

Jak and Daxter: The Lost Frontier received "mixed or average" reviews from critics, according to review aggregator website Metacritic.

GameSpot gave the game 7.5/10, calling it "a good addition to Sony's much-loved series" and went on to praise the "solid gameplay, challenging platform puzzles and wacky humour" though felt that the "Dark Daxter levels feel tacked on." IGN said: "There's fun to be had here, but it could've been polished a bit more to bring out the value" and awarded it 7.4/10. Eurogamer felt "Jak & Daxter: The Lost Frontier is one of the best platformers available for PSP/PS2", and continued: "It also stands as evidence that there's life in the old Naughty Dog series yet."
