= Intergalactic: The Heretic Prophet =

Upcoming video game

- Developer: Naughty Dog
- Publisher: Sony Interactive Entertainment
- Directors: Neil Druckmann; Matthew Gallant; Kurt Margenau
- Writers: Neil Druckmann; Claire Carré
- Composers: Trent Reznor; Atticus Ross
- Platform: PlayStation 5
- Genre: Action-adventure

Intergalactic: The Heretic Prophet is an upcoming action-adventure game developed by Naughty Dog and published by Sony Interactive Entertainment for the PlayStation 5. Set thousands of years in the future, it follows the bounty hunter Jordan A. Mun (Tati Gabrielle), who is stranded on a distant and isolated planet searching for a crime syndicate. Intergalactic is Naughty Dog's first original intellectual property since The Last of Us in 2013.

Development began in 2020 after the release of The Last of Us Part II and is led by creative director Neil Druckmann, game directors Matthew Gallant and Kurt Margenau, and narrative director Claire Carré. Druckmann assembled a writers' room for the narrative, for which thousands of years of fictional history was written. The story centers on a fictional religion and includes science fiction elements, taking inspiration from several anime. Its score is composed by Trent Reznor and Atticus Ross.

== Premise ==
Intergalactic: The Heretic Prophet is an action-adventure game set around two thousand years in the future, in an alternate universe where advanced space travel existed by 1986. Veteran bounty hunter Jordan A. Mun becomes stranded on a distant planet, Sempiria, while tracking the legendary "Five Aces" criminal syndicate. For over 600 years, Sempiria has been cut off from outside contact and no one has been able to leave it. In seeking to escape, Jordan discovers information about the history of the planet and its people, and fights hostile, blade-wielding robots.

== Development ==
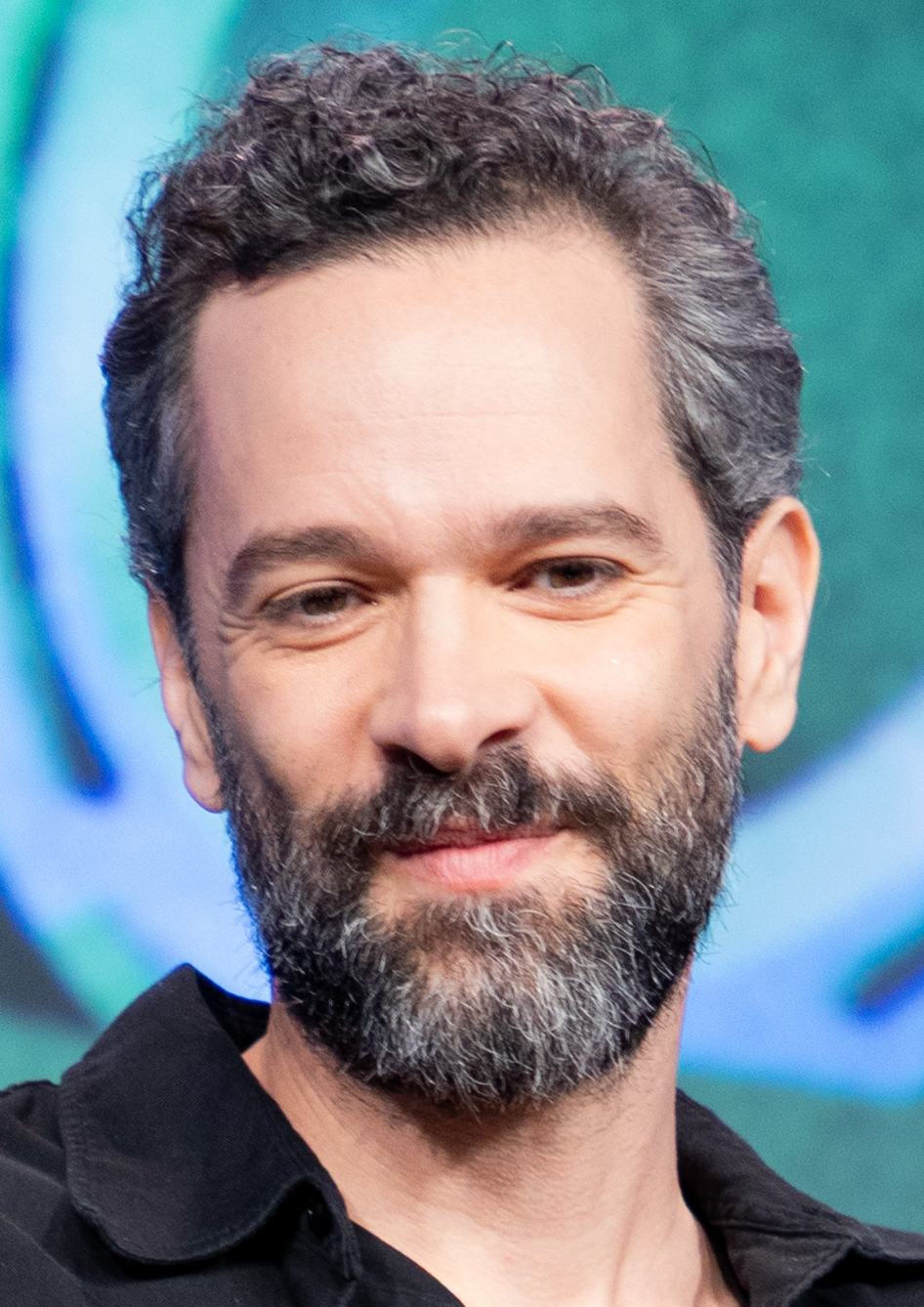
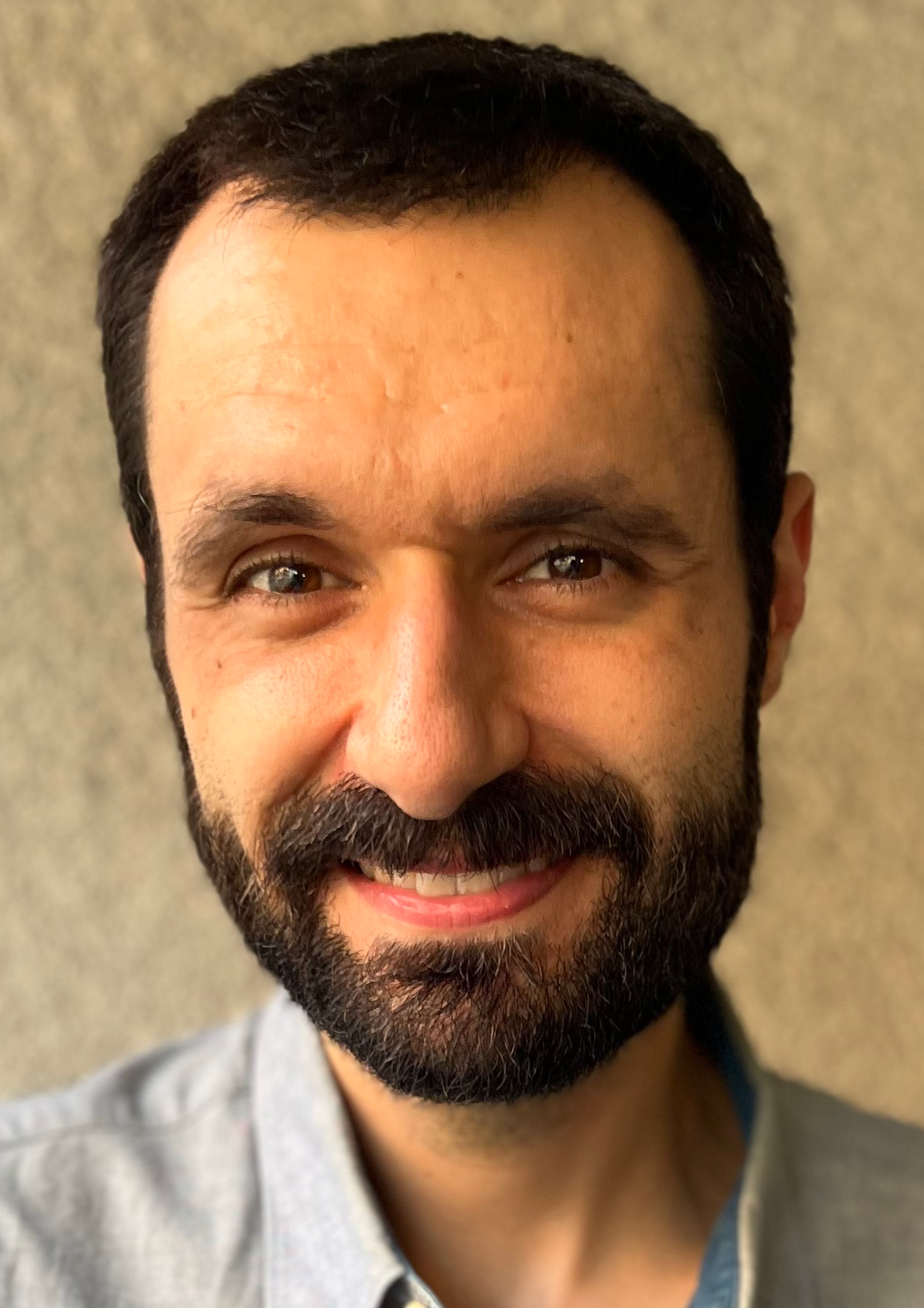
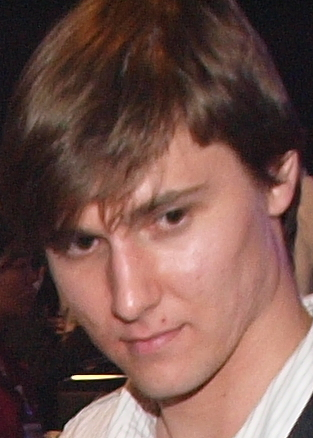
Development of Intergalactic: The Heretic Prophet is led by creative director Neil Druckmann (left) and game directors Matthew Gallant (center) and Kurt Margenau (right).

Naughty Dog began developing Intergalactic: The Heretic Prophet for the PlayStation 5 after The Last of Us Part II's release in 2020. Neil Druckmann leads the 250-person team as creative director and writer, alongside game directors Matthew Gallant and Kurt Margenau and narrative director Claire Carré. Intergalactic is set to start a new franchise for Naughty Dog, marking its first original story since The Last of Us (2013). Druckmann considered it the studio's most expansive and ambitious game, and likely its most expensive. The score is composed by Trent Reznor and Atticus Ross, the former's first full video game soundtrack since Quake (1996).

Druckmann revealed he was working on a new game at Summer Game Fest in June 2022. Most of the development team was moved from The Last of Us Online, which was cancelled in 2023 partly to avoid withholding resources from Intergalactic. Druckmann felt Gallant, Margenau, and Carré "stepped up" during development to allow him to work on the television adaptation of The Last of Us; he stepped away from his creative duties on the series in July 2025, ahead of the third season, to focus on Intergalactic.

Following the development of The Last of Us Part II, Naughty Dog pledged to address its crunch culture for the development of its next game. From late October to mid-December 2025, Naughty Dog staff were asked to work at least eight additional hours per week (but not exceed 60 hours) and to return to the office for five days each week (up from three) to complete an internal demo for review by the game's publisher, Sony Interactive Entertainment. Performance capture production wrapped on August 31, 2026.

=== Narrative and gameplay design ===
Naughty Dog assembled a writers' room for Intergalactic: The Heretic Prophet, structuring the process "more like a TV show" than its previous projects; writers include Druckmann, Carré, and Shanon M. Ingles, who joined the writing team in 2025. The narrative explores "what happens when you put your faith in different institutions", according to Druckmann. It is centered on a fictional religion, and includes science fiction elements, taking inspiration from anime like Akira (1988) and Cowboy Bebop (1998). The narrative outline and concepts were written long before specific story elements as the team focused on prototyping gameplay; they created thousands of years of history for Sempiria's religion.

The developers sought to combine their three previous franchises—the science-fiction fantasy of Jak and Daxter, action-adventure of Uncharted, and serious drama of The Last of Us—to blend cinematic storytelling with more intricate gameplay systems. They wanted to expand upon the gameplay of Uncharted and The Last of Us and use action and genre to "hide" a personal, philosophical narrative without the constraints of grounded reality; Druckmann felt the lack of groundedness made the science fiction genre more difficult. The developers wanted the player to feel lost and alone, partly achieved by the lack of non-playable allies like other Naughty Dog games.

=== Casting and characters ===
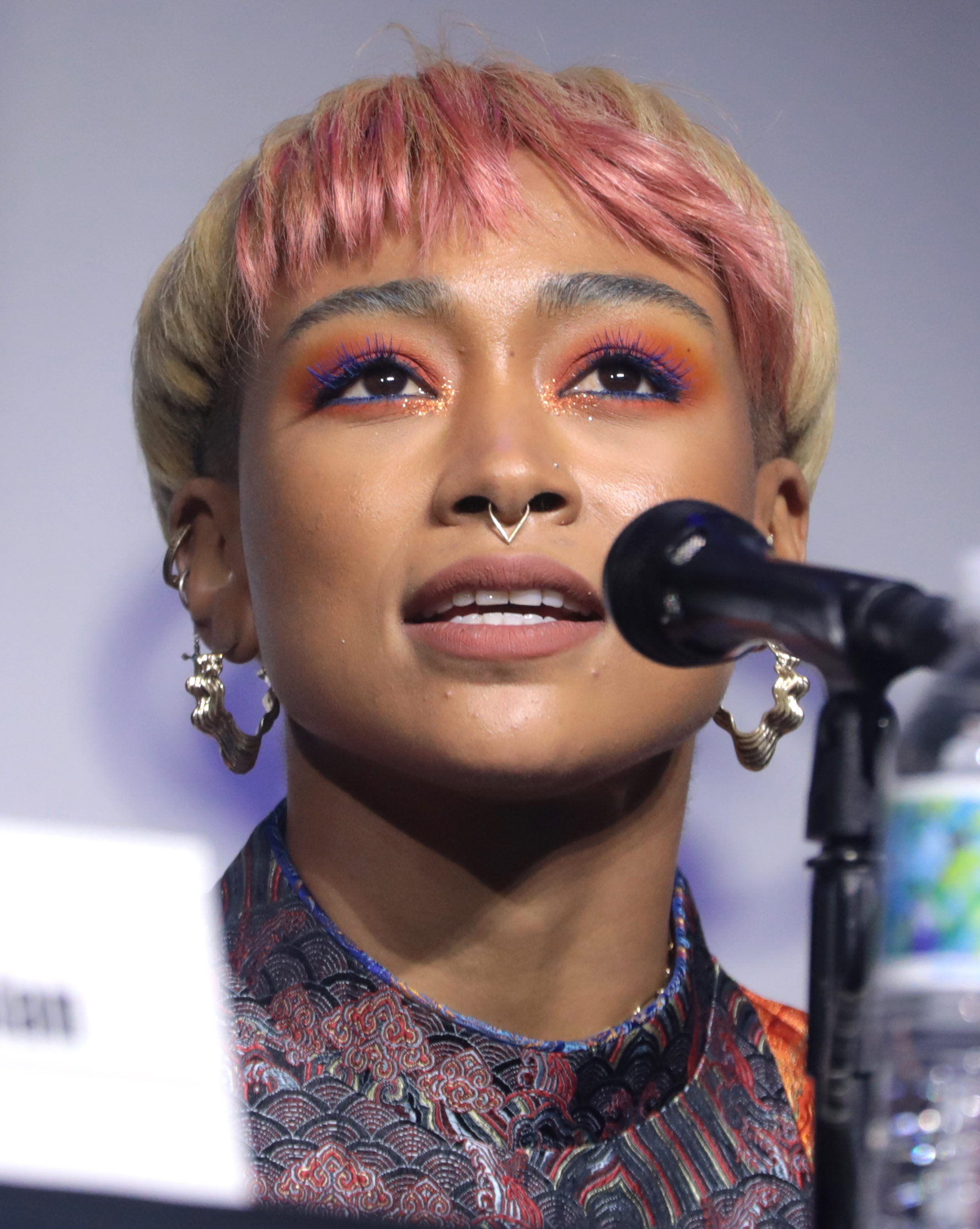
Tati Gabrielle was cast as Jordan A. Mun after her role in The Last of Us's second season.

Tati Gabrielle portrays Jordan. She previously starred in the film Uncharted (2022) and the second season of The Last of Us (2025), both adaptations of Naughty Dog franchises. Druckmann pitched her the story after casting her in the latter, and she auditioned alongside Troy Baker; Druckmann considered her a standout during the casting process, comparing her audition to Ashley Johnson's for The Last of Us's Ellie. A spiritual person, Gabrielle was drawn to Intergalactic due to its focus on faith; she felt it represented "such a different side of Naughty Dog". Her performance influenced the writing of the character and her arc; Druckmann felt she added a "charm" and "bad-ass-ness". Jordan's initials are a reference to Naughty Dog's former name, JAM Software.

Halley Gross, who co-wrote The Last of Us Part II, portrays AJ, Jordan's agent. Members of the Five Aces include Colin Graves (portrayed by Kumail Nanjiani) and other members played by Tony Dalton, Ashley Scott, and Stephen A. Chang in leading roles. Scott portrayed Maria in The Last of Us and Part II, while Chang played Jesse in the latter. Dalton was cast after appearing in an episode of The Last of Us directed by Druckmann, who offered him the role immediately after showing him parts of the game on Zoom; it is Dalton's first video game, and he found the performance capture process unique and impressive.

Several other actors returned to work with Naughty Dog, including Troy Baker, Merle Dandridge, and Robin Atkin Downes in undisclosed roles; Dandridge previously appeared both The Last of Us games, its television adaptation, and Uncharted 4: A Thief's End (2016), while Downes was in The Last of Us and all Uncharted games. Druckmann enjoyed working with Baker again after a five-year gap since his role as Joel in The Last of Us Part II.

== Promotion and release ==
Sony trademarked Intergalactic: The Heretic Prophet in February 2024. Naughty Dog revealed the game at the Game Awards on December 12, 2024, alongside its first trailer, which Druckmann felt "doesn't even scratch the surface" of its content. The trailer depicts Jordan watching anime, listening to 1980s music on a Sony CD player, flying a Porsche spaceship, and wearing Adidas sneakers. Druckmann spent time searching for an appropriate 1980s song about faith to use in the trailer, eventually selecting "It's a Sin" by the Pet Shop Boys. Some employees worked long hours to finish the trailer. Several studios approached Naughty Dog after its release to discuss adaptations and partnerships, though Druckmann preferred to focus on the game before expanding its universe.

Druckmann said the team "still have a ways to go" with development by March 2025; according to Bloomberg News's Jason Schreier, the game is internally scheduled for mid-2027. Jordan's jacket was added as a skin for Ellie in The Last of Us Part II Remastered on April 3, 2025. The game was nominated for Most Wanted Game at the Golden Joystick Awards in 2026. On The Last of Us Day in September 2026, Druckmann released concept artwork from Intergalactic and promised a full reveal of the game in 2027. In November, Druckmann said production was in its "last stages", with the game fully playable and development focused on "refining and polishing".
