= A Second Chance at Sarah =

2010 fantasy graphic novel

- Front cover of Dark Horse Comics release
- Date: February 24, 2010 (Note: Re-published by Dark Horse Comics on August 20, 2014)
- Main characters: Johnny
- Publisher: Ape Entertainment

Creative team
- Writer: Neil Druckmann
- Artist: Joysuke Wong
- Letterer: Michael Thomas
- Creator: Neil Druckmann
- Editors: Kevin Freeman; Brendan Wright
- ISBN: 978-1-61655-423-1

A Second Chance at Sarah is a fantasy graphic novel written by Neil Druckmann, with illustrations by Joysuke Wong. The novel was originally published by Ape Entertainment on February 24, 2010; Dark Horse Comics re-released the novel on August 20, 2014. The book follows Johnny, who makes a deal with a demon to go back in time and save his dying wife, who fell into a coma upon the birth of their son.

Druckmann wrote the story in his spare time while working at the video game developer Naughty Dog. He considers A Second Chance at Sarah to be a personal story, focusing on the characters instead of the supernatural elements. Druckmann worked on several unsuccessful comic book ideas and pitches, before collaborating with Wong on A Second Chance at Sarah. Wong's work on the book was extensive, as she refined and extended Druckmann's initial concepts and ideas. The two worked on the book for over a year. The book received generally positive reviews from critics, who praised Wong's illustrations, Druckmann's writing, and the character development.

== Publication history ==
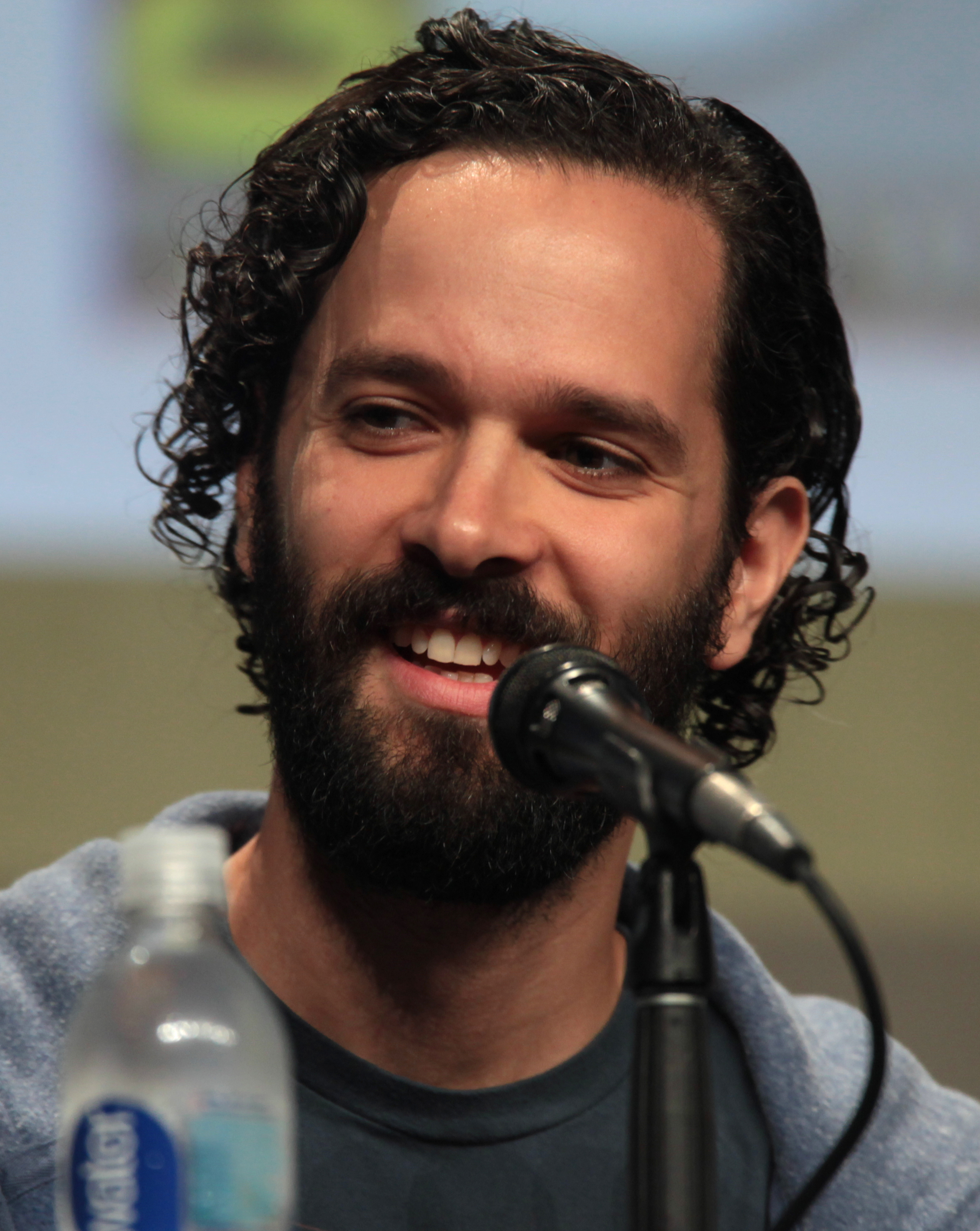
A Second Chance at Sarah was written and conceived by Neil Druckmann.

Writer Neil Druckmann considered A Second Chance at Sarah a "personal story" he "wanted to tell". As a child, he was interested in creating a comic book and his ideas developed as he aged. The novel was inspired by Druckmann's interest in traveling back in time to meet his wife at a younger age, an idea he found "cute and poetic". The idea itself was inspired by time travel stories, particularly the Back to the Future film series (1985–1990). Druckmann had developed a different comic book pitch for over a year, for which he wrote, drew, and lettered in full detail. When the pitch was rejected, he decided to work with an artist to finish a new pitch in a shorter time. He contacted artist Joysuke Wong, who agreed to collaborate; Druckmann called the collaboration the "easiest decision" he made while working on the comic, as he was impressed by her artwork.

Druckmann and Wong developed the pitch—the first six pages of the story—in about two months. They worked on the comic for over a year prior in total. Druckmann created a schedule for his work on the comic, primarily working at night due to his job at video game developer Naughty Dog, where he was working on Uncharted 2: Among Thieves (2009). He ensured most of the writing and thumbnails were complete prior to crunch time on Uncharted 2, as he felt it would be difficult to work on both projects simultaneously. Druckmann originally wrote A Second Chance at Sarah as a three-issue series, but narrowed it to a single graphic novel for ease of publishing. He felt there was a possibility a first issue would not be successful enough to justify printing more. While writing the script, Druckmann drew thumbnail pages to visualize the story's flow. While writing, he switched between the thumbnails and the scripts as he felt "having the two influence each other keeps the process fresh and organic".

Most artwork underwent similar stages of development: Druckmann's thumbnail drawings, Wong's sketching, refining, blocking, and painting.

When he completed the script and thumbnails, Druckmann sent them to Wong, who interpreted the writing into her own style by sketching rough pages, ensuring the compositions worked well. She refined the pages, conveying the subtlety in the emotions of the characters; Druckmann and Wong wanted to avoid melodramatic scenes in both writing and art. Wong added color to the pages. Druckmann expressed the importance of using colors to separate the different time periods of the story, and to mirror Johnny's emotional journey. The final step for Wong was painting, which involved defining details; Druckmann said painting the artwork "[transforms] the rigid feel of the earlier versions to the unrestrained painterly look ... in the final pages".

Druckmann felt A Second Chance at Sarah is "a love story driven by grounded characters", not about the demons or time travel; he considered the latter a "secret weapon" to attract more readers and found it necessary to advance the story. Druckmann considered the characters "interesting, yet flawed", and he and Wong worked to "portray the subtlety of emotions". Druckmann felt he shared many similarities with protagonist Johnny and "a lot of Johnny's flaws and fears are based on [his] own shortcomings". He used the character to deal with his own fears of adulthood and of losing his wife, considering Johnny an "exaggerated version" of himself. When seeking potential publishers for the comic, Druckmann contacted Ape Entertainment due to his fondness of "the quality and the variety of their books". After submitting the pitch, he was contacted by chief executive officer David Hedgecock, who was enthusiastic about publishing the book despite its marketing challenges. The book was re-published by Dark Horse Comics on August 20, 2014.

== Plot ==
After the birth of their son, Johnny's wife Sarah falls into a coma. Johnny soon discovers her talisman, which she had previously used to make a deal with a demon to save the life of her sister Rachel, unbeknownst to Johnny. In order to save Sarah, Johnny also makes a deal with the demon, and is transported back to 1995, where he possesses the body of his younger self. He meets a younger Sarah, who invites him to a party. As they travel to the party, Johnny informs Sarah of the situation, but she dismisses it as a pick-up attempt. When they arrive, Johnny sees Rachel with the talisman and tells her to dispose of it; without responding, she ends the party. After she leaves, Rachel is involved in a car accident, and is transported to the hospital. Sarah, who now believes Johnny's story, goes to make a deal with the demon in order to save Rachel. However, upon discovering that the demon demands the sacrifice of Johnny and Sarah's child, Sarah destroys the talisman, and Rachel dies. These events alter those of the present day: Sarah never fell into a coma and instead lives normally with Johnny and their son.

== Reception ==
Joysuke Wong's illustrations were praised for their subtlety and appropriateness.

A Second Chance at Sarah received generally positive reviews. Praise was particularly directed at Wong's illustrations, as well as Druckmann's writing and character development, which were said to complement each other.

Reviewers praised the comic's artwork. Greg Ellner of The Pullbox called it "the perfect coupling to Druckmann's story", stating Wong "has a firm grasp of the intricacies of visual story telling". Following the Nerd's Dave Bowling felt, through the artwork, the book "truly comes to life". Peter Paltridge of PopGeeks praised the "rough and sketchy" look to the artwork, and found it was fitting to the story. ComicBuzz's Ellen Murray wrote the artwork has a "beautiful flow", praising the use of colors. Jacqueline Lopez of Fanboy Comics called the artwork "stunning", comparing it to the Fables series (2002–15). Jef Fox, writing for I Smell Sheep, found the artwork "breathtaking", and felt it evoked feelings of nostalgia. HorrorTalk's James Ferguson echoed similar remarks, praising the subtlety of Wong's artwork and naming it "clean and pure".

The comic's story also received positive reactions. Following the Nerd's Bowling called it "extremely well-written", commending its ability to attract readers and make them empathize with the characters. Paltridge of PopGeeks declared the story "even better" than Druckmann's work on The Last of Us (2013). Ellner of The Pullbox praised the story, noting a particular connection with the character of Johnny early in the story. Lopez of Fanboy Comics found the "character complexity is a bit lacking", but felt the pacing of the story is helpful in understanding plot points. Doreen Sheridan, writing for I Want My Two Dollars!, felt the "dialogue is a little clunky, but it's a satisfying read nonetheless". ComicBuzz's Murray criticized the short length of the story, commenting on the lack of time dedicated to providing depth for the characters or plot.
