= Price Hill, West Virginia =

Price Hill, West Virginia may refer to:

- Price Hill, Boone County, West Virginia, an unincorporated community in Boone County
- Price Hill, Fayette County, West Virginia, an unincorporated community in Fayette and Raleigh counties
- Price Hill, Monongalia County, West Virginia, an unincorporated community in Monongalia County
