= Price (given name) =

Price is a male given name which may refer to:

- Price Cobb (born 1954), American racecar driver
- Price Daniel (1910–1988), US Senator and 38th Governor of Texas
- Price Daniel Jr. (1941–1981), American politician, Speaker of the Texas House of Representatives from 1973 to 1975
- Price Ellison (1852–1932), English-born Canadian politician
- Price Hartstonge (1692–1743), Anglo-Irish politician who sat in the Irish House of Commons
