= Justice Price =

Justice Price may refer to:

- Dale Price (1924–1997), associate justice of the Arkansas Supreme Court
- J. H. Price (c. 1862–1947), associate justice of the Supreme Court of Mississippi
- James Latimer Price (1840–1912), associate justice of the Supreme Court of Ohio
- Robert Price (judge) (1653–1733), justice of the Court of Common Pleas of England
- Robert T. Price (1903–1982), associate justice of the Kansas Supreme Court
- William Ray Price Jr. (born 1952), associate justice of the Supreme Court of Missouri

== See also ==
- Price Daniel (1910–1988), justice of the Texas Supreme Court
