= The Price (The Last of Us) =

- The Last of Us episode
- Joel shows Ellie an Apollo command module. The scene was written and filmed to match the game's version, particularly its lighting. Critics praised its warmth and emotion.
- Episode no.: Season 2 Episode 6
- Directed by: Neil Druckmann
- Written by: Neil Druckmann; Halley Gross; Craig Mazin
- Cinematography by: Ksenia Sereda
- Editing by: Simon Smith
- Original air date: May 18, 2025
- Running time: 60 minutes

Guest appearances
- Rutina Wesley as Maria; Robert John Burke as Seth; Tony Dalton as Javier Miller; Joe Pantoliano as Eugene Lynden; Catherine O'Hara as Gail

Episode chronology
← Previous "Feel Her Love"	Next → "Convergence"
- The Last of Us season 2

"The Price" is the sixth episode of the second season of the American post-apocalyptic drama television series The Last of Us. Directed by series co-creator Neil Druckmann, who co-wrote it with Halley Gross and Craig Mazin, it aired on HBO on May 18, 2025. The episode follows Joel (Pedro Pascal) and Ellie (Bella Ramsey) over several years in Jackson, Wyoming, as they celebrate Ellie's birthdays and she grows suspicious of Joel's lie, especially after they encounter an infected Eugene Lynden (Joe Pantoliano).

The episode was the second to be directed by Druckmann, who had also co-directed and co-wrote The Last of Us Part II (2020), the video game on which the second season is based. He appreciated the episode's focus on drama more than action and was nervous about revisiting scenes that were important to him. Some scenes are adapted directly from the video game but in a different order; the episode consists of several flashbacks in succession, contrasting with their disparate structure in the game.

Critics considered the episode the season's best, praising Druckmann's direction, the writing, and Pascal and Ramsey's chemistry and performances. It received several awards nominations; at the 77th Primetime Emmy Awards, Pascal submitted the episode to support his nomination for Lead Actor in a Drama Series and Pantoliano was nominated for Guest Actor. The episode had 701,000 viewers on linear television and was among the most-watched across all streaming services for the week.

== Plot ==
In 1983, young Joel and Tommy live in fear of their abusive father, Javier; after Tommy was ripped off while buying marijuana, Joel instigated a fight, and the two ran into trouble. Javier does not beat them and instead gives Joel a beer, revealing he was abused more violently by his own father as a child. Expressing guilt about his own abusive behavior, Javier says that he hopes Joel will likewise be better with his own children.

Two months after arriving in Jackson, Wyoming, Ellie burns her arm to cover her bite. For her fifteenth birthday, Joel gifts her a cake and a custom-made guitar. Ellie asks him to perform a song, and he sings "Future Days". A year later, for her sixteenth birthday, Joel takes Ellie to an abandoned museum, where she climbs a dinosaur statue. Sitting in the Apollo 15 module, she listens to a tape of the Apollo 11 liftoff and imagines herself traveling to space. On her seventeenth birthday, Joel stumbles into Ellie's room after she has smoked marijuana and been intimate with Kat, who has tattooed a moth on Ellie's arm. Ellie starts to move into the garage; they argue but Joel concedes, the distance between them growing.

On her nineteenth birthday, with Ellie's suspicions surrounding Joel's story about the Fireflies (Note: In "Look for the Light", Joel rescues Ellie from the Fireflies and lies that they were unable to find a cure for the infected.) growing, Joel lets her join him on patrol. They encounter Eugene, who has been bitten and begs Joel to let him see his wife Gail before he turns. Ellie convinces Joel to agree, and he promises her. As she collects their horses, Joel leads Eugene away before executing him, which Ellie stumbles upon. In Jackson, Joel lies to Gail, telling her Eugene killed himself, but Ellie, realizing he had lied to her about the Fireflies years earlier, angrily exposes his lies to a distraught Gail.

Following the New Year's party, (Note: Also depicted in "Future Days") Ellie joins Joel on his porch. She demands the truth of what happened with the Fireflies. Joel tearfully admits that he killed the Fireflies to save Ellie's life, preventing them from finding a cure. Enraged, Ellie says he selfishly took away her life's purpose. Joel admits he has no regrets because he loves her and tells her that he hopes she will do better with her own children. She says she does not think she can forgive him but is willing to try.

In 2029, after torturing Nora, (Note: As depicted in "Feel Her Love") Ellie returns to the theater.

== Production ==
=== Conception and writing ===
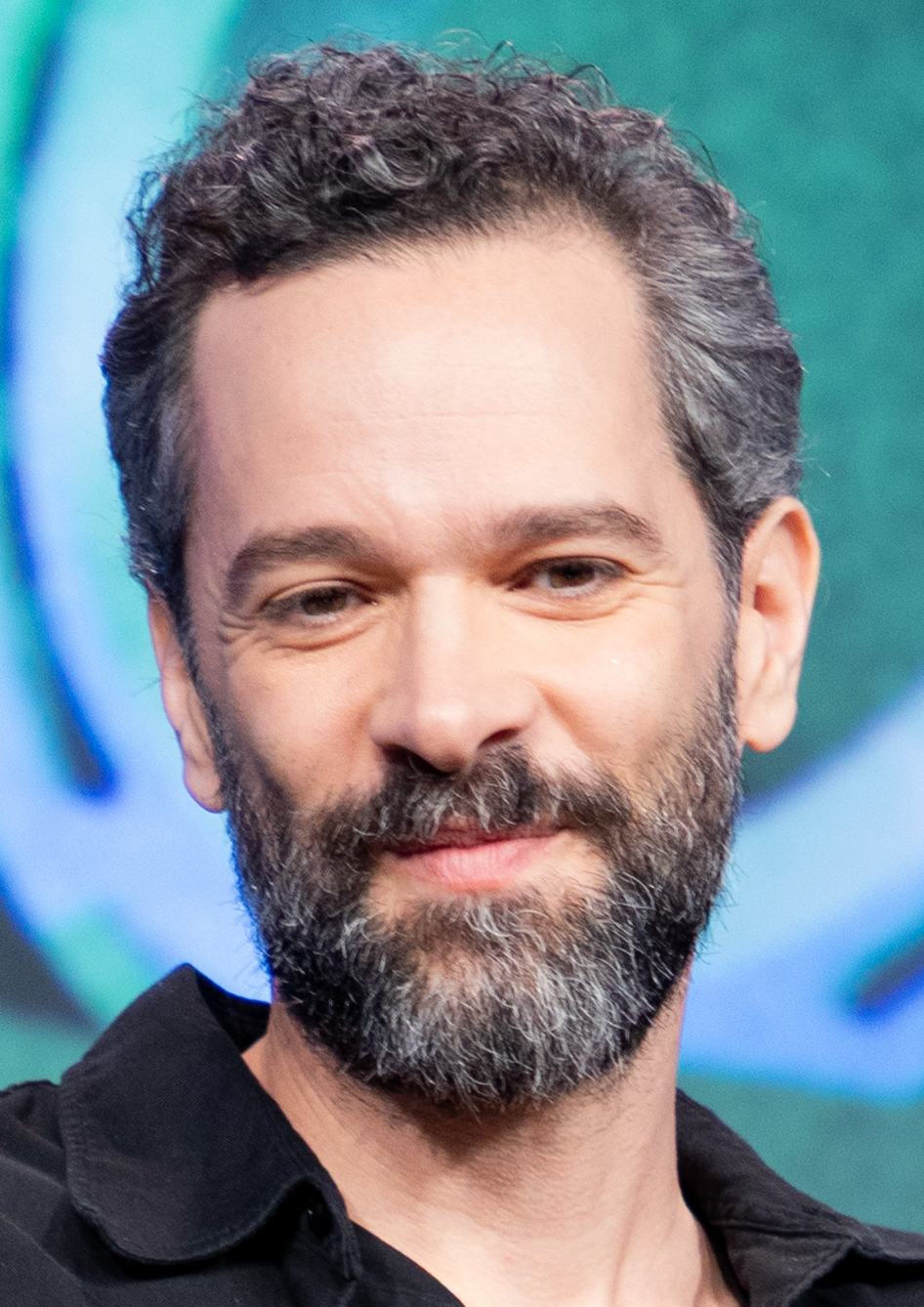
"The Price" was the second The Last of Us episode directed by co-creator Neil Druckmann.

"The Price" was directed by The Last of Us co-creator Neil Druckmann, who co-wrote it with Halley Gross and Craig Mazin. Druckmann co-directed The Last of Us Part II (2020), the video game on which the second season is based, and co-wrote it with Gross, who was announced as a series writer in July 2023 and co-executive producer in January 2025. She drafted the script with Druckmann before he became busy with his work at Naughty Dog, and primarily handled revisions with Mazin, who performed a final passthrough when finished with other scripts. Though he enjoyed writing independently, Mazin appreciated the unexpected ideas generated through collaboration.

Druckmann and Gross considered "The Price" a bottle episode following "the best moments" of Joel and Ellie's relationship. A scene in which they place hats on dinosaurs in the museum (also featured in the game) was cut from the episode due to pacing. Mazin felt adapting some scenes from the game directly—such as the space capsule sequence—was necessary as the game already featured the best version. Druckmann had showed him the scene during the game's development, amidst pre-production for the first season; Mazin declared he would adapt the scene directly when the time came. Gross found the linear experience of writing for television allowed a better, deeper focus on some scenes.

Having enjoyed directing an episode of the first season, Druckmann wanted to return for the second. He felt more confident returning, citing his familiarity with the process and actors. Druckmann had not originally intended to direct "The Price" due to its scope and his limited time but felt drawn to it after conversations with Mazin, Gross, and Pedro Pascal, who portrays Joel. Pascal had wanted to work with Druckmann again, particularly on his final full episode, and Druckmann liked the idea of "doing one more deep dive". He wanted to work on an episode he co-wrote, and appreciated the focus on dramatic sequences in "The Price" instead of action, allowing him to "stretch [himself] as a director", in contrast to his first-season episode which was focused on action. He felt the episode "is what the story is all about". He was nervous about revisiting scenes considered important to him and fans but wanted to ensure he "did it justice".

Unlike the game, which depicts flashbacks across the narrative from Ellie's perspective, "The Price" shows them in succession, combines some, and partially follows Joel's viewpoint. Druckmann felt the consecutive presentation maintained emotional impact and prevented audience confusion. Later in the writing process, Mazin conceived the idea of setting most flashbacks on Ellie's birthdays to highlight Joel's thoughtfulness and track the passage of time. He designed the structure to act as a narrative "time bomb", giving the audience a clear sense of momentum as the story builds toward Ellie confronting Joel's lie. The writers chose the episode's placement towards the end of the season for two reasons: to ensure audiences missed Joel, as he was last seen in the second episode; and to show how far Ellie has come, having tortured Nora in the present day in the preceding episode, and remind audiences what the story is about. Druckmann also wanted to avoid the episodes becoming formulaic if each had a different flashback.

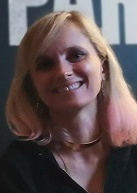
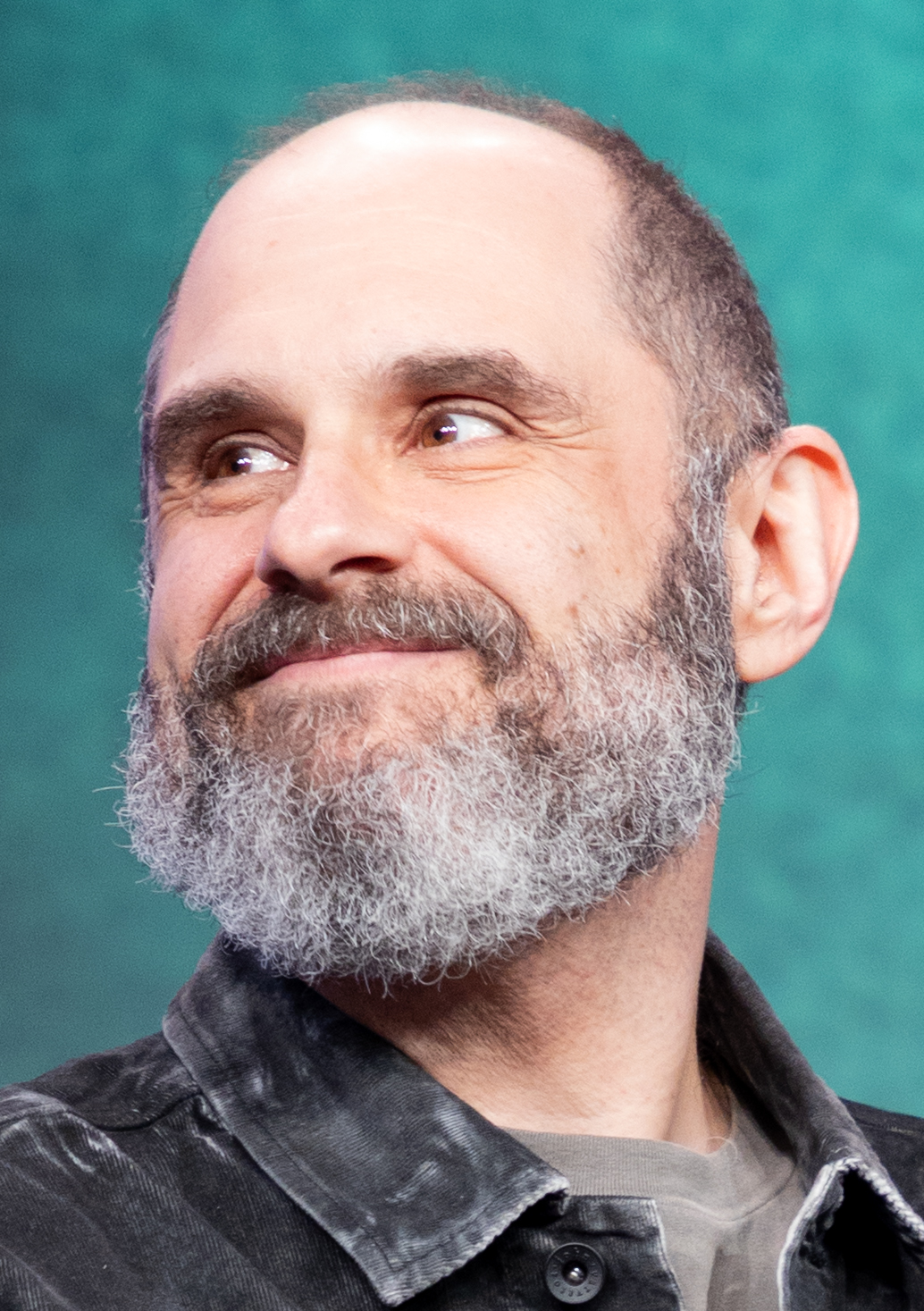
Druckmann co-wrote "The Price" with Halley Gross (left) and Craig Mazin (right).

The museum flashback in the game shows Ellie beginning to question Joel's lie; this was changed in the episode as it was addressed sufficiently in later flashbacks and the writers wanted to avoid "hit[ting] the same beat over and over again". A flashback in the game depicts Ellie revisiting the hospital in Salt Lake City; the writers found it less compelling and realistic due to the series's more dangerous world, instead replacing it with Eugene's scenes after several iterations. They struggled with Eugene's scenes, each attempting different versions with varying levels of action; Gross found the character's limited time meant "every line, every gesture has to count". The scene "fell into place" when they realized it should focus on Joel lying to Ellie and its impact on her. Mazin performed the final pass on the scene. Druckmann avoided showing violence in Eugene's death—even omitting the sound of the gunshot—as the point of the scene was Joel's lie; he instead tried to "make that moment as beautiful as possible".

While Ellie discovers evidence of Joel's lie in the game and forces him to confess in Salt Lake City, she lacks definitive proof in the series and forces his confession on his porch. Gross felt the series provided an opportunity to address both flashbacks simultaneously by combining them, calling the scene "the period at the end of the sentence" in Ellie comprehending Joel's lie. The porch scene is depicted towards the end of Part II; the writers moved it earlier in the series as they felt the gap between seasons would have lessened its impact, particularly in light of the narrative setups for the scene in the second-season premiere. They wanted the audience to understand Ellie's emotions and her knowledge of Joel's actions before continuing her present-day storyline in Seattle. The writers started with the porch scene as the episode's climax and wrote the other flashbacks to build up to it. For each flashback, they mapped the characters' emotions, showing smaller problems—such as Ellie burning her hand and smoking marijuana—before focusing on the real problem of Joel's lies; he tries to give Ellie everything she wants, but it is useless as it avoids the true reason for their friction.

The episode features Pearl Jam's song "Future Days", which recurs throughout the game and is briefly sung by Ellie in the preceding episode. The song did not exist in 2003, when the outbreak takes place in the television series; Druckmann initially sought to honor the changed timeline and exclude the song, and they chose several alternatives. However, as filming neared, the writers chose to use "Future Days" instead, considering its emotional connection more important than historical accuracy. In the episode, Gail is reading George R. Stewart's novel Earth Abides (1949), which was used for research during the development of The Last of Us (2013); its protagonist inspired the name of the unseen character Ish in the game. Costume designer Ann Foley found "The Price" to be the season's most difficult episode. She ensured Ellie's outfits became darker as she aged to show the advancement of time, with increasing plaid to mirror Joel. She felt the baggier shirt at the museum made Ellie's "silhouette feel more like a child", whereas the character in the game wore a tank top. Foley cried while reading the script and watching the episode, a first for her.

=== Casting and characters ===
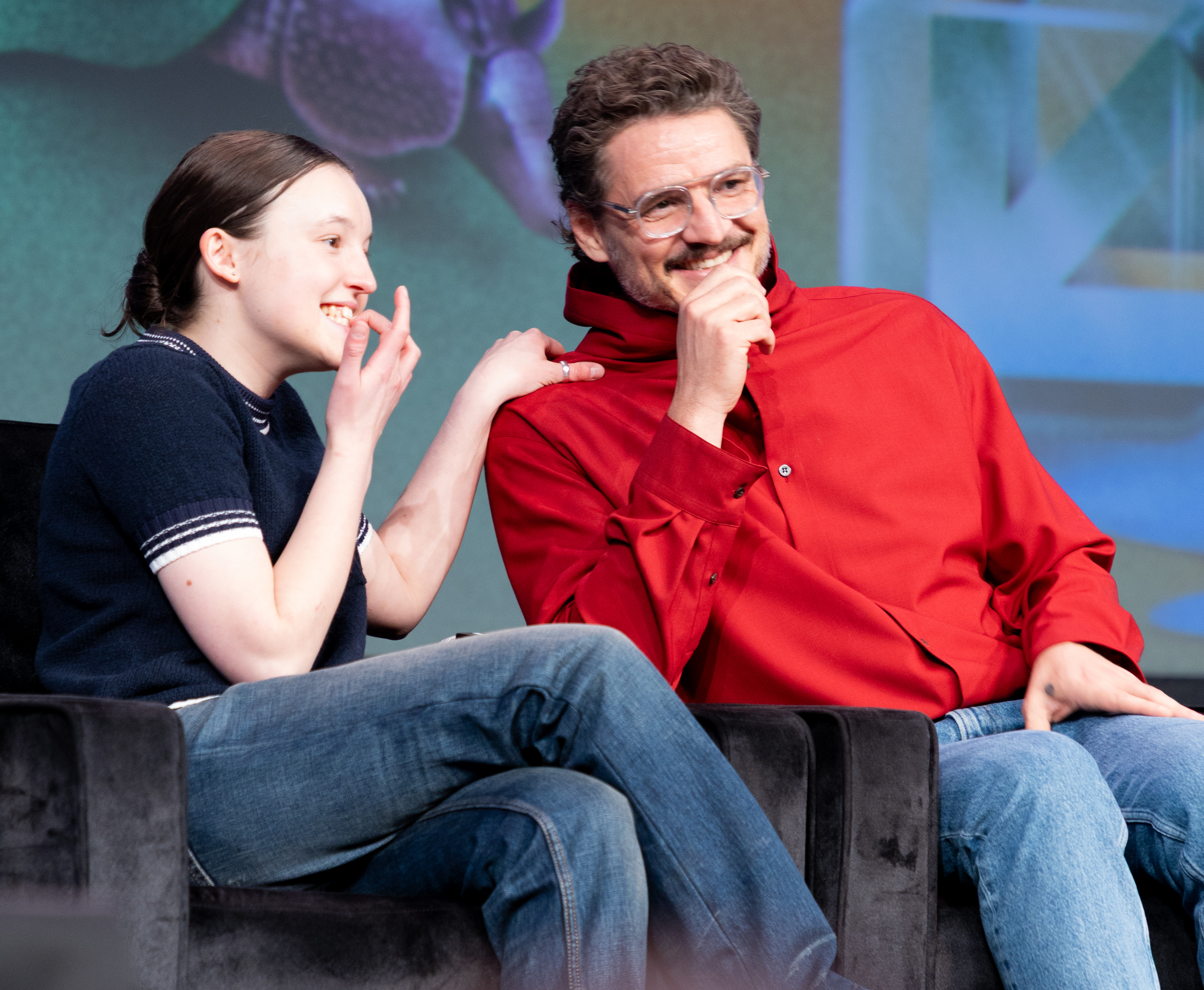
Bella Ramsey (left) helped Pedro Pascal (right) play guitar while filming the episode.

"The Price" marked Pascal's first full appearance in the series since "Through the Valley"; Bella Ramsey (who portrays Ellie) enjoyed having him back on set after an extended absence. According to Druckmann, Pascal's limited musical experience made him nervous about playing guitar as he wanted to "do [the] moment justice". He prepared with a vocal coach over the weekend before filming, seeking a Johnny Cash-style performance distinct from Troy Baker's in the game, and he wore an in-ear monitor during some shots to stay focused. Ramsey, who helped Pascal find the correct notes during filming, found the scene emotional and endearing, heightened by Pascal's focus and inexperience. Mazin felt the scene mirrored Ellie's performance to Dina in "Day One", considering it more of an expression of truth than a performance. Ramsey said it "means the world" to Ellie that Joel took an interest in something she loved in the museum sequence. They were relieved to portray a lighter version of Ellie again, considering the episode "a mental break, a physical break", as if they "went to a different show for a month and then came back". Andrew Diaz portrays young Joel in the opening flashback. He had previously worked with Pascal on We Can Be Heroes (2020), unbeknownst to Druckmann; they sought a good actor who resembled Pascal.

Druckmann preferred to "stand back and watch" the actors, opting to let them perform without too much direction. An exception was the porch scene, for which he informed Pascal of the episode's opening scene of Joel and his father, for which he was not present during production. Druckmann did not review the game's version of the porch scene before filming as he did not wish to replicate it; when he noticed Pascal making different decisions as Joel than Baker did in the game, he "had to fight certain instincts to try to replicate that", wanting it to remain Pascal's own version. Pascal had left the series after the second episode but returned for "The Price", for which he cleared his schedule. He was emotional during filming, particularly towards the end of production; he spent some time on set afterwards talking to Druckmann and the crew. Mazin recalled that Pascal and Ramsey naturally performed "in a very real, cool way", prompting him to seek "one magical take" where they act with full emotions in the porch scene. Druckmann cried while filming the porch scene, and noticed others on set doing the same. Ramsey found it "the most emotionally raw and intimate scene that [they had] ever been a part of", considering it was "maybe the most honest moment in the whole series" and recalling they felt "nothing else existed" while filming besides Pascal. The actors rehearsed the scene as usual but did not discuss it before filming as it felt natural.

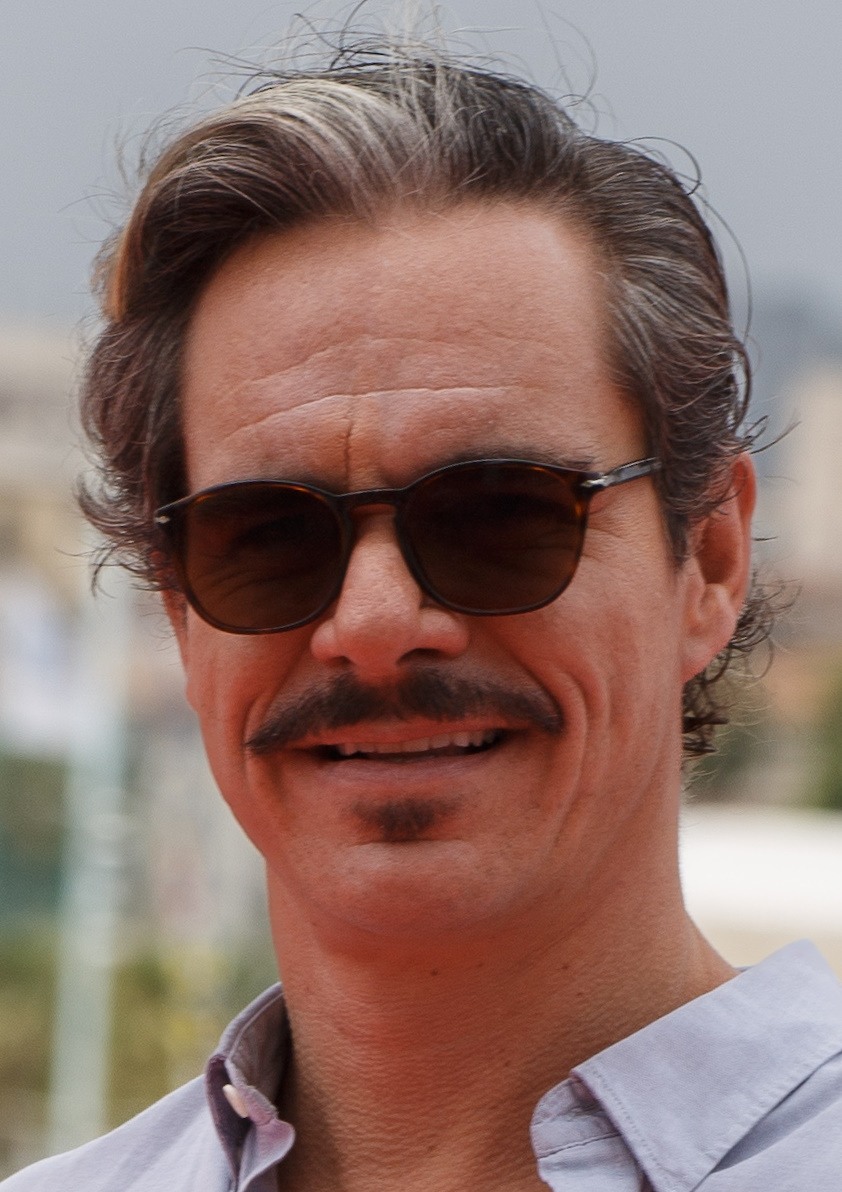
Tony Dalton was cast as Javier Miller, Joel and Tommy's father.

Tony Dalton portrays Javier Miller, Joel and Tommy's father. Druckmann pictured Dalton in the role while writing the scene, having enjoyed his role in Better Call Saul and met him at the Emmy Awards. He and Mazin pitched it to him over Zoom and Dalton was immediately enthusiastic. After working on The Last of Us, Dalton was cast in Naughty Dog's video game Intergalactic: The Heretic Prophet, co-directed by Druckmann. Javier wears the same watch later owned by Joel, an addition suggested by Gross, which the writers felt represented the passing of a parent's "programming" to their child. Early versions of the scenes included a more violent Javier, but the writers found it interesting to show him as complicated and depict his camaraderie with Joel, admonishing his actions while endorsing the reasoning behind them: protecting his family. Some early versions depicted Tommy's drug deal, but the writers felt the conversation was more important.

The writers wanted Javier's scenes to demonstrate that one's behavior is often reflective of their parents, using the character to capture "both the negatives and the positives of the power of parenting" and his lifelong impact on Joel. As the scene was developed, Druckmann felt it was about "not only generational trauma, but generational repair and hope", comparing it to himself attempting to fix the mistakes of his own parents while making new mistakes in the process. Gross considered the scene a framing device that establishes Joel's behavior later in the episode: he reacts impulsively, like his father, before consciously slowing down and treating Ellie more respectfully. Mazin felt it demonstrated the progression of morals, feeling parents are kinder to children than in the preceding generation. When Joel repeats Javier's hopes to Ellie on the porch, Mazin wanted it to plant a "tiny thread" in Ellie's mind that she is capable of goodness despite any bad actions she performs.

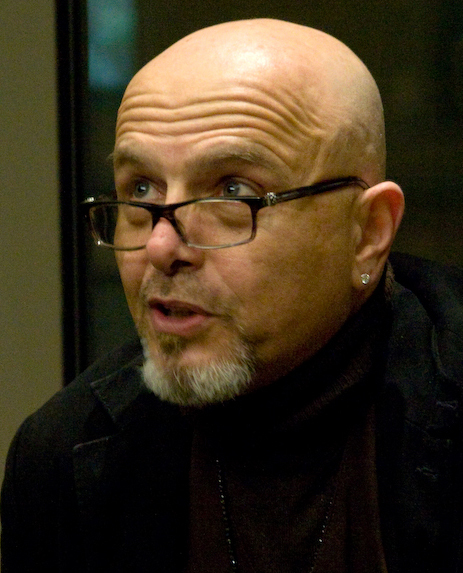
Joe Pantoliano portrays Eugene Lynden.

Eugene is only seen in a photograph in The Last of Us Part II, when Ellie and Dina find his abandoned cannabis den. The writers foregrounded Eugene's role akin to Bill and Frank's standalone episode, "Long, Long Time", in the first season; Druckmann felt the character's role in the game was "somewhat superficial" while his role in the series relates more closely to Joel and Ellie's relationship. Mazin found the use of existing characters to fulfill specific roles in the series appealing, like connecting Eugene to the protagonists, and allowing them to weave Gail into the existing narrative in her ties to Joel. Eugene's character was partly adapted from Esther, a deleted character from the game with whom Joel had a romantic connection; he would have been forced to kill her after she was bitten. Mazin and Druckmann did not have a specific actor in mind to portray Eugene until their casting director presented a list that included Joe Pantoliano; they felt he was the logical choice. When told about the role, Pantoliano originally thought it was for the series This Is Us, on which his friend Ken Olin was an executive producer. Pascal and Pantoliano had worked together about 20 years earlier for a reading of Gizmo Love in New York, but the latter had forgotten until Pascal reminded him. His casting as Eugene was announced on March 5, 2025.

At Druckmann's request, Eugene's glasses are cracked in the shape of a lambda, a reference to the logo of the video game series Half-Life. Pantoliano was cast later in production, prompting Druckmann to avoid placing him alongside Ellie's poster of The Matrix (1999), in which Pantoliano stars. In the script, Eugene's scenes had more humor but Druckmann found it inappropriate after seeing Pantoliano's performance; he was surprised by the actor's versatility, adding "an innocence and a purity" to the role, acting more like a child as he gets closer to death. Pantoliano considered the role "the most challenging work [he has] had in a long time" due to the character's limited role and desperation. He was drawn to the "human element" of the character, aware that similar events could occur to anyone: "People die, and see their life in a blink of an eye". When filming, Pantoliano recalled things he was unable to tell his mother when she died. Druckmann thought Eugene's eye twitch before dying made the scene more emotional and believable. The scene wherein Gail slaps Joel originally lacked dialogue, but Druckmann found the moment "felt artificial" during filming. He asked Catherine O'Hara (who portrays Gail) to yell at Pascal in one take; instead, she quietly sobbed and begged him to leave, which Druckmann found "so much better than what [he] asked for". With Pascal's approval, O'Hara slapped him in the face in one take—used in the episode—to avoid the comical appearance of a fake slap. Mazin felt Ellie revealed Joel's lie to Gail to punish Joel, not to make Gail feel bad. The writers decided not to feature Eugene and Gail together to underline their tragedy.

=== Filming ===
Production on the episode began around May 2024, and was completed by July 9. Like the rest of the season, it was filmed in Vancouver. The series's lead director of photography, Ksenia Sereda, worked on the episode. Druckmann felt he had developed "a shorthand" with Sereda after their work on the first season. They ensured each flashback had a unique style to make them stand out from each other, beginning with warmer tones and shifting in dynamic. The cold open was lit with warmth but the characters were compositionally separated to add an unsettling, isolating feeling. For Eugene's death, the production team began to prepare a location at Mystery Lake near Mount Seymour, Vancouver, for more than a month, breaking the ice and building a road to transport people and equipment. When filming was set to begin after the ice melted, the area was beset by "a Biblical level of bugs" inhaled by the crew, requiring protective clothing. The team built a set at a nearby location and the background was created with visual effects. Filming took place on a different day, by which time Pantoliano had become sick with the flu. Pascal's scenes were filmed, and Pantoliano filmed with a photo double later. Sereda's favorite lighting in the episode—the scene wherein Joel telling Gail about Eugene's death—was lit akin to a blue hour with touches of pink to reflect its sadness.

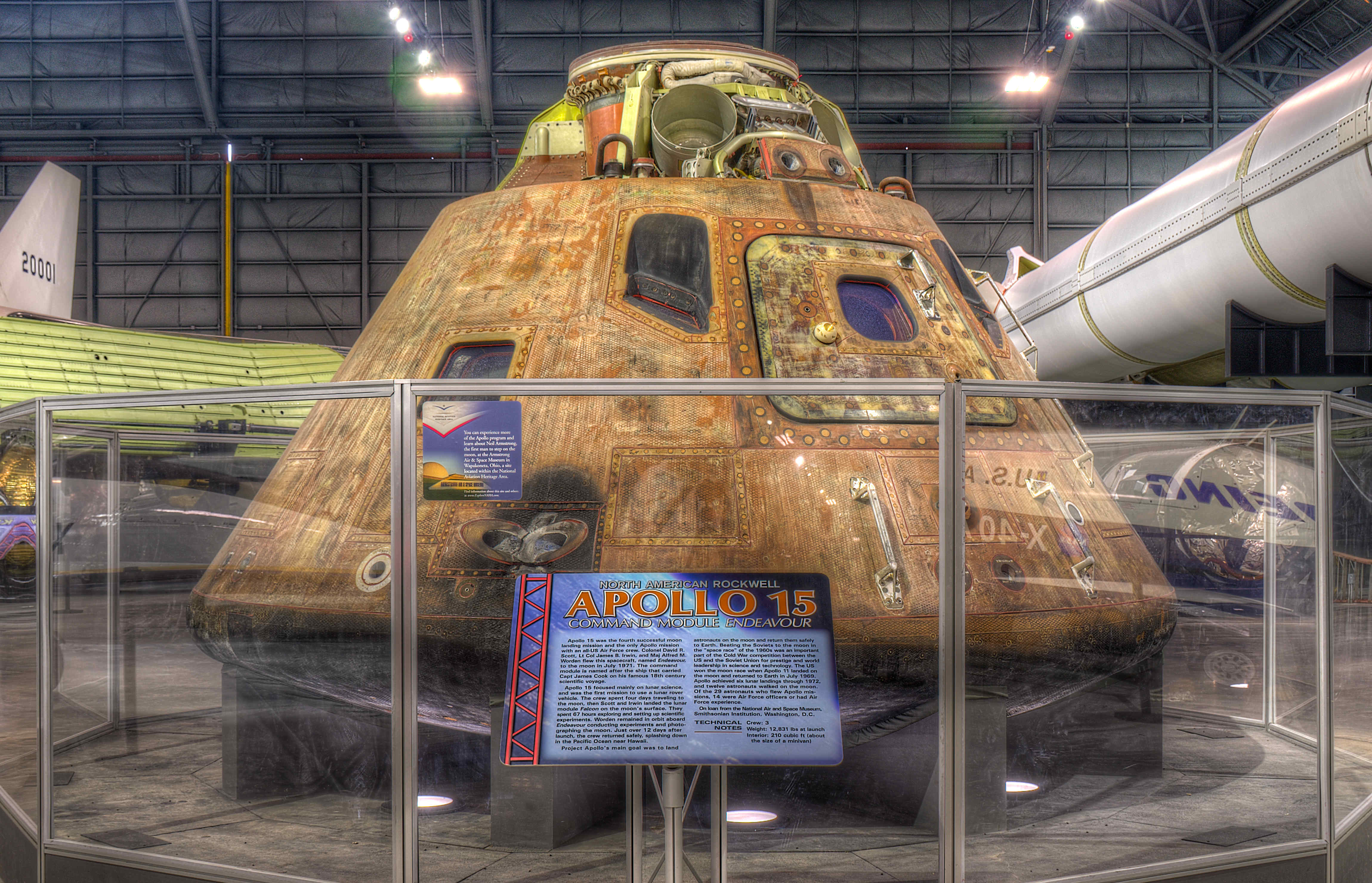
A replica of Apollo 15's command module was constructed for the episode.

Production designer Don Macaulay and his team constructed the Apollo command module for the episode, slightly increasing its size from the original design. They started with a small 3D-printed model to determine the appropriate removable pieces before increasing to a full-size foam version. Sereda used the model to prepare the scene's blocking and took it with her when discussing the sequence. Macaulay referenced NASA's diagrams and drawings of the module while trying to match its appearance from the game. He specifically created the set with the game's lighting in mind. The models were finalized shortly before filming, including painting and greenery, with Druckmann and Sereda providing final touches. Arne Meyer and Alison Mori—Naughty Dog's head of communication and studio manager, respectively—visited the set during filming and cried when seeing the space capsule, having spent years working on the game. The capsule's interior was built on a different set, requiring removable walls to fit the cameras and crew. Macaulay found the interior details—like the chairs, lights, and panels—time-consuming to source but quick to assemble. LED screens were tested for lighting the interior, but ultimately blue screens were used.

Sereda compared the episode to a dream sequence, particularly the space capsule scene with its cool lighting; she wanted it to reflect the "magical realism" of Ellie's memories while maintaining realistic lighting. Druckmann and Sereda spent a lot of time preparing for the scene, with three major rehearsals in different models of the capsule; Druckmann considered it demonstrative of the pre-production required for television, in contrast to video games, where changes can be made after recording. Sereda was stressed about the scene due to its variables and its reliability on specific crew members. The interior shots were technically complex, requiring two camera crews on cranes for lighting and hydraulics for movement; Druckmann called it "like a dance choreography", meeting with Sereda every few days to discuss different elements of the scene. Sereda had started working on the sequence first, using the game's version as inspiration for the lighting as she felt it was already effective; she also referenced launch sequences from films like First Man (2018). She was energized by the crew's enthusiasm for the scene and its game version; they referenced the game's music to match the timing of the sequence. The timing was mismatched for several takes before working as planned. Sereda found the sequence's simplicity effective, wanting to change little from the game's version. Druckmann did not want to imitate the game, encouraging Sereda to capture different shots, such as the profile of Ellie showing her joy and the refracting light, adding a layer of realism; Druckmann considered it "such a beautifully composed shot". He similarly noticed the tear on Joel's cheek, the spontaneity of which cannot be captured in a game; he and editor Simon Smith immediately wanted to include the take in the episode. Druckmann found the reaction—crying upon making one's child happy—relatable as a parent. Ramsey visualized themself going to space while filming.

Macaulay recreated an accurate, working orrery from the game, though he was unfamiliar with them beforehand; he had worked as the art director on several science fiction films, like Tomorrowland (2015) and Star Trek Beyond (2016), but the episode was his first based around real astronomy and space exploration. He and his team created a dinosaur museum (featuring six or seven dinosaur skeletons), lunar rover, model of the Moon, and rocket display, but none were featured in the final episode. The Tyrannosaurus model was acquired from China; Druckmann and Sereda climbed it, just as Ellie does in the episode; Ramsey wore a protective harness as they climbed the model. The museum hallway was lined with black velvet and lit with rhinestones and other fake diamonds bought from a dollar store by one of the art directors, who brought them to a lighting test. Sereda considered the scene difficult to film due to the lighting, requiring at least five iterations, including wetting the floor to capture the flashlights' reflections, which was unsuccessful. Ramsey found the darkness immersive, calling it "the time that [they] felt least like [they were] on a set".

Druckmann and Sereda visited the set about a week before filming to determine where to film Joel playing guitar; they found the kitchen table silhouetted the characters beautifully. For Joel and Ellie's argument after he catches her with Kat, Druckmann tried several approaches of the actors at different levels of anger before finding an effective middle ground. When Ramsey performed a take with Ellie's back to Joel as he slams the door, Druckmann repositioned the scene's blocking to capture it, preferring to following the actors' natural responses rather than a prescriptive plan. The New Year's Eve party, originally featured in the second-season premiere, was restaged for "The Price" and filmed from Joel's perspective, which Druckmann compared to Back to the Future Part II (1989) refilming scenes from the original film. He had Mazin's original work from the premiere on a secondary monitor for comparison. Sereda found the lighting easy to replicate, having also worked on the premiere. A full day of production was dedicated to the porch scene. Druckmann and Sereda wanted it to feel warm, achieved through the glow of lighting from Joel's house. Joel's house was a real home in Langley, with a constructed porch and added snow for the episode.

== Reception ==
=== Broadcast and ratings ===
The episode aired on HBO on May 18, 2025. On linear television, the episode had 701,000 viewers, with a 0.16 ratings share. The series was the most-viewed across all streaming services for the following week, and the seventh-most-viewed for overall watch time, with 707 million minutes streamed on Max. It was among the most in-demand shows in Canada, with more than 48 times the average television demand the preceding week and more than 57 times the following week.

=== Critical response ===
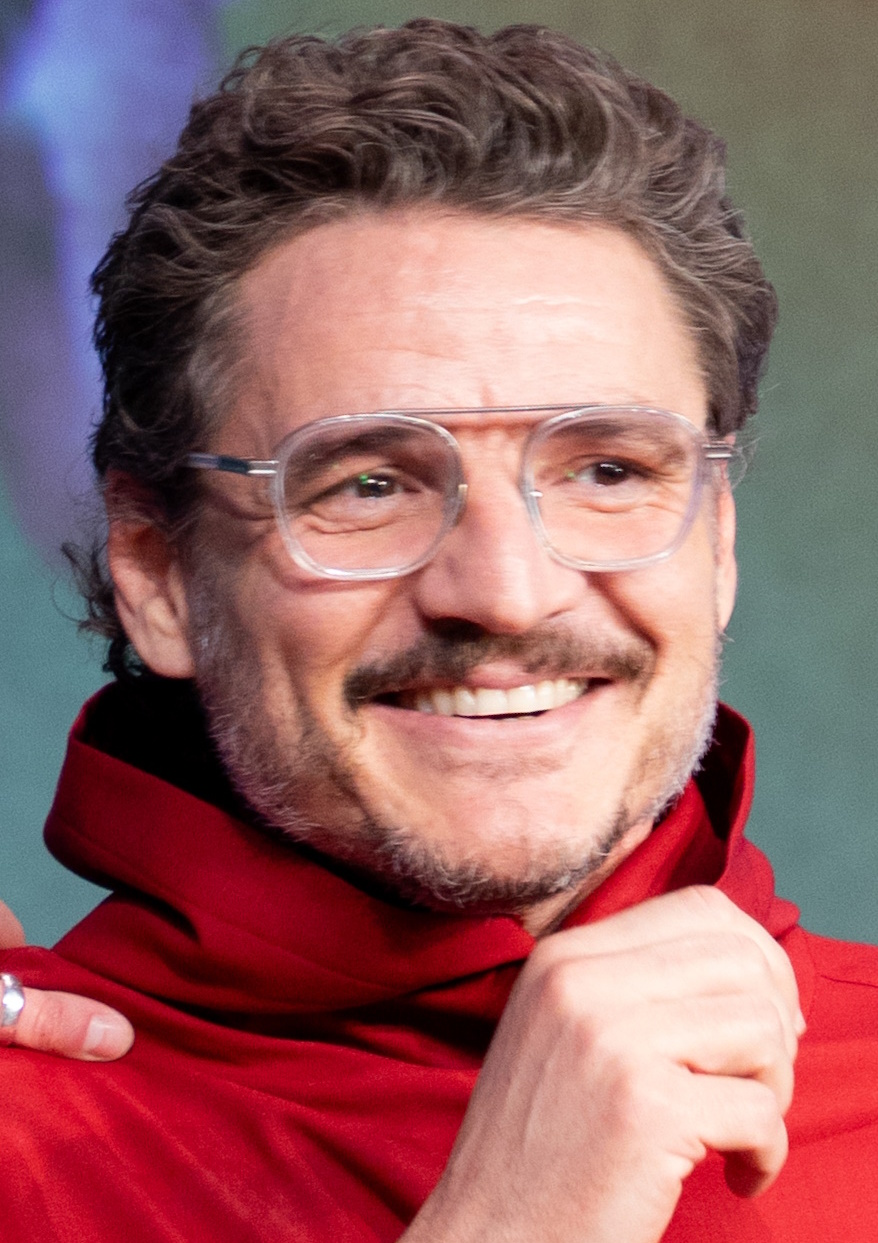
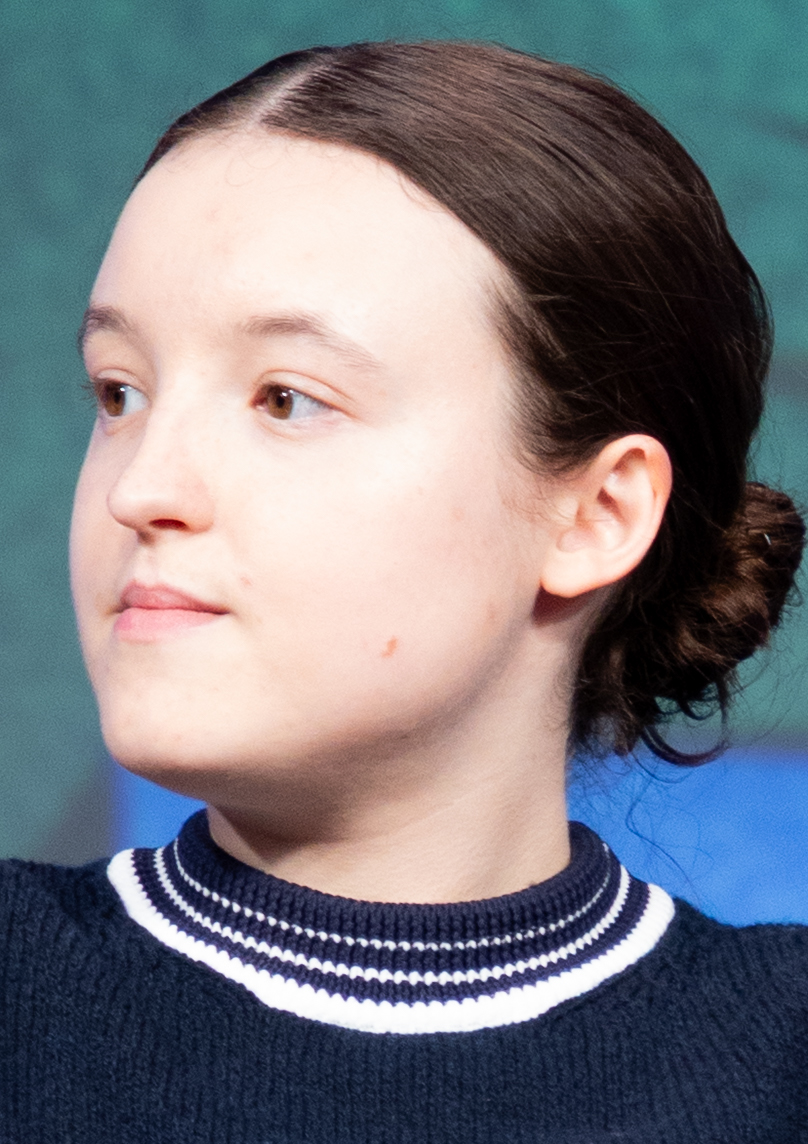
Critics praised the chemistry and performances of Pedro Pascal (left) and Bella Ramsey (right).

"The Price" has an approval rating of 100% on the review aggregator website Rotten Tomatoes based on 21 reviews, with an average rating of 8.6 out of 10. The website's critical consensus reads, "Pedro Pascal imbues Joel Miller with the essence of life itself, delivering a sobering and somber look at 'The Price' of fatherhood". Several reviewers considered it the season's best episode; many compared it to "Long, Long Time" in its themes, pacing, and quality. Collider's Ross Bonaime called it "a staggering hour of television, and arguably the most powerful and emotional episode of The Last of Us so far". Mashable's Belen Edwards felt its quality overshadowed the rest of the season, and Rolling Stone's Alan Sepinwall called it both the season's high point "and a repudiation of much of the rest of it". Druckmann's direction was praised; The Washington Post's Gene Park called it the season's "best shot, best paced and best written episode". It was nominated for the Humanitas Prize for Drama Teleplay, and for Outstanding Music Supervision (Note: Nominees: music supervisors Evyen Klean, Ian Broucek, and Scott Hanau) at the 77th Primetime Creative Arts Emmy Awards.

Critics praised Pascal and Ramsey's chemistry as one of the episode's strongest elements, described by Elle's Erica Gonzales as "Emmy-worthy" and by Esquire's Brady Langmann as possibly "their best performances of the entire series". BBC's Caryn James felt the episode demonstrated the series's reliance on their dynamic, and Rolling Stone's Sepinwall found it "hard not to wish that the show was still primarily about the two of them". Many considered Pascal the episode's standout, lauding his ability to demonstrate Joel's emotions with few words; CBR's Katie Doll called it "his best performance yet" and Kotaku's Shepard favorably compared his understated guitar performance to Baker's. TVLine's Kimberly Roots named Pascal the Performer of the Week for Joel's emotion and affection towards Ellie, and Pascal submitted the episode to support his Emmy nomination for Lead Actor in a Drama Series. Reviewers were impressed by Ramsey's ability to return to a younger, innocent, and excitable Ellie, particularly in contrast to the character's darker state in the preceding episode. Sepinwall complimented Ramsey's ability to demonstrate Ellie's betrayal on their face. Dalton was lauded for his simultaneous warmth and firmness, with many considering his casting as Pascal's father appropriate. Pantoliano was praised for his depth and understated nature despite his limited appearance; Shepard called it "one of the season's best", and he was nominated at the 5th Astra TV Awards and for Guest Actor in a Drama Series at the Emmy Awards.

The New York Times's Noel Murray compared the narrative to "Long, Long Time" but "in reverse", following the deterioration of Joel and Ellie's relationship in contrast to the growth of Bill and Frank's. The Independent's Nick Hilton praised the use of standalone episodes to effectively convey simple themes, claiming the series had "proven itself to be, perhaps, the great TV show about modern fatherhood". Some critics questioned the episode's placement within the season, finding it stalled momentum amid important narrative events. CBR's Katie Doll found the flashback scenes better than the game's version "by a long shot", and The Washington Post's Park called them "arguably better" in offering closure. The A.V. Club's Caroline Siede felt framing the episode around Ellie's birthdays "was a brilliant structural choice", and IGN's Simon Cardy appreciated the added depth to previous scenes, such as Seth and Joel's interactions and Ellie and Kat's relationship. The museum sequence—one of Siede's "favorite sequences of the show's entire run"—was praised for its warmth and emotion, and some critics appreciated the addition of Joel's lie about Eugene as a narrative technique, though Kotaku's Shepard considered it worse for avoiding addressing Joel's lie directly.

CBR's Doll appreciated the cold open's commentary on generational trauma and its added depth to Joel; conversely, Kotaku's Shepard considered it an uninspired attempt to soften the character and allow viewers to sympathize with him. IndieWire's Ben Travers found the porch scene powerful in its unexpected compassion, though Vanity Fair's Joshua Rivera thought it added confusion to Ellie's motivations. Collider's Bonaime felt combining the hospital and porch scenes made the latter more impactful; others found it rushed as it depicted Ellie discovering and accepting Joel's actions within the span of a few minutes. Shepard criticized the porch scene, finding the additional dialogue unnecessarily spelled out Joel's motivations in a condescending, unsubtle, and unnatural manner; he opined that the poor adaptation of the scene ruined the rest of the story, feeling the series "has already fumbled the landing before the story's even halfway over". He condemned Joel's initial homophobic response to Ellie and Kat's relationship, though Doll considered it realistic and reflective of his growth.
