= Price Township =

Price Township may refer to:

- Price Township, Rockingham County, North Carolina, in Rockingham County, North Carolina
- Price Township, Pennsylvania
