= The Price Is Right (disambiguation) =

The Price Is Right is an American game show that premiered in 1972.

The Price Is Right may also refer to:

- The Price Is Right (franchise)
  - The Price Is Right (1956 American game show)
  - The New Price Is Right (1994 game show)
  - The Price Is Right (Australian game show)
  - The Price Is Right (British game show)
  - The Price Is Right (Philippine game show)
  - The Price Is Right (franchise)#International versions

== See also ==
- The Price Is Right Live!, a traveling casino show
