= The Prize (album) =

Studio album by Prima Queen
- Released: 25 April 2025
- Genre: Indie pop
- Length: 37:09
- Label: Submarine Cat
- Producer: Steph Marziano

Prima Queen chronology
Not the Baby (2023)	The Prize (2025)

Singles from The Prize
- 1. "Fool" Released: 1 October 2024; 2. "Ugly" Released: 13 November 2024; 3. "The Prize" Released: 7 January 2025

The Prize is the debut studio album by British-American alternative rock duo Prima Queen, composed of Louise Macphail and Kristen McFadden. It was released on 25 April 2025, via Submarine Cat, in CD, LP and digital formats.

== Background ==
The Prize consists of twelve tracks ranging between two and three minutes each, apart from the intro track, whose length is under a minute. The total runtime of the album is approximately thirty-seven minutes. Its first single, "Fool", was released on 1 October 2024. It was followed by the second single, "Ugly", a month later on 13 November 2024, and the title-track third single on 7 January 2025. Noted as an album composed of indie pop songs, it was produced by Steph Marziano and succeeds the duo's 2023 EP, Not the Baby.

== Reception ==
Professional ratings
Review scores
Source	Rating
DIY	3.5/5 stars
Dork	4/5 stars
The Line of Best Fit	8/10 stars
MusicOMH	4/5 stars
Record Collector	3/5 stars

The Prize was described by Dork as "the culmination of two artists sure of their vision with an intent to turn every situation into a funny story, and it works delightfully well," and DIY as "a warm exploration of life's intimacies that places female friendship at the centre of this pair's universe." MusicOMH rated The Prize four stars and referred to it as "a collection of wry, witty indie-pop songs that seem to distil the best parts of Tegan and Sara, mix them up with a dash of Haim, a slather of Taylor Swift and then add their own special ingredient."

Christopher Hamilton-Peach of The Line of Best Fit assigned the album a rating of eight out of ten, stating "Prima Queen cement their emerging status with The Prize in a confident and unabashed manner, the self-awareness of reviewing the past through a forgiving lens, and a resignation to inaccuracy and flaws that finds expression in the final track's closing refrains." Record Collector's Chris Roberts gave the album a rating of three stars, stating "their connection and shared instinctive direction of travel is undeniable. Theirs is a sometimes hazy, sometimes pristine blend of guitars and harmonies which respects the succor of story-telling and implies empowerment without heavy-handedness," calling it a "promising debut."

== Track listing ==
The Prize track listing
No.	Title	Length
1.	"Clickbait (Intro)"	0:42
2.	"Mexico"	3:50
3.	"The Prize"	3:19
4.	"Oats (Ain't Gonna Beg)"	2:59
5.	"Ugly"	3:16
6.	"Flying Ant Day"	2:38
7.	"Meryl Streep"	3:51
8.	"Spaceship"	3:16
9.	"Fool"	3:41
10.	"Woman and Child"	3:23
11.	"Sunshine Song"	2:25
12.	"More Credit"	3:43
Total length:		37:09
