= The Prize (novel) =

1962 novel by Irving Wallace

First edition (publ. Simon & Schuster)

The Prize is a 1962 novel by American writer Irving Wallace concerning the annual prize-giving ceremony of the Nobel Prize. A film of the same name, based on the book and starring Paul Newman, was made later in 1963.

Six people all around the world are catapulted to international fame as they receive the most important telegraph of their lives, which invites them to Stockholm to receive the prize. This will be a turning point in their lives, in which personal affairs and political intrigue will engulf every one of the characters.
