= The Prize (1963 film) =

1963 film by Mark Robson

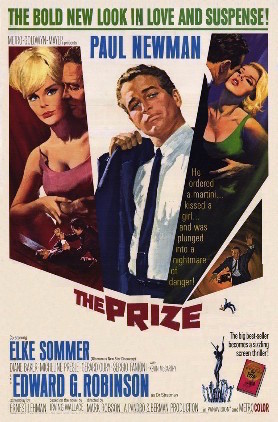
- film poster by Howard Terpning
- Directed by: Mark Robson
- Screenplay by: Ernest Lehman
- Based on: The Prize; 1962 novel by Irving Wallace
- Produced by: Pandro S. Berman
- Starring: Paul Newman; Edward G. Robinson; Elke Sommer
- Cinematography: William H. Daniels
- Music by: Jerry Goldsmith
- Distributed by: Metro-Goldwyn-Mayer
- Release dates: December 25, 1963 (USA); February 13, 1964 (UK)
- Running time: 134 minutes
- Country: United States
- Languages: English, Swedish
- Box office: est. US$3,500,000 (US/Canada)

The Prize is a 1963 American spy film and romantic comedy starring Paul Newman, Elke Sommer and Edward G. Robinson. It was directed by Mark Robson, produced by Pandro S. Berman and adapted for the screen by Ernest Lehman from the novel The Prize by Irving Wallace. It also features an early score by prolific composer Jerry Goldsmith.

== Plot ==
The Nobel Prize in Literature has been awarded to Andrew Craig, who is disrespectful of it, and seems more interested in women and drinking. Arriving in Stockholm for the award ceremony, he is delighted that Inger Lisa Andersson, whom he finds beautiful, has been assigned as his personal chaperone. At the hotel where all the winners are guests, Andrew is introduced to the physics laureate, Dr. Max Stratman, an elderly German-born American, who is accompanied by his niece Emily.

The Nobel laureates for medicine are Dr. John Garrett and Dr. Carlo Farelli. Garrett thinks Farelli must have stolen his work rather than reaching the same result through improvisation as he claimed, and thus does not deserve half the prize. The chemistry winners are a married couple, Drs. Denise and Claude Marceau. Claude Marceau's mistress, Monique Souvir, is traveling with them and Denise feels neglected as a woman; later she asks Andrew to help by pretending to have an affair.

That night, Max accepts an invitation to meet an old friend, Hans Eckhart, in a park. Eckhart asks him to publicly repudiate the U.S. and the prize, and defect to East Germany. When Max refuses, he is kidnapped by communist agents, while an impostor takes his place. Emily is told that the man is Walter, the father she thought was dead, and that he will be killed if she does not play along.

The next day, Andrew is surprised when "Max" does not remember meeting him, and his manner also seems different. But there is no time to talk: Andrew has an interview scheduled. Depressed and angry at himself, he tells the press the truth: far from still being a great literary talent, he has not even been able to start writing the much-anticipated novel he has been "working on" for years. He has been drinking heavily and supporting himself by writing pulp detective stories, and is accepting the prize only because of the money. Asked for an example of developing a detective story, he suggests the possibility that Max may be an impostor.

Andrew is telephoned by an Oscar Lindblom, who offers information about Max. He goes to Lindblom's apartment and finds the man dying. He sees and chases the assassin, whose name is Daranyi, but is thrown into a canal. A cursory police investigation, with Inger and Andrew there, finds no evidence of crime; they assume he imagined it while drunk. But Lindblom's widow says he was a makeup artist: exactly what an impostor would have needed.

Emily and Andrew follow a lead to a hospital where Max is being held, but he is whisked away before they find him. Emily leaves Andrew there without a car. On foot, he is attacked again by Daranyi and flees to a nudist lecture where he must remove his clothes. He gets away by disturbing the meeting until the police are called. They again assume he is drunk and return him to his hotel wearing only a towel. He has no key, but Denise Marceau lets him into her room—where she makes sure Claude sees him, producing the desired effect on Claude.

Inger has now seen enough to realize Andrew was right and has been acting admirably, and begins falling in love as she joins in his investigation. But the next day, Andrew is told she is being held hostage. Following clues Inger helped with, Andrew sneaks on board a docked German freighter soon to depart for Leningrad. Lindblom's body is there, and Inger is locked in with Max. Andrew manages to break them out, but at the hotel, Max collapses from the strain. Drs. Garrett and Farelli diagnose cardiac arrest or ventricular fibrillation. Farelli earns Garrett's admiration by improvising a crude defibrillator. Max is revived and dressed just in time to receive his prize.

When the impostor leaves the auditorium, Daranyi kills him; dying, he admits he is not Walter either, but an actor. Andrew chases Daranyi to the roof; Daranyi again attempts to kill Andrew but is shot by police and falls to his death, getting impaled on the Picasso. Andrew returns just in time to accept his own prize—and Inger's love.

== Cast ==
- Paul Newman as Andrew Craig
- Elke Sommer as Inger Lisa Andersson
- Edward G. Robinson as Dr. Max Stratman / Prof. Walter Stratman
- Diane Baker as Emily Stratman
- Micheline Presle as Dr. Denise Marceau
- Gérard Oury as Dr. Claude Marceau
- Sergio Fantoni as Dr. Carlo Farelli
- Kevin McCarthy as Dr. John Garrett
- Leo G. Carroll as Count Bertil Jacobsson
- Sacha Pitoëff as Daranyi, Dark Henchman
- Jacqueline Beer as Monique Souvir, Dr. Claude's secretary
- John Wengraf as Hans Eckhart
- Don Dubbins as Ivar Cramer, Light Henchman
- Virginia Christine as Mrs. Bergh, Chaperon
- Rudolph Anders as Mr. Rolfe Bergh, Chaperon
- Martine Bartlett as Saralee Garrett
- Karl Swenson as Hilding (Welcome Basket)
- John Qualen as Oscar (Welcome Basket)
- Ned Wever as Clark Wilson, U.S. Ambassador

== Production ==
Paul Newman gave an interview to the New York Times during production on The Prize, and he insisted that actors should not accept a movie just based on a novel's status as a bestseller. He spoke from experience, having been panned in a film he took because the novel was a hit. The adapted screenplay was far more important to Newman. He said that he had not read Irving Wallace's novel and probably would not until filming was finished. "When you start doing a movie after you have read the book, you find you often have to detach yourself from the novel. You have to work to blot out your original ideas about the character. My attitude toward the character I am acting must not be cluttered by what I read in the book."

Mark Robson had intended to film on location in the Grand Hôtel and the Stockholm Concert Hall, but as the popularity of Irving Wallace's novel grew, Swedes became wary of the production. Robson had to settle on sending a crew just to shoot exteriors of the locations. His other main concern was finding the right balance in the film, "The most dangerous thing in dealing with melodrama mixed with comedy is that the laughs may come at the wrong time...I have done comedy and I have done melodrama. But this is the first time I have had to worry about both in the same picture."

== Reception ==
Bosley Crowther, writing for the New York Times, dismissed the film as a farrago that is "all just a bit too garbled, illogical and wild." However, he conceded that "at least it's a fastmoving picture. Mark Robson, who directed, hasn't looked at a lot of old Alfred Hitchcock pictures, including 'The Lady Vanishes,' for naught."

Variety's review of the film writes that "The Prize is a suspense melodrama played for laughs. Trouble is the basic comedy approach clashes with the political-topical framework of the story." The review does commend Paul Newman's performance, writing that "[a]lthough limited as a comic actor and confronted here with a rather difficult and unsubstantial character to portray, Newman tackles his task with sufficient vivacity to keep an audience concerned for his welfare and amused by his antics," and writes of Edward G. Robinson that he "achieves a persuasive degree of contrast in his dual role." It concludes by saying that "Mark Robson's direction generates a lot of excitement, humor and suspense in spots, but this is offset by hokey elements, occasional exaggerations and stripping of dramatic gears as the film fluctuates between its incompatible components."

== See also ==
- List of American films of 1963
