= List of accolades received by The Last of Us (TV series) =

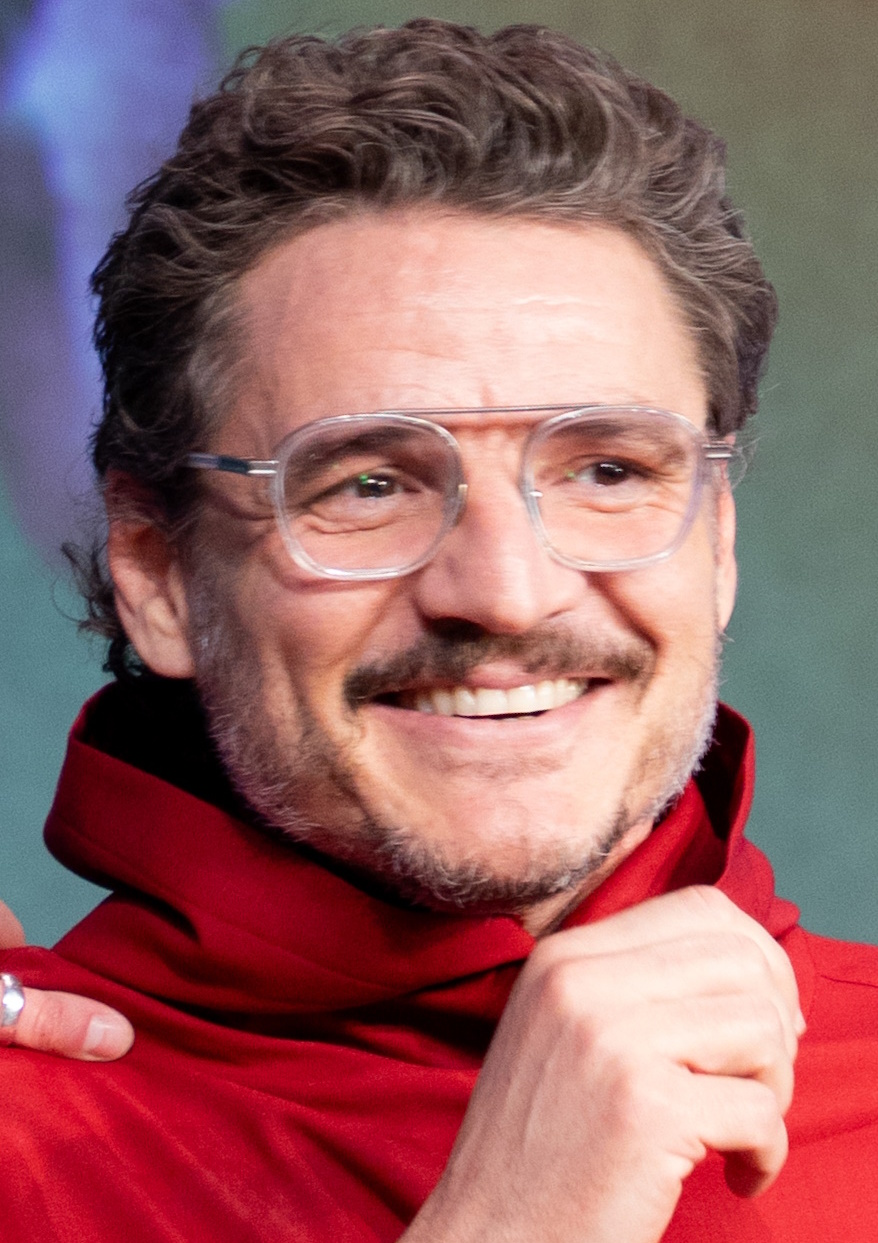
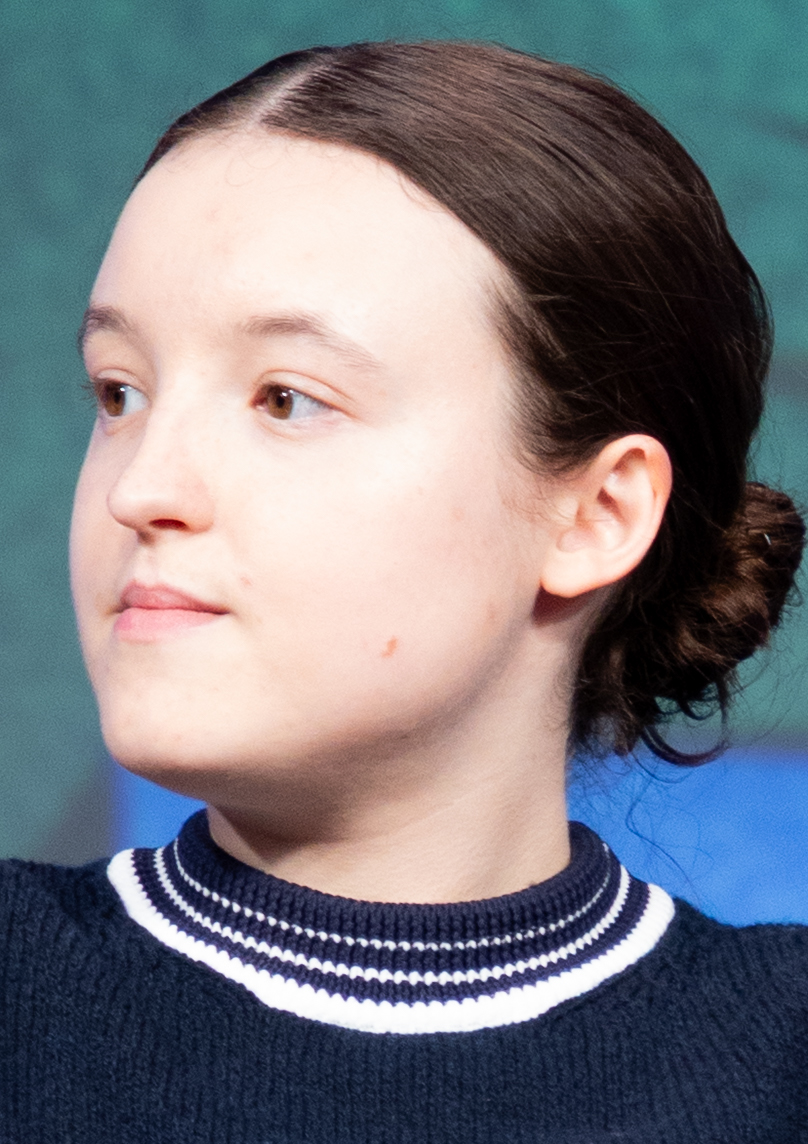
- Pedro Pascal and Bella Ramsey received the most acting nominations for The Last of Us.
Accolades
Award	Wins	Nominations
AACTA International Awards	0	3
AARP Movies for Grownups Awards	0	1
American Cinema Editors Awards	1	1
American Film Institute Awards	1	1
Art Directors Guild Awards	1	2
Artios Awards	1	2
ASCAP Screen Music Awards	1	1
Astra Creative Arts Awards	0	2
Astra Creative Arts TV Awards	1	6
Astra TV Awards	3	16
Australian Production Design Guild Awards	1	2
Black Reel Awards	1	6
BMI Film, TV & Visual Media Awards	2	2
British Academy Television Awards	0	4
British Academy Television Craft Awards	1	4
Celebration of Cinema and Television	1	1
Cinema Audio Society Awards	1	1
Clio Entertainment Awards	31	35
Costume Designers Guild Awards	0	1
Critics' Choice Super Awards	9	13
Critics' Choice Television Awards	0	4
Directors Guild of America Awards	1	1
Directors Guild of Canada Awards	1	1
Dorian Awards	1	13
Fangoria Chainsaw Awards	2	2
The Game Awards	2	2
GEMA Awards	3	5
GLAAD Media Awards	1	2
Golden Globe Awards	0	4
Golden Joystick Awards	0	1
Golden Reel Awards	1	5
Golden Trailer Awards	2	12
Gotham Awards	0	2
Hollywood Music in Media Awards	1	2
Hollywood Professional Association Awards	1	3
Hugo Awards	1	1
Humanitas Prize	1	2
Imagen Awards	5	7
Independent Spirit Awards	2	4
Location Managers Guild Awards	2	4
MacGuffin Awards	1	2
Make-Up Artists and Hair Stylists Guild Awards	1	3
MTV Millennial Awards	0	1
MTV Movie & TV Awards	3	6
NAACP Image Awards	0	1
NHMC Impact Awards Gala	1	1
Peabody Awards	1	1
People's Choice Awards	2	5
Primetime Creative Arts Emmy Awards	9	33
Primetime Emmy Awards	0	8
Producers Guild of America Awards	0	2
Rockie Awards	3	3
Royal Television Society Craft & Design Awards	1	1
Satellite Awards	1	6
Saturn Awards	1	6
Set Decorators Society of America Awards	1	2
SCL Awards	0	2
Screen Actors Guild Awards / Actor Awards	3	5
Television Critics Association Awards	0	6
UBCP/ACTRA Awards	1	2
USC Scripter Awards	0	1
Visual Effects Society Awards	5	10
Webby Awards	2	4
World Soundtrack Awards	0	2
Writers Guild of America Awards	1	2

Totals (Note: Certain award groups do not simply award one winner. They acknowledge several different recipients, have runners-up, and have third place. Since this is a specific recognition and is different from losing an award, runner-up mentions are considered wins in this award tally. For simplification and to avoid errors, each award in this list has been presumed to have had a prior nomination.)
- Wins: 120
- Nominations: 295

The Last of Us is an American post-apocalyptic drama television series created by Craig Mazin and Neil Druckmann for HBO and based on the video game franchise developed by Naughty Dog. It follows Joel (Pedro Pascal) and Ellie (Bella Ramsey), who travel across the United States in the first season, based on 2013's The Last of Us. In the second season, based on 2020's The Last of Us Part II, they have settled in Jackson, Wyoming, with Joel's brother Tommy (Gabriel Luna) and Ellie's friends Dina (Isabela Merced) and Jesse (Young Mazino). After Joel's death, the group travel to Seattle to track down his killer, Abby (Kaitlyn Dever), who is set to be the focus of the third season. Guest stars include Nick Offerman and Murray Bartlett as isolated survivalists Bill and Frank, Lamar Johnson and Keivonn Montreal Woodard as brothers Henry and Sam, Melanie Lynskey as resistance leader Kathleen, Storm Reid as Ellie's best friend Riley, Catherine O'Hara as Joel's therapist Gail, and Jeffrey Wright as militia leader Isaac.

The Last of Us premiered in January 2023, and the second season aired in 2025. It is the first live-action video game adaptation to receive major awards consideration. From major guilds, it won two awards at the Screen Actors Guild Awards and one each at the Directors and Writers Guild of America Awards, and received two nominations from the Producers Guild. It was nominated for six TCA Awards, four Critics' Choice Television Awards, four Golden Globe Awards, and four British Academy Television Awards, including Ramsey as the youngest-ever Leading Actress nominee. The series led the 1st Astra Creative Arts TV Awards with six nominations and the Visual Effects Society Awards's television categories with six nominations and four wins in 2024 and four nominations in 2026. In genre awards, it was nominated for six Saturn Awards and won a Hugo Award. It won a Peabody Award for Entertainment and earned the Ruderman Family Foundation's Seal of Authentic Representation for Woodard's role, while Ramsey was named a BAFTA Breakthrough in 2023.

The first season was nominated for 24 Primetime Emmy Awards, with a leading eight wins at the 75th Primetime Creative Arts Emmy Awards. Ramsey, who is non-binary, considered withdrawing due to the lack of non-gendered categories following Liv Hewson's withdrawal for Yellowjackets, but decided to contend for Lead Actress after discussions with Mazin, not wanting limited language to prevent celebrating non-binary performers; Ramsey's was the second non-binary acting nomination and the first for a leading role at time of nomination, (Note: Emma Corrin was nominated for Lead Actress in 2021 but did not publicly identify as non-binary at the time. Carl Clemons-Hopkins was the first openly non-binary acting nominee, nominated for Supporting Actor in a Comedy Series in 2021.) and the fourth-youngest in the category. Woodard was the second-youngest Emmy nominee, the youngest for Guest Actor in a Drama Series, and the first nominated Black deaf and second deaf actor, (Note: The youngest-ever Emmy nominee is Keshia Knight Pulliam, nominated in 1986 for The Cosby Show. The first Emmy-nominated deaf actor is Marlee Matlin, with four nominations.) while Pascal was the second Latino nominated for Lead Actor in a Drama Series and the first since 1999. The second season was nominated for 17 Emmy Awards. Pascal's limited second-season role prompted a decision between a lead or supporting actor submission, while Dever similarly had to decide between supporting and guest actress. Ramsey's nomination made them the first non-binary performer to receive a second nomination and the youngest two-time lead drama actress nominee, while Pascal became the second Latino nominated for lead drama actor more than once.

== Accolades ==
Accolades
Award	Date of ceremony	Category	Recipient(s) and nominee(s)	Result	Ref.
AACTA International Awards	February 10, 2024	Best Drama Series	The Last of Us	Nominated	
AACTA International Awards	February 10, 2024	Best Actor in a Series	Pedro Pascal	Nominated	
AACTA International Awards	February 10, 2024	Best Actress in a Series	Bella Ramsey	Nominated	
AARP Movies for Grownups Awards	January 10, 2026	Best Actor (TV)	Pedro Pascal	Nominated	
American Cinema Editors Awards	March 3, 2024	Best Edited Drama Series	Timothy A. Good (for "Long, Long Time")	Won	
American Film Institute Awards	December 7, 2023	Top 10 Television Programs	The Last of Us	Won (Note: This award does not have a single winner, but recognizes multiple programs.)	
Art Directors Guild Awards	February 10, 2024	Excellence in Production Design for a One-Hour Fantasy Single-Camera Series	John Paino (for "Infected")	Won	
Art Directors Guild Awards	February 28, 2026	Excellence in Production Design for a One-Hour Fantasy Single-Camera Series	Don Macaulay (for "Day One")	Nominated	
Artios Awards	March 7, 2024	Outstanding Achievement in Casting – Television Drama Pilot or First Season	Victoria Thomas, Corinne Clark, Jennifer Page, and Megan Bayliss	Won	
Artios Awards	February 26, 2026	Outstanding Achievement in Casting – Television Drama Series	Mary Vernieu, Lindsay Graham Ahanonu, Sydney Shircliff, Corinne Clark, Jennifer Page, and Megan Bayliss	Nominated	
ASCAP Screen Music Awards	May 9, 2024	Composers' Choice: Television Score of the Year	David Fleming	Won	
Astra Creative Arts Awards	December 11, 2025	Best Choreography	The Last of Us	Nominated	
Astra Creative Arts Awards	December 11, 2025	Best Sound	The Last of Us	Nominated	
Astra Creative Arts TV Awards	January 8, 2024	Best Short Form Series	The Last of Us: Inside the Episode	Nominated	
Astra Creative Arts TV Awards	January 8, 2024	Best Contemporary Costumes	The Last of Us	Nominated	
Astra Creative Arts TV Awards	January 8, 2024	Best Main Title Design	The Last of Us	Nominated	
Astra Creative Arts TV Awards	January 8, 2024	Best Guest Actor in a Drama Series	Nick Offerman	Won	
Astra Creative Arts TV Awards	January 8, 2024	Best Guest Actor in a Drama Series	Murray Bartlett	Nominated	
Astra Creative Arts TV Awards	January 8, 2024	Best Guest Actress in a Drama Series	Melanie Lynskey	Nominated	
Astra TV Awards	January 8, 2024	Best Cable Drama Series	The Last of Us	Nominated	
Astra TV Awards	January 8, 2024	Best Actor in a Broadcast Network or Cable Drama Series	Pedro Pascal	Won	
Astra TV Awards	January 8, 2024	Best Actress in a Broadcast Network or Cable Drama Series	Bella Ramsey	Nominated	
Astra TV Awards	June 10, 2025	Best Drama Series	The Last of Us	Nominated	
Astra TV Awards	June 10, 2025	Best Cast Ensemble in a Cable Drama Series	The Last of Us	Nominated	
Astra TV Awards	June 10, 2025	Best Actor in a Drama Series	Pedro Pascal	Nominated	
Astra TV Awards	June 10, 2025	Best Actress in a Drama Series	Bella Ramsey	Nominated	
Astra TV Awards	June 10, 2025	Best Supporting Actress in a Drama Series	Isabela Merced	Won	
Astra TV Awards	June 10, 2025	Best Writing in a Drama Series	Craig Mazin (for "Through the Valley")	Nominated	
Astra TV Awards	June 10, 2025	Best Directing in a Drama Series	Mark Mylod (for "Through the Valley")	Nominated	
Astra TV Awards	June 10, 2025	Best Guest Actor in a Drama Series	Danny Ramirez	Nominated	
Astra TV Awards	June 10, 2025	Best Guest Actor in a Drama Series	Joe Pantoliano	Nominated	
Astra TV Awards	June 10, 2025	Best Guest Actor in a Drama Series	Jeffrey Wright	Won	
Astra TV Awards	June 10, 2025	Best Guest Actress in a Drama Series	Kaitlyn Dever	Nominated	
Astra TV Awards	June 10, 2025	Best Guest Actress in a Drama Series	Catherine O'Hara	Nominated	
Astra TV Awards	June 10, 2025	Best Guest Actress in a Drama Series	Alanna Ubach	Nominated	
Australian Production Design Guild Awards	August 24, 2024	Art Direction for a Feature Film or Television Production	Callum Webster, John Paino, Kyle White, and Don Macaulay (for "Endure and Survive")	Nominated	
Australian Production Design Guild Awards	August 22, 2026	Art Direction for a Feature Film or Television Production	Callum Webster and Don Macaulay	Won	
Black Reel Awards	January 11, 2024	Outstanding Guest Performance in a Drama Series	Storm Reid	Won	
Black Reel Awards	January 11, 2024	Outstanding Guest Performance in a Drama Series	Lamar Johnson	Nominated	
Black Reel Awards	January 11, 2024	Outstanding Guest Performance in a Drama Series	Nico Parker	Nominated	
Black Reel Awards	January 11, 2024	Outstanding Guest Performance in a Drama Series	Keivonn Woodard	Nominated	
Black Reel Awards	August 18, 2025	Outstanding Guest Performance in a Drama Series	Tati Gabrielle	Nominated	
Black Reel Awards	August 18, 2025	Outstanding Guest Performance in a Drama Series	Jeffrey Wright	Nominated	
BMI Film, TV & Visual Media Awards	June 5, 2024	BMI Streaming Series Award	Gustavo Santaolalla	Won	
BMI Film, TV & Visual Media Awards	May 13, 2026	BMI Streaming Series Award	Gustavo Santaolalla	Won	
British Academy Television Awards	May 12, 2024	International	The Last of Us	Nominated	
British Academy Television Awards	May 12, 2024	Leading Actress	Bella Ramsey	Nominated	
British Academy Television Awards	May 12, 2024	Supporting Actress	Nico Parker	Nominated	
British Academy Television Awards	May 12, 2024	P&O Cruises Memorable Moment	Bill and Frank's story	Nominated	
British Academy Television Craft Awards	April 28, 2024	Director: Fiction	Peter Hoar	Won	
British Academy Television Craft Awards	April 28, 2024	Photography & Lighting: Fiction	Eben Bolter	Nominated	
British Academy Television Craft Awards	April 26, 2026	Editing: Fiction	Simon Smith	Nominated	
British Academy Television Craft Awards	April 26, 2026	Photography & Lighting: Fiction	Catherine Goldschmidt	Nominated	
Celebration of Cinema and Television	December 4, 2023	Rising Star – Television	Keivonn Woodard	Won	
Cinema Audio Society Awards	March 2, 2024	Outstanding Achievement in Sound Mixing for Television Series – One Hour	Michael Playfair, Marc Fishman, Kevin Roache, and Randy Wilson (for "When You're Lost in the Darkness")	Won	
Clio Entertainment Awards	November 9, 2023	Home Entertainment: Featurette	Home Entertainment Content Campaign	Silver	
Clio Entertainment Awards	November 9, 2023	Home Entertainment: Featurette	The Last of Us: Stranger than Fiction	Silver	
Clio Entertainment Awards	November 9, 2023	Television: Design	The Last of Us Main Title by Elastic	Bronze	
Clio Entertainment Awards	November 9, 2023	Television: Experiential / Events / Activation	Immersing Global Audiences in HBO's The Last of Us	Bronze	
Clio Entertainment Awards	November 9, 2023	Television: Fan Engagement	"The Infected Billboard" by Dentsu Creative	Silver	
Clio Entertainment Awards	November 9, 2023	Television: Fan Engagement	Endure and Socialize: HBO's The Last of Us	Bronze	
Clio Entertainment Awards	November 9, 2023	Television: Integrated Campaign	Game to Game-Changer: HBO's The Last of Us	Silver	
Clio Entertainment Awards	November 9, 2023	Television: Key Art	The Last of Us – International Key Art	Bronze	
Clio Entertainment Awards	November 9, 2023	Television: Key Art	Domestic Teaser	Bronze	
Clio Entertainment Awards	November 9, 2023	Television: Original Content	The Last of Us: Inside the Episode	Silver	
Clio Entertainment Awards	November 9, 2023	Television: Original Content	Making of The Last of Us	Bronze	
Clio Entertainment Awards	November 9, 2023	Television: Original Content	HBO's The Last of Us Podcast	Bronze	
Clio Entertainment Awards	November 9, 2023	Television: Out of Home	"The Infected Billboard" by Dentsu Creative	Won	
Clio Entertainment Awards	November 9, 2023	Television: Out of Home	The Last of Us mural by BLT Communications	Silver	
Clio Entertainment Awards	November 9, 2023	Television: Teaser	"Alone" by Level Up AV	Gold	
Clio Entertainment Awards	November 9, 2023	Television: Trailer	"West" by Create Advertising Group	Silver	
Clio Entertainment Awards	November 9, 2023	Television: Video Promo Campaign	The Last of Us Season 1	Silver	
Clio Entertainment Awards	November 9, 2023	Television: Video Promo Campaign	The Last of Us Campaign by Level Up AV	Silver	
Clio Entertainment Awards	November 9, 2023	Television: Video Promo Craft (Editing)	"Alone" by Level Up AV	Silver	
Clio Entertainment Awards	November 9, 2023	Television: Video Promo Craft (Music)	"Alone" by Level Up AV	Silver	
Clio Entertainment Awards	November 9, 2023	Television: Video Promo Craft (Music)	"West" by Create Advertising Group	Nominated	
Clio Entertainment Awards	November 14, 2024	Television: Experiential & Activations (Consumer)	Callao Square installation by AndTonic	Nominated	
Clio Entertainment Awards	November 14, 2024	Television: Experiential & Activations (Special Event & Stunt)	Callao Square installation by AndTonic	Bronze	
Clio Entertainment Awards	November 14, 2024	Television: Out of Home	Callao Square installation by AndTonic	Silver	
Clio Entertainment Awards	November 13, 2025	Television: Audio Visual Craft (Editing)	"Saved" by Level Up AV	Gold	
Clio Entertainment Awards	November 13, 2025	Television: Audio Visual Craft (Music)	"Saved" by Level Up AV	Silver	
Clio Entertainment Awards	November 13, 2025	Television: Audio Visual – Teaser	"Saved" by Level Up AV	Silver	
Clio Entertainment Awards	November 13, 2025	Television: Audio Visual – Trailer	"North" by Create Advertising Group	Bronze	
Clio Entertainment Awards	November 13, 2025	Television: Branded Entertainment & Content	Platform 0 by CYW	Silver	
Clio Entertainment Awards	November 13, 2025	Television: Creative Effectiveness	"North" by Create Advertising Group	Gold	
Clio Entertainment Awards	November 13, 2025	Television: Creative Effectiveness	Platform 0 by CYW	Silver	
Clio Entertainment Awards	November 13, 2025	Television: Design	CES Date Announcement Reveal	Nominated	
Clio Entertainment Awards	November 13, 2025	Television: Experiential & Activations	Platform 0 by CYW	Nominated	
Clio Entertainment Awards	November 13, 2025	Television: Original Content	Making of The Last of Us	Bronze	
Clio Entertainment Awards	November 13, 2025	Television: Out of Home	Platform 0 by CYW	Gold	
Costume Designers Guild Awards	February 21, 2024	Excellence in Contemporary Television	Cynthia Ann Summers (for "Endure and Survive")	Nominated	
Critics' Choice Super Awards	April 4, 2024	Best Superhero Series, Limited Series or Made-for-TV Movie	The Last of Us	Won	
Critics' Choice Super Awards	April 4, 2024	Best Actor in a Superhero Series, Limited Series or Made-for-TV Movie	Pedro Pascal	Won	
Critics' Choice Super Awards	April 4, 2024	Best Actress in a Superhero Series, Limited Series or Made-for-TV Movie	Bella Ramsey	Won	
Critics' Choice Super Awards	April 4, 2024	Best Horror Series, Limited Series or Made-for-TV Movie	The Last of Us	Won	
Critics' Choice Super Awards	April 4, 2024	Best Actor in a Horror Series, Limited Series or Made-for-TV Movie	Pedro Pascal	Won	
Critics' Choice Super Awards	April 4, 2024	Best Actress in a Horror Series, Limited Series or Made-for-TV Movie	Bella Ramsey	Won	
Critics' Choice Super Awards	April 4, 2024	Best Villain in a Series, Limited Series or Made-for-TV Movie	Melanie Lynskey	Won	
Critics' Choice Super Awards	August 7, 2025	Best Superhero Series, Limited Series or Made-for-TV Movie	The Last of Us	Nominated	
Critics' Choice Super Awards	August 7, 2025	Best Actor in a Superhero Series, Limited Series or Made-for-TV Movie	Pedro Pascal	Nominated	
Critics' Choice Super Awards	August 7, 2025	Best Actress in a Superhero Series, Limited Series or Made-for-TV Movie	Bella Ramsey	Nominated	
Critics' Choice Super Awards	August 7, 2025	Best Horror Series, Limited Series or Made-for-TV Movie	The Last of Us	Won	
Critics' Choice Super Awards	August 7, 2025	Best Actor in a Horror Series, Limited Series or Made-for-TV Movie	Pedro Pascal	Won	
Critics' Choice Super Awards	August 7, 2025	Best Actress in a Horror Series, Limited Series or Made-for-TV Movie	Bella Ramsey	Nominated	
Critics' Choice Television Awards	January 14, 2024	Best Drama Series	The Last of Us	Nominated	
Critics' Choice Television Awards	January 14, 2024	Best Actor in a Drama Series	Pedro Pascal	Nominated	
Critics' Choice Television Awards	January 14, 2024	Best Actress in a Drama Series	Bella Ramsey	Nominated	
Critics' Choice Television Awards	January 4, 2026	Best Actress in a Drama Series	Bella Ramsey	Nominated	
Directors Guild of America Awards	February 10, 2024	Outstanding Directing – Drama Series	Peter Hoar (for "Long, Long Time")	Won	
Directors Guild of Canada Awards	November 8, 2025	Drama Series Crew of the Year	The Last of Us	Won	
Dorian Awards	June 26, 2023	Best TV Drama	The Last of Us	Nominated	
Dorian Awards	June 26, 2023	Best LGBTQ TV Show	The Last of Us	Nominated	
Dorian Awards	June 26, 2023	Best TV Performance – Drama	Pedro Pascal	Nominated	
Dorian Awards	June 26, 2023	Best TV Performance – Drama	Bella Ramsey	Nominated	
Dorian Awards	June 26, 2023	Best Supporting TV Performance – Drama	Murray Bartlett	Nominated	
Dorian Awards	June 26, 2023	Best Supporting TV Performance – Drama	Nick Offerman	Nominated	
Dorian Awards	June 26, 2023	Best TV Musical Performance	Nick Offerman – "Long, Long Time"	Nominated	
Dorian Awards	June 26, 2023	Most Visually Striking Show	The Last of Us	Won	
Dorian Awards	July 8, 2025	Best TV Drama	The Last of Us	Nominated	
Dorian Awards	July 8, 2025	Best TV Performance – Drama	Pedro Pascal	Nominated	
Dorian Awards	July 8, 2025	Best TV Performance – Drama	Bella Ramsey	Nominated	
Dorian Awards	July 8, 2025	Best Genre TV Show	The Last of Us	Nominated	
Dorian Awards	July 8, 2025	GALECA LGBTQIA+ TV Trailblazer Award	Bella Ramsey	Nominated	
Fangoria Chainsaw Awards	October 13, 2024	Best Television Series	The Last of Us	Won	
Fangoria Chainsaw Awards	October 19, 2025	Best Series	The Last of Us	Won	
The Game Awards	December 7, 2023	Best Adaptation	The Last of Us	Won	
The Game Awards	December 11, 2025	Best Adaptation	The Last of Us season 2	Won	
GEMA Awards	October 17, 2024	360 Campaign: Program Promotion	Game to Game-Changer: HBO's The Last of Us	Bronze	
GEMA Awards	October 17, 2024	Behind the Scenes	The Making of The Last of Us	Gold	
GEMA Awards	October 17, 2024	Fan Driven	The Last of Us Day: Celebrating Fan Creations	Gold	
GEMA Awards	October 17, 2024	Poster	The Last of Us (Specialty Art)	Nominated	
GEMA Awards	October 17, 2024	Out-of-Home	The Last of Us (Mural Arts)	Nominated	
GLAAD Media Awards	May 11, 2024	Outstanding New TV Series	The Last of Us	Won	
GLAAD Media Awards	March 5, 2026	Outstanding Drama Series	The Last of Us	Nominated	
Golden Globe Awards	January 7, 2024	Best Television Series – Drama	The Last of Us	Nominated	
Golden Globe Awards	January 7, 2024	Best Actor – Television Series Drama	Pedro Pascal	Nominated	
Golden Globe Awards	January 7, 2024	Best Actress – Television Series Drama	Bella Ramsey	Nominated	
Golden Globe Awards	January 11, 2026	Best Actress – Television Series Drama	Bella Ramsey	Nominated	
Golden Joystick Awards	November 20, 2025	Best Game Adaptation	The Last of Us	Nominated	
Golden Reel Awards	March 3, 2024	Outstanding Achievement in Sound Editing – Broadcast Long Form Dialogue and ADR	Michael J. Benavente and Joe Schiff (for "Long, Long Time")	Nominated	
Golden Reel Awards	March 3, 2024	Outstanding Achievement in Sound Editing – Broadcast Long Form Effects and Foley	Michael J. Benavente, Chris Battaglia, Chris Terhune, Mitchell Lestner, Matt Yocum, Randy Wilson, Davi Aquino, Justin Hale, Justin Charbonneau, Stefan Fraticelli, and William Kellerman (for "When You're Lost in the Darkness")	Nominated	
Golden Reel Awards	March 3, 2024	Outstanding Achievement in Music Editing – Broadcast Long Form	Maarten Hofmeijer (for "When You're Lost in the Darkness")	Won	
Golden Reel Awards	March 8, 2026	Outstanding Achievement in Sound Editing – Broadcast Long Form Effects and Foley	Michael J. Benavente, Randy Wilson, Christopher Battaglia, Chris Terhune, Mitchell Lestner, Jacob Flack, Odin Benitez, Joe Schiff, Justin Helle, Ron Mellegers, Stefan Fraticelli, Brandon Bak, Jason Charbonneau, and Biko Gogaladze (for "Through the Valley")	Nominated	
Golden Reel Awards	March 8, 2026	Outstanding Achievement in Music Editing – Broadcast Long Form	Maarten Hofmeijer (for "Through the Valley")	Nominated	
Golden Trailer Awards	June 29, 2023	Best Music for a TV / Streaming Series	"Alone"	Nominated	
Golden Trailer Awards	May 29, 2025	Best Drama (Trailer/Teaser)	"North"	Nominated	
Golden Trailer Awards	May 29, 2025	Best Horror / Thriller (Trailer/Teaser)	"Saved"	Nominated	
Golden Trailer Awards	May 29, 2025	Best Music (Trailer/Teaser)	"Saved"	Nominated	
Golden Trailer Awards	May 29, 2025	Best Sound Editing (Trailer/Teaser)	"Saved"	Nominated	
Golden Trailer Awards	May 29, 2025	Most Original (Trailer/Teaser)	"Saved"	Nominated	
Golden Trailer Awards	May 29, 2025	Best Action TV Spot – TV/Streaming	The Last of Us season 2	Nominated	
Golden Trailer Awards	May 29, 2025	Best Drama TV Spot – TV/Streaming	The Last of Us season 2	Nominated	
Golden Trailer Awards	May 29, 2025	Best Drama / Action Poster	The Last of Us season 2 teaser	Won	
Golden Trailer Awards	May 29, 2025	Best Wildposts	The Last of Us season 2 teaser	Nominated	
Golden Trailer Awards	May 28, 2026	Best BTS / EPK for a TV / Streaming Series (Over 2 Minutes)	The Last of Us: Inside the Episode 202	Won	
Golden Trailer Awards	May 28, 2026	Best Documentary / Reality Poster (for a TV / Streaming Series)	The Last of Us season 2 key art	Nominated	
Gotham Awards	November 27, 2023	Outstanding Performance in a New Series	Bella Ramsey	Nominated	
Gotham Awards	November 27, 2023	Breakthrough Television Over 40 Minutes	The Last of Us	Nominated	
Hollywood Music in Media Awards	November 15, 2023	Best Music Supervision – Television	Ian Broucek	Won	
Hollywood Music in Media Awards	November 19, 2025	Best Original Score – TV Show / Limited Series	Gustavo Santaolalla and David Fleming	Nominated	
Hollywood Professional Association Awards	November 28, 2023	Outstanding Editing – Episode or Non-Theatrical Feature (Over 30 Minutes)	Timothy A. Good and Emily Mendez (for "Endure and Survive")	Nominated	
Hollywood Professional Association Awards	November 28, 2023	Outstanding Sound – Episode or Non-Theatrical Feature	Michael Benavente, Marc Fishman, Kevin Roache, Chris Terhune, and Chris Battaglia (for "Infected")	Won	
Hollywood Professional Association Awards	November 28, 2023	Outstanding Visual Effects – Live Action Episode or Series Season	Simon Jung, Aaron Cowan, David Hampton, Dennis Yoo, and Ben Roberts	Nominated	
Hugo Awards	August 11, 2024	Best Dramatic Presentation, Short Form	"Long, Long Time"	Won	
Humanitas Prize	August 15, 2023	Drama Teleplay	Craig Mazin (for "Long, Long Time")	Won	
Humanitas Prize	September 7, 2025	Drama Teleplay	Neil Druckmann, Halley Gross, and Craig Mazin (for "The Price")	Nominated	
Imagen Awards	December 3, 2023	Best Music Composition for Film or Television	Gustavo Santaolalla	Won	
Imagen Awards	December 3, 2023	Best Actor – Drama	Pedro Pascal	Won	
Imagen Awards	December 3, 2023	Best Supporting Actor – Drama	Gabriel Luna	Nominated	
Imagen Awards	August 22, 2025	Best Music Composition for Film or Television	Gustavo Santaolalla	Won	
Imagen Awards	August 22, 2025	Best Drama Series	The Last of Us	Won	
Imagen Awards	August 22, 2025	Best Actor – Drama	Pedro Pascal	Nominated	
Imagen Awards	August 22, 2025	Best Supporting Actor – Drama	Gabriel Luna	Won	
Independent Spirit Awards	February 25, 2024	Best Lead Performance in a New Scripted Series	Bella Ramsey	Nominated	
Independent Spirit Awards	February 25, 2024	Best Breakthrough Performance in a New Scripted Series	Keivonn Montreal Woodard	Won	
Independent Spirit Awards	February 25, 2024	Best Supporting Performance in a New Scripted Series	Nick Offerman	Won	
Independent Spirit Awards	February 25, 2024	Best Supporting Performance in a New Scripted Series	Murray Bartlett	Nominated	
Location Managers Guild Awards	August 26, 2023	Outstanding Locations in a Contemporary Television Series	Jason Nolan and Mohammad Qazzaz	Won	
Location Managers Guild Awards	August 26, 2023	Outstanding Film Commission	Alberta Film Commissions and Calgary Economic Development	Won	
Location Managers Guild Awards	August 23, 2025	Outstanding Locations in a Contemporary Television Series	The Last of Us	Nominated	
Location Managers Guild Awards	August 23, 2025	Outstanding Film Commission	British Columbia Film Commission, Creative BC	Nominated	
MacGuffin Awards	September 14, 2024	One-Hour Fantasy / Science Fiction Television Series	Justin Onofriechuk	Won	
MacGuffin Awards	September 13, 2025	One-Hour Fantasy / Science Fiction Television Series	Nevin Swain	Nominated	
Make-Up Artists and Hair Stylists Guild Awards	February 18, 2024	Best Special Make-Up Effects in a Television Series, Limited, Miniseries, or Movie for Television	Barrie Gower, Paul Spateri, Sarah Gower, and Paula Eden	Won	
Make-Up Artists and Hair Stylists Guild Awards	February 18, 2024	Best Contemporary Make-Up in a Television Series, Limited, Miniseries, or Movie for Television	Connie Parker, Joanna Mireau, Joanne Preece, and Danielle Hanson	Nominated	
Make-Up Artists and Hair Stylists Guild Awards	February 14, 2026	Best Special Make-Up Prosthetics in a Television Series, Limited, Miniseries, or Movie for Television	Barrie Gower, Mike Mekash, Duncan Jarman	Nominated	
MTV Millennial Awards	August 6, 2023	Killer Series / Movie	The Last of Us	Nominated	
MTV Movie & TV Awards	May 7, 2023	Best Show	The Last of Us	Won	
MTV Movie & TV Awards	May 7, 2023	Best Hero	Pedro Pascal	Won	
MTV Movie & TV Awards	May 7, 2023	Best Kiss	Anna Torv and Philip Prajoux	Nominated	
MTV Movie & TV Awards	May 7, 2023	Breakthrough Performance	Bella Ramsey	Nominated	
MTV Movie & TV Awards	May 7, 2023	Best Duo	Pedro Pascal and Bella Ramsey	Won	
MTV Movie & TV Awards	May 7, 2023	Best Musical Moment	"Long, Long Time" (Bill and Frank play piano)	Nominated	
NAACP Image Awards	March 16, 2024	Outstanding Performance by a Youth (Series, Special, Television Movie or Limited-Series)	Keivonn Montreal Woodard	Nominated	
NHMC Impact Awards Gala	June 6, 2025	Next Generation Impact Award	Isabela Merced (Note: Isabela Merced was honored "for her myriad of performances across film and television", including The Last of Us and Superman (2025).)	Won	
Peabody Awards	June 9, 2024	Entertainment	The Last of Us	Won	
People's Choice Awards	February 18, 2024	The Show of the Year	The Last of Us	Nominated	
People's Choice Awards	February 18, 2024	The Drama Show of the Year	The Last of Us	Won	
People's Choice Awards	February 18, 2024	The Male TV Star of the Year	Pedro Pascal	Won	
People's Choice Awards	February 18, 2024	The Drama TV Star of the Year	Pedro Pascal	Nominated	
People's Choice Awards	February 18, 2024	The Drama TV Star of the Year	Bella Ramsey	Nominated	
People's Choice Awards	February 18, 2024	The TV Performance of the Year	Storm Reid	Nominated	
Primetime Creative Arts Emmy Awards	January 6, 2024	Outstanding Casting for a Drama Series	Victoria Thomas, Corinne Clark, and Jennifer Page	Nominated	
Primetime Creative Arts Emmy Awards	January 6, 2024	Outstanding Contemporary Costumes for a Series	Cynthia Ann Summers, Kelsey Chobotar, Rebecca Toon, and Michelle Carr (for "Endure and Survive")	Nominated	
Primetime Creative Arts Emmy Awards	January 6, 2024	Outstanding Prosthetic Makeup	Barrie Gower, Sarah Gower, Paul Spateri, Nelly Guimaras Sanjuan, Johnny Murphy, Joel Hall, and Lucy Pittard (for "Infected")	Won	
Primetime Creative Arts Emmy Awards	January 6, 2024	Outstanding Contemporary Makeup (Non-Prosthetic)	Connie Parker and Joanna Mireau (for "Long, Long Time")	Nominated	
Primetime Creative Arts Emmy Awards	January 6, 2024	Outstanding Contemporary Hairstyling	Chris Glimsdale, Penny Thompson, and Courtney Ullrich (for "Long, Long Time")	Nominated	
Primetime Creative Arts Emmy Awards	January 6, 2024	Outstanding Production Design for a Narrative Contemporary Program (One Hour or More)	John Paino, Don Macaulay, and Paul Healy (for "Infected")	Nominated	
Primetime Creative Arts Emmy Awards	January 6, 2024	Outstanding Special Visual Effects in a Season or a Movie	Alex Wang, Sean Nowlan, Joel Whist, Stephen James, Nick Marshall, Simon Jung, Dennis Yoo, Espen Nordahl, and Jonathan Mitchell	Won	
Primetime Creative Arts Emmy Awards	January 6, 2024	Outstanding Main Title Design	Andy Hall, Nadia Tzuo, Gryun Kim, Min Shi, Jun Kim, and Xiaolin (Mike) Zeng	Won	
Primetime Creative Arts Emmy Awards	January 6, 2024	Outstanding Sound Editing for a Comedy or Drama Series (One Hour)	Michael J. Benavente, Joe Schiff, Christopher Battaglia, Chris Terhune, Mitchell Lestner, Jacob Flack, Matt Yocum, Maarten Hofmeijer, Randy Wilson, Justin Hele, Davi Aquino, Stefan Fraticelli, Jason Charbonneau, and William Kellerman (for "When You're Lost in the Darkness")	Won	
Primetime Creative Arts Emmy Awards	January 6, 2024	Outstanding Sound Mixing for a Comedy or Drama Series (One Hour)	Marc Fishman, Kevin Roache, and Michael Playfair (for "When You're Lost in the Darkness")	Won	
Primetime Creative Arts Emmy Awards	January 6, 2024	Outstanding Music Composition for a Series (Original Dramatic Score)	Gustavo Santaolalla (for "Long, Long Time")	Nominated	
Primetime Creative Arts Emmy Awards	January 6, 2024	Outstanding Picture Editing for a Drama Series	Timothy A. Good and Emily Mendez (for "Endure and Survive")	Won	
Primetime Creative Arts Emmy Awards	January 6, 2024	Outstanding Guest Actress in a Drama Series	Melanie Lynskey (for "Endure and Survive")	Nominated	
Primetime Creative Arts Emmy Awards	January 6, 2024	Outstanding Guest Actress in a Drama Series	Storm Reid (for "Left Behind")	Won	
Primetime Creative Arts Emmy Awards	January 6, 2024	Outstanding Guest Actress in a Drama Series	Anna Torv (for "Infected")	Nominated	
Primetime Creative Arts Emmy Awards	January 6, 2024	Outstanding Guest Actor in a Drama Series	Murray Bartlett (for "Long, Long Time")	Nominated	
Primetime Creative Arts Emmy Awards	January 6, 2024	Outstanding Guest Actor in a Drama Series	Lamar Johnson (for "Endure and Survive")	Nominated	
Primetime Creative Arts Emmy Awards	January 6, 2024	Outstanding Guest Actor in a Drama Series	Nick Offerman (for "Long, Long Time")	Won	
Primetime Creative Arts Emmy Awards	January 6, 2024	Outstanding Guest Actor in a Drama Series	Keivonn Montreal Woodard (for "Endure and Survive")	Nominated	
Primetime Creative Arts Emmy Awards	January 7, 2024	Outstanding Short Form Nonfiction or Reality Series	Emily Giannussa, Juli Carbal, Badger Denehy, Eddie Maldonado, and Kathy Rocklein Sontag (for The Last of Us: Inside the Episode)	Nominated	
Primetime Creative Arts Emmy Awards	September 6, 2025	Outstanding Casting for a Drama Series	Mary Vernieu, Lindsay Graham Ahanonu, Sydney Shircliff, Corinne Clark, and Jennifer Page	Nominated	
Primetime Creative Arts Emmy Awards	September 6, 2025	Outstanding Prosthetic Makeup	Paul Spateri, Barrie Gower, Lucy Pittard, Johnny Murphy, Colum Mangan, Gillian Jarvis, Sarah Pickersgill, and Chris Devitt (for "Feel Her Love")	Nominated	
Primetime Creative Arts Emmy Awards	September 6, 2025	Outstanding Contemporary Makeup (Non-Prosthetic)	Rebecca Lee, Krystal Devlin, Amber Trudeau, Leslie Graham, Jessica Wong, and Chelsea Matthews (for "Day One")	Nominated	
Primetime Creative Arts Emmy Awards	September 6, 2025	Outstanding Special Visual Effects in a Season or a Movie	Alex Wang, Fiona Campbell Westgate, Jed Glassford, Joel Whist, Stephen James, Nick Epstein, Dennis Yoo, Philip Engström, and Andreas Giesen	Nominated	
Primetime Creative Arts Emmy Awards	September 6, 2025	Outstanding Sound Mixing for a Comedy or Drama Series (One Hour)	Marc Fishman, Samuel Ejnes, Chris Duesterdiek, Jeffrey Roy, and Tami Treadwell (for "Through the Valley")	Nominated	
Primetime Creative Arts Emmy Awards	September 6, 2025	Outstanding Sound Editing for a Comedy or Drama Series (One Hour)	Michael J. Benavente, Chris Terhune, Joe Schiff, Christopher Battaglia, Mitchell Lestner, Jacob Flack, Odin Benitez, James Miller, Randy Wilson, Justin Helle, Ron Mellegers, Maarten Hofmeijer, Stefan Fraticelli, Brandon Bak, and Jason Charbonneau (for "Through the Valley")	Won	
Primetime Creative Arts Emmy Awards	September 6, 2025	Outstanding Production Design for a Narrative Contemporary Program (One Hour or More)	Don Macaulay, David Clarke, Jonathan Lancaster, and Lisa Lancaster (for "Day One")	Nominated	
Primetime Creative Arts Emmy Awards	September 6, 2025	Outstanding Picture Editing for a Drama Series	Timothy A. Good (for "Through the Valley")	Nominated	
Primetime Creative Arts Emmy Awards	September 6, 2025	Outstanding Music Supervision	Evyen Klean, Ian Broucek, and Scott Hanau (for "The Price")	Nominated	
Primetime Creative Arts Emmy Awards	September 6, 2025	Outstanding Guest Actress in a Drama Series	Kaitlyn Dever (for "Through the Valley")	Nominated	
Primetime Creative Arts Emmy Awards	September 6, 2025	Outstanding Guest Actress in a Drama Series	Catherine O'Hara (for "Future Days")	Nominated	
Primetime Creative Arts Emmy Awards	September 6, 2025	Outstanding Guest Actor in a Drama Series	Joe Pantoliano (for "The Price")	Nominated	
Primetime Creative Arts Emmy Awards	September 6, 2025	Outstanding Guest Actor in a Drama Series	Jeffrey Wright (for "Day One")	Nominated	
Primetime Creative Arts Emmy Awards	September 7, 2025	Outstanding Short Form Nonfiction or Reality Series	Badger Denehy, Eddie Maldonado, Sarah Mangum, Montres Henderson, Lindsay Nowak, and Chris Harnick (for Making of The Last of Us)	Nominated	
Primetime Emmy Awards	January 15, 2024	Outstanding Drama Series	Craig Mazin, Neil Druckmann, Carolyn Strauss, Rose Lam, Asad Qizilbash, Carter Swan, Evan Wells, Jacqueline Lesko, Greg Spence, and Cecil O'Connor (for The Last of Us) (Note: Episodes submitted: "When You're Lost in the Darkness", "Infected", "Long, Long Time", "Endure and Survive", "When We Are in Need", and "Look for the Light")	Nominated	
Primetime Emmy Awards	January 15, 2024	Outstanding Lead Actor in a Drama Series	Pedro Pascal (for "Kin")	Nominated	
Primetime Emmy Awards	January 15, 2024	Outstanding Lead Actress in a Drama Series	Bella Ramsey (for "When We Are in Need")	Nominated	
Primetime Emmy Awards	January 15, 2024	Outstanding Directing for a Drama Series	Peter Hoar (for "Long, Long Time")	Nominated	
Primetime Emmy Awards	January 15, 2024	Outstanding Writing for a Drama Series	Craig Mazin (for "Long, Long Time")	Nominated	
Primetime Emmy Awards	September 14, 2025	Outstanding Drama Series	Craig Mazin, Neil Druckmann, Carolyn Strauss, Jacqueline Lesko, Cecil O'Connor, Asad Qizilbash, Carter Swan, Evan Wells, Halley Gross, Allen Marshall Palmer, and Julie Herrin (for The Last of Us) (Note: Episodes submitted: "Future Days", "Through the Valley", "Day One", "Feel Her Love", "The Price", and "Convergence")	Nominated	
Primetime Emmy Awards	September 14, 2025	Outstanding Lead Actor in a Drama Series	Pedro Pascal (for "The Price")	Nominated	
Primetime Emmy Awards	September 14, 2025	Outstanding Lead Actress in a Drama Series	Bella Ramsey (for "Convergence")	Nominated	
Producers Guild of America Awards	February 25, 2024	Norman Felton Award for Outstanding Producer of Episodic Television – Drama	The Last of Us	Nominated	
Producers Guild of America Awards	February 25, 2024	Outstanding Short-Form Program	The Last of Us: Inside the Episode	Nominated	
Rockie Awards	June 13, 2023	Program of the Year	The Last of Us	Won	
Rockie Awards	June 11, 2024	Drama Series: English Language	The Last of Us	Won	
Rockie Awards	June 11, 2024	Grand Jury Prize	The Last of Us	Won	
Royal Television Society Craft & Design Awards	December 8, 2025	Make Up Design – Scripted	Barrie Gower	Won	
Satellite Awards	March 3, 2024	Best Drama Series	The Last of Us	Won	
Satellite Awards	March 3, 2024	Best Actor – Drama or Genre Series	Pedro Pascal	Nominated	
Satellite Awards	March 3, 2024	Best Actress – Drama or Genre Series	Bella Ramsey	Nominated	
Satellite Awards	March 3, 2024	Best Supporting Actor – Series, Miniseries & Limited Series, or Motion Picture Made for Television	Murray Bartlett	Nominated	
Satellite Awards	March 3, 2024	Best Supporting Actor – Series, Miniseries & Limited Series, or Motion Picture Made for Television	Lamar Johnson	Nominated	
Satellite Awards	March 28, 2026	Best Genre Series	The Last of Us	Nominated	
Saturn Awards	February 4, 2024	Best Horror Television Series	The Last of Us	Won	
Saturn Awards	February 4, 2024	Best New Genre Television Series	The Last of Us	Nominated	
Saturn Awards	February 4, 2024	Best Actor in a Television Series	Pedro Pascal	Nominated	
Saturn Awards	February 4, 2024	Best Performance by a Younger Actor in a Television Series	Bella Ramsey	Nominated	
Saturn Awards	February 4, 2024	Best Guest Star in a Television Series	Nick Offerman	Nominated	
Saturn Awards	March 8, 2026	Best Horror Television Series	The Last of Us	Nominated	
Set Decorators Society of America Awards	August 2, 2023	Best Achievement in Décor / Design of a One Hour Fantasy or Science Fiction Series	Paul Healy, John Paino	Nominated	
Set Decorators Society of America Awards	August 10, 2025	Best Achievement in Décor / Design of a One Hour Fantasy or Science Fiction Series	Jonathan Lancaster, Lisa Lancaster, and Don Macaulay	Won	
SCL Awards	February 13, 2024	Outstanding Original Score for a Television Production	Gustavo Santaolalla	Nominated	
SCL Awards	February 6, 2026	Outstanding Original Score for a Television Production	David Fleming and Gustavo Santaolalla	Nominated	
Screen Actors Guild Awards / Actor Awards	February 24, 2024	Outstanding Performance by an Ensemble in a Drama Series	Pedro Pascal and Bella Ramsey	Nominated	
Screen Actors Guild Awards / Actor Awards	February 24, 2024	Outstanding Performance by a Female Actor in a Drama Series	Bella Ramsey	Nominated	
Screen Actors Guild Awards / Actor Awards	February 24, 2024	Outstanding Performance by a Male Actor in a Drama Series	Pedro Pascal	Won	
Screen Actors Guild Awards / Actor Awards	February 24, 2024	Outstanding Performance by a Stunt Ensemble in a Television Series	The Last of Us	Won	
Screen Actors Guild Awards / Actor Awards	March 1, 2026	Outstanding Performance by a Stunt Ensemble in a Television Series	The Last of Us	Won	
Television Critics Association Awards	August 7, 2023	Program of the Year	The Last of Us	Nominated	
Television Critics Association Awards	August 7, 2023	Outstanding New Program	The Last of Us	Nominated	
Television Critics Association Awards	August 7, 2023	Outstanding Achievement in Drama	The Last of Us	Nominated	
Television Critics Association Awards	August 7, 2023	Individual Achievement in Drama	Pedro Pascal	Nominated	
Television Critics Association Awards	August 7, 2023	Individual Achievement in Drama	Bella Ramsey	Nominated	
Television Critics Association Awards	August 20, 2025	Outstanding Achievement in Drama	The Last of Us	Nominated	
UBCP/ACTRA Awards	November 26, 2025	Best Stunt Performance	Marny Eng, Colin Decker, Leanne Buchanan, Colby Chartrand, Kory Grim, Adrian Hein, Coulton Jackson, Trevor Jones, Anthony Moyer, Matthew Mylrea, Angela Uyeda, and Jonathan Vellner (for "Through the Valley")	Nominated	
UBCP/ACTRA Awards	November 26, 2025	Best Stunt Performance	Marny Eng, Colin Decker, and Jonathan Vellner (for "Through the Valley")	Won	
USC Scripter Awards	March 2, 2024	Best Adapted Screenplay – Television	Craig Mazin (for "Long, Long Time")	Nominated	
Visual Effects Society Awards	February 21, 2024	Outstanding Visual Effects in a Photoreal Episode	Alex Wang, Sean Nowlan, Stephen James, Simon Jung, and Joel Whist (for "Infected")	Won	
Visual Effects Society Awards	February 21, 2024	Outstanding Animated Character in an Episode or Real-Time Project	Gino Acevedo, Max Telfer, Dennis Yoo, Fabio Leporelli (for "Endure and Survive"; Bloater)	Won	
Visual Effects Society Awards	February 21, 2024	Outstanding Created Environment in an Episode, Commercial, Game Cinematic or Real-Time Project	Pascal Raimbault, Nick Cattell, Jasper Hayward, and Kristine-Joeann Jasper (for "Look for the Light"; Salt Lake City)	Nominated	
Visual Effects Society Awards	February 21, 2024	Outstanding Created Environment in an Episode, Commercial, Game Cinematic or Real-Time Project	Melaina Mace, Adrien Lambert, Juan Carlos Barquet, and Christopher Anciaume (for Post-Outbreak Boston)	Won	
Visual Effects Society Awards	February 21, 2024	Outstanding Compositing and Lighting in an Episode	Matthew Lumb, Ben Roberts, Ben Campbell, and Quentin Hema (for "Endure and Survive"; Infected Horde Battle)	Won	
Visual Effects Society Awards	February 21, 2024	Outstanding Compositing and Lighting in an Episode	Casey Gorton, Francesco Dell'Anna, Vaclav Kubant, and Natalia Valbuena (for "Infected"; Boston)	Nominated	
Visual Effects Society Awards	February 25, 2026	Outstanding Visual Effects in a Photoreal Episode	Alex Wang, Fiona Campbell Westgate, Nick Epstein, Philip Engström, and Joel Whist (for "Through the Valley")	Nominated	
Visual Effects Society Awards	February 25, 2026	Outstanding Created Environment in an Episodic, Commercial, Game Cinematic, or Real-Time Project	Romain Simonnet, Abraham Ibanez, David Desplat, and Minguk Lee (for Post-Apocalyptic Seattle)	Nominated	
Visual Effects Society Awards	February 25, 2026	Outstanding Effects Simulations in an Episode, Commercial, Game Cinematic, or Real-Time Project	Duarte Victorino, Claudio Gonzalez, Andre Castelao, and Igor Bondar (for "Through the Valley"; The Infected Horde)	Nominated	
Visual Effects Society Awards	February 25, 2026	Outstanding Compositing and Lighting in an Episode	Tobias Wiesner, Mark Julien, Owen Longstaff, and Brendan Naylor (for "Through the Valley"; A Storm of Ice, Fire and Flesh)	Won	
Webby Awards	April 23, 2024	Video – Series (Branded)	The Last of Us | Sony's Creator to Creator	Won	
Webby Awards	April 23, 2024	Podcasts – Television & Film	HBO's The Last of Us Podcast	Won	
Webby Awards	April 23, 2024	Podcasts – Television & Film (Ind. Episodes)	HBO's The Last of Us Podcast	Nominated	
Webby Awards	April 23, 2024	Social – Television & Film	The Last of Us Instagram Page	Nominated	
World Soundtrack Awards	October 21, 2023	Television Composer of the Year	Gustavo Santaolalla and David Fleming	Nominated	
World Soundtrack Awards	October 15, 2025	Television Composer of the Year	Gustavo Santaolalla and David Fleming	Nominated	
Writers Guild of America Awards	April 14, 2024	Drama Series	Neil Druckmann, Halley Gross, Craig Mazin, and Bo Shim	Nominated	
Writers Guild of America Awards	April 14, 2024	New Series	Neil Druckmann, Halley Gross, Craig Mazin, and Bo Shim	Won	

== Multiple awards and nominations ==
=== Cast ===
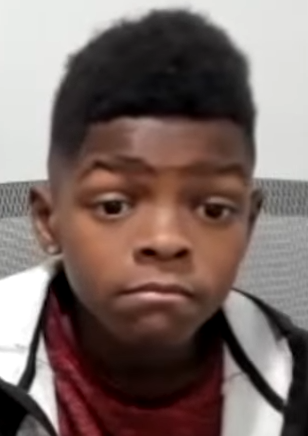
Keivonn Montreal Woodard received five nominations for his guest role, of which he won two.

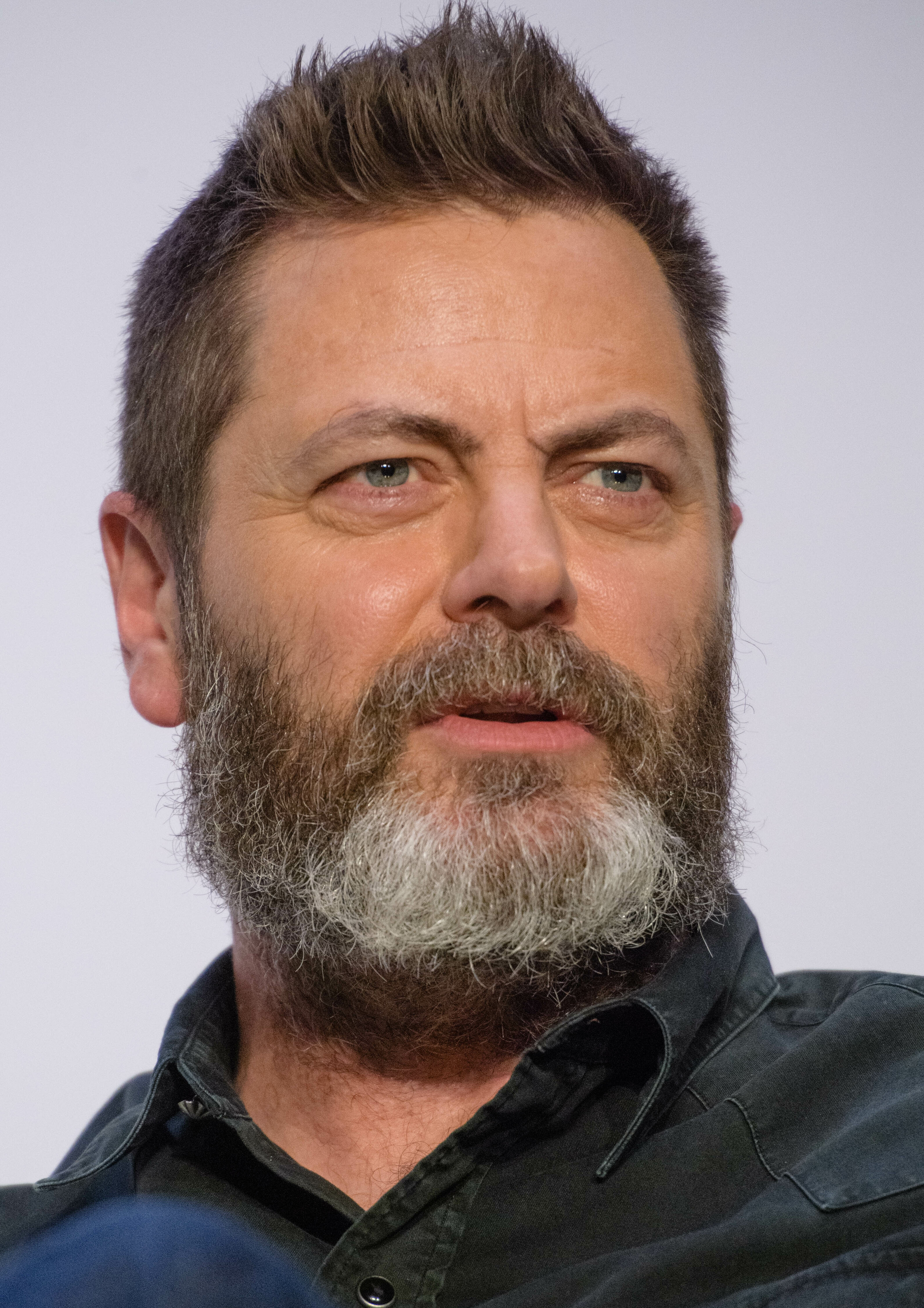
Nick Offerman won three awards for the series, including Outstanding Guest Actor at the Emmy Awards.

Multiple awards and nominations for cast
Actor	Character	Nominations	Awards
Bella Ramsey	Ellie	27	3
Pedro Pascal	Joel	25	9
Nick Offerman	Bill	6	3
Keivonn Montreal Woodard	Sam	5	2
Murray Bartlett	Frank	5	0
Storm Reid	Riley	3	2
Melanie Lynskey	Kathleen	3	1
Jeffrey Wright	Isaac	3	1
Lamar Johnson	Henry	3	0
Isabela Merced	Dina	2	2
Gabriel Luna	Tommy	2	1
Kaitlyn Dever	Abby	2	0
Catherine O'Hara	Gail	2	0
Joe Pantoliano	Eugene	2	0
Nico Parker	Sarah	2	0
Anna Torv	Tess	2	0

=== Crew ===
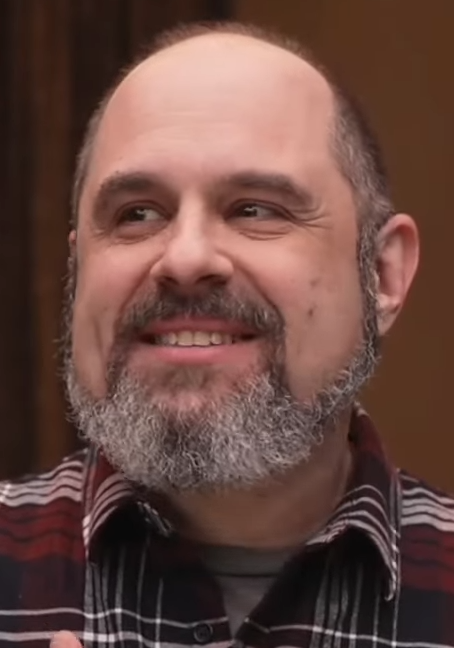
Craig Mazin received five nominations for the first season, including three for writing "Long, Long Time".

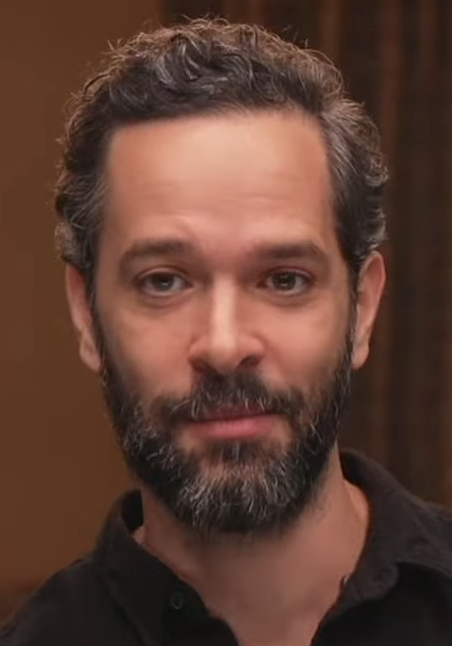
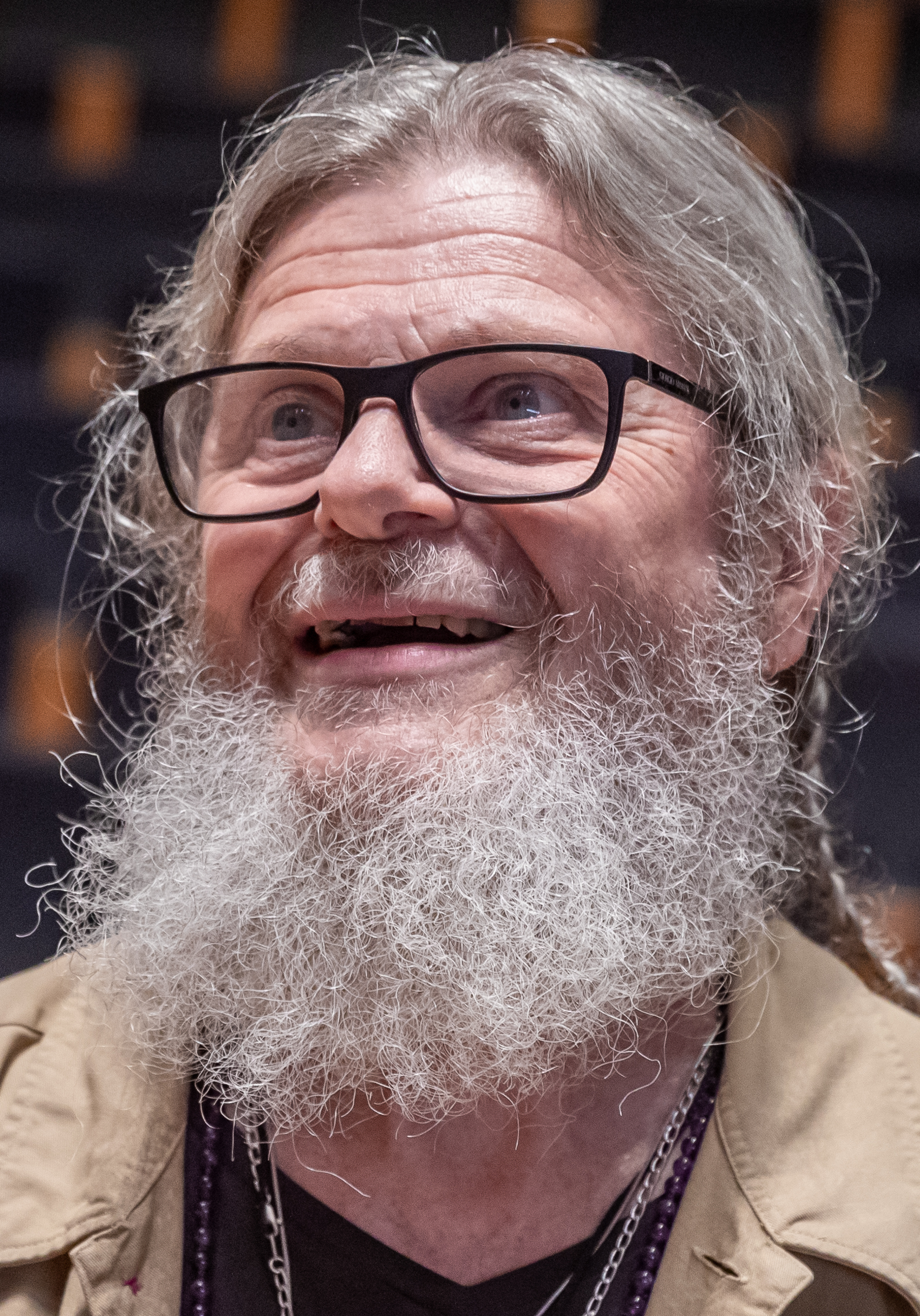
Neil Druckmann (top) and Gustavo Santaolalla (bottom), who worked on the video games, received several nominations for the series.

Multiple awards and nominations for crew
Name	Role	Nominations	Awards
Gustavo Santaolalla	Composer	10	4
Craig Mazin	Creator, writer, director, executive producer	9	2
Michael J. Benavente	Supervising sound editor	6	3
Don Macaulay	Supervising art director / Production designer	6	2
Christopher Battaglia	Sound designer	5	3
Barrie Gower	Prosthetics designer	5	3
Chris Terhune	Sound designer	5	3
Randy Wilson	Supervising foley editor	5	3
Neil Druckmann	Creator, writer, director, executive producer	5	1
David Fleming	Composer	5	0
Marc Fishman	Re-recording mixer	4	3
Maarten Hofmeijer	Music editor	4	3
Jason Charbonneau	Foley artist	4	2
Stefan Fraticelli	Foley artist	4	2
Timothy A. Good	Editor	4	2
Mitchell Lestner	Sound effects editor	4	2
Joe Schiff	Dialogue editor	4	2
Alex Wang	Overall visual effects supervisor	4	2
Joel Whist	Production SFX supervisor	4	2
Dennis Yoo	Animation supervisor	4	2
Corinne Clark	Location casting	4	1
Halley Gross	Writer, co-executive producer	4	1
Jennifer Page	Location casting	4	1
John Paino	Production designer	4	1
Kevin Roache	Re-recording mixer	3	3
Jacob Flack	Sound effects editor	3	2
Peter Hoar	Director	3	2
Stephen James	Visual effects supervisor (DNEG)	3	2
Simon Jung	Visual effects supervisor (Wētā FX)	3	2
Paul Spateri	Key prosthetics makeup artist	3	2
Sarah Gower	Prosthetics co-department head	2	2
Sean Nowlan	Overall visual effects producer	2	2
Michael Playfair	Production mixer	2	2
Davi Aquino	Foley editor	2	1
Brandon Bak	Foley artist	2	1
Megan Bayliss	Location associate casting director	2	1
Odin Benitez	Sound effects editor	2	1
Ian Broucek	Music supervisor	2	1
Colin Decker	Fire coordinator	2	1
Marny Eng	Stunt coordinator	2	1
Justin Helle	Foley editor	2	1
William Kellerman	Foley artist	2	1
Jonathan Lancaster	Set decorator	2	1
Lisa Lancaster	Set decorator	2	1
Ron Mellegers	Foley editor	2	1
Johnny Murphy	Key prosthetic makeup artist	2	1
Lucy Pittard	Key prosthetic makeup artist	2	1
Ben Roberts	Compositing supervisor	2	1
Bo Shim	Writer	2	1
Victoria Thomas	Casting director	2	1
Jonathan Vellner	Stunt performer	2	1
Callum Webster	Art director	2	1
Matt Yocum	Sound effects editor	2	1
Badger Denehy	Marketing executive producer	2	0
Philip Engström	Visual effects supervisor	2	0
Nick Epstein	Visual effects supervisor	2	0
Lindsay Graham Ahanonu	Casting director	2	0
Paul Healy	Set decorator	2	0
Jacqueline Lesko	Co-executive producer / executive producer	2	0
Eddie Maldonado	Marketing executive producer	2	0
Joanna Mireau	Key makeup artist	2	0
Cecil O'Connor	Producer / executive producer	2	0
Connie Parker	Makeup artist department head	2	0
Asad Qizilbash	Executive producer	2	0
Sydney Shircliff	Casting director	2	0
Carolyn Strauss	Executive producer	2	0
Cynthia Ann Summers	Costume designer	2	0
Carter Swan	Executive producer	2	0
Mary Vernieu	Casting director	2	0
Evan Wells	Executive producer	2	0
Fiona Campbell Westgate	Visual effects producer	2	0

=== Episodes ===
Awards and nominations per episode
Season	Episode		Nominations	Awards
1	1	"When You're Lost in the Darkness"	7	4
1	2	"Infected"	8	4
1	3	"Long, Long Time"	23	7
1	4	"Please Hold to My Hand"	0	0
1	5	"Endure and Survive"	16	5
1	6	"Kin"	1	0
1	7	"Left Behind"	3	2
1	8	"When We Are in Need"	1	0
1	9	"Look for the Light"	1	0
2	1	"Future Days"	1	0
2	2	"Through the Valley"	13	2
2	3	"The Path"	0	0
2	4	"Day One"	4	0
2	5	"Feel Her Love"	1	0
2	6	"The Price"	5	0
2	7	"Convergence"	1	0

== See also ==
- List of Primetime Emmy Awards received by HBO
