= Chernobyl: Abyss =

2021 film by Danila Kozlovsky

Chernobyl: Abyss (Chernobyl 1986)
- Theatrical release poster
- Directed by: Danila Kozlovsky
- Written by: Aleksey Kazakov; Elena Ivanova
- Produced by: Alexander Rodnyansky; Sergey Melkumov; Danila Kozlovsky; Vadim Vereshchagin; Rafael Minasbekyan
- Starring: Danila Kozlovsky; Oksana Akinshina; Filipp Avdeyev; Ravshana Kurkova; Nikolay Kozak
- Cinematography: Ksenia Sereda
- Edited by: Mariya Likhachyova
- Music by: Oleg Karpachev
- Production companies: Central Partnership; Group of Companies Gpm Kit; Non-Stop Productions
- Distributed by: Central Partnership
- Release date: April 15, 2021
- Running time: 136 minutes
- Country: Russia
- Language: Russian
- Budget: ₽690 million

Chernobyl: Abyss (Russian: Чернобыль), also titled Chernobyl 1986, is a 2021 Russian disaster film directed by and starring Danila Kozlovsky. The film centres on a fictionalised firefighter who becomes a liquidator during the Chernobyl disaster. The film was released in Russia by Central Partnership on 15 April 2021, and was subsequently picked up by Netflix in July 2021.

The soundtrack to the film was recorded by Alla Pugacheva.

== Plot ==
The year is 1986, and 30-year old Pripyat firefighter Alexey Karpushin has begun to reconnect with a former lover, local hairdresser Olga Savostina. Olga reveals to him that he is the father of her 10-year-old son. Their growing romance falters when Alexey fails to turn up for a picnic with Olga and their son, and Olga tells him never to visit again. Alexey applies to be reassigned to Kyiv for a fresh start and is just about to leave when the explosion at the nearby Chernobyl power plant occurs, and instead, he boards a fire truck heading to reactor number 4.

Alexey survives the radiation exposure in the initial fight to control the fire. As the scale of the disaster becomes apparent, the potential for an even greater catastrophe is identified – a secondary steam explosion of a large water reservoir, which lies beneath the melting reactor, and that would eject enormous quantities of radioactive core material into the upper atmosphere, placing the European continent in danger. Alexey has experience of fire inspections on the corridors that lie underneath nuclear reactors. He is reluctant to volunteer for what will likely be a suicide mission, manually to drain the water reservoir before the reactor collapses into it. Alexey then learns that his son is suffering from radiation exposure and is at risk of dying. He agrees to join the team on the basis that his son will be sent to Switzerland for treatment.

After an unsuccessful first attempt, Alexey is convinced by his teammate Valera to make a second attempt to drain the water reservoir. During the successful second attempt, Valera is trapped but cuts the connecting rig for Alexey to escape without him. Alexey refuses to abandon Valera, and as the water is drained, the rescuers find Alexey in a severely irradiated state. He is reunited with Olga in the hospital who embraces him before he dies. Three months later, his son returns after his treatment in Switzerland.

== Cast ==
- Danila Kozlovsky as Alexey Karpushin, rescue worker and firefighter
- Oksana Akinshina as Olga Savostina, a hairdresser
- Filipp Avdeyev as Valery "Valera" Goncharuk, engineer
- Ravshana Kurkova as Dina, a radiologist
- Nikolay Kozak as Colonel Boris Bobylin, a military diver
- Maksim Blinov as Nikita
- Igor Chernevich as Tropin
- Artur Beschastnyy as Mikhail Stysin
- Samvel Tadevosian as Tigran, firefighter
- Dmitry Matveyev as Yura Kondratyuk, fireman Ura
- Aleksandr Alyabyev as Ivan
- Nikolay Samsonov as Kolya, a firefighter Nick
- Pavel Davydov as Semen, liquidator
- Nikita Karpinsky as Dmitry, firefighter

== Production ==
Alexander Rodnyansky, who had filmed the aftermath of the Chernobyl disaster, carried a "career-long ambition" to make a film on the events he witnessed. In 2015, on receiving a script for "Chernobyl 1986", Rodnyansky sent it to Danila Kozlovsky, who was then on the set of Vikings. Kozlovsky was initially dismissive but told the New York Times, that the more he read the script "the more I understood that this was an incredible event that influenced the history of our country, which is still a rather complex topic". Recognizing the impact of the 2019 television drama, Chernobyl and its detailed chronicle and exposure of the failings of the Soviet system, Rodnyansky and Kozlovsky instead sought to focus on the human story, particularly on the liquidators, whose individual heroism prevented the disaster escalating even further at great cost to them. The film was partly funded by the Russian State through the Cinema Foundation.

== Release ==
The film was released in Russia on 15 April 2021 by Central Partnership. North American distribution rights were acquired by Capelight Pictures, and it was added to the Netflix platform in July 2021.

== Reception ==
At its initial Russian release, Chris Brown in CBC News called the film a "missed opportunity", and that it "downplayed the misconduct and lies that Soviet authorities told in an effort to conceal the extent of the disaster". Reviewing its subsequent July release on Netflix, Mark Beaumont in the NME called the film: "a classic disaster movie; World Trade Center in scale and Titanic in execution", and forgave some of its fictionalized handling and lack of overt criticism of the Soviet system as saying "Hollywood has spent decades rewriting history – should we really chastise others for doing the same?". Valerie Hopkins in the New York Times wrote: "Whereas the HBO approach was to dissect systemic flaws in the Soviet system that led to the disaster, the Russian film does something familiar to the country's cultural tradition: emphasizing the role of the individual, people's personal heroism and dedication to a higher cause".

== See also ==
- Chernobyl, 2019 television series
- Cultural impact of the Chernobyl disaster
- Fukushima 50, 2020 Japanese film
- Individual involvement in the Chernobyl disaster
- List of Chernobyl-related articles
