= Ksenia Sereda =

Russian cinematographer

- Ксения Середа
- Born: August 24, 1994 (age 31); Moscow, Russia
- Occupation: Cinematographer
- Years active: 2014–present
- Notable work: Beanpole; The Last of Us; Chernobyl: Abyss
- Website: www.ksenia-sereda.com

Ksenia Sereda (Russian: Ксения Валерьевна Середа; born August 24, 1994) is a Russian cinematographer, known for her work on the film Beanpole (2019) and the television series The Last of Us (2023–present). She won the Asia Pacific Screen Award for Best Cinematographer for Beanpole in 2019. According to film producer Alexander Rodnyansky, Ksenia Sereda has become a symbol of the feminization of the cinematography profession in Russia.

== Career ==
Ksenia Sereda was born in Moscow, Russia, on August 24, 1994. As a schoolgirl, she developed an interest in photography, attending a photography club at the Moscow Palace of Pioneers. She graduated from the Gerasimov Institute of Cinematography (VGIK) in 2017, studying under Yuri Nevsky. Her early works include the documentary for the Gogol Center’s play Who Is Happy in Russia? (2015), the film Acid (2018) by Alexander Gorchilin, which won the Best Debut at the Kinotavr Film Festival, and the series Call DiCaprio! (2018) by Zhora Kryzhovnikov.

In 2019, Sereda served as the cinematographer for the film Beanpole, directed by Kantemir Balagov, which premiered at the Cannes Film Festival and was selected as Russia's entry for the Academy Award for Best International Feature Film at the 92nd Academy Awards. For her work on Beanpole, Sereda won the Asia Pacific Screen Award for Best Cinematographer, becoming the first woman to receive this award. She was also included in IndieWire's list of "20 Cinematographers You Should Know at Cannes 2019".

She later worked on the film Chernobyl: Abyss (2021), directed by Danila Kozlovsky. In 2021, Sereda was invited by showrunner Craig Mazin to serve as the cinematographer for the pilot episode of the HBO series The Last of Us, directed by Balagov. Although Balagov left the project due to creative differences, Sereda continued, shooting the first, second, and seventh episodes of the first season. The series received critical acclaim for its cinematic adaptation of the video game. Sereda returned as the lead director of photography for the second season, working on the first, third, fifth, and sixth episodes. She developed custom lenses with Arri, each engraved with a pink Firefly logo.

Sereda worked on the 2023 series The Crowded Room, directed by Kornel Mundruczo, and the 2024 film Rob Peace, directed by Chiwetel Ejiofor.

== Selected filmography ==
- Little Bird (2014)
- Acid (2018)
- Call DiCaprio! (2018)
- Beanpole (2019)
- Chernobyl: Abyss (2021)
- Mama, I'm Home (2021)
- The Last of Us (2023–present)
- The Crowded Room (2023)
- Rob Peace (2024)

== Awards and nominations ==
Year	Award	Category	Work	Result	Ref.
2014	Movement Film Festival	Best Cinematography	Without Skin	Won	
2019	Asia Pacific Screen Award	Best Cinematographer	Beanpole	Won	
2019	White Elephant	Best Cinematographer	Beanpole	Won	
2020	Nika Award	Best Cinematographer	Beanpole	Nominated	
2020	Golden Eagle Award	Best Cinematography	Beanpole	Nominated	
