= Keivonn Woodard =

American actor

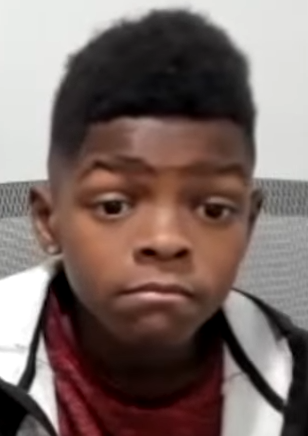
- Woodard in 2022
- Born: Keivonn Montreal Woodard; February 9, 2013 (age 13)
- Occupation: Actor
- Years active: 2018–present

Keivonn Montreal Woodard (born February 9, 2013) is an American actor. He is best known for his role as Sam in the HBO post-apocalyptic drama series The Last of Us (2023), for which he was nominated for a Primetime Emmy Award for Outstanding Guest Actor in a Drama Series.

== Career ==
Woodard made his film debut in 2018 with the film Seeds of Hope: The Andrew Jackson Foster Story. He received wider recognition and critical acclaim for his performance in the HBO post-apocalyptic drama series The Last of Us. Woodard starred as Sam, a survivor who travels with his brother Henry in the episodes "Please Hold to My Hand" and "Endure and Survive".

Woodard, who is Deaf, was hired for The Last of Us after series co-creator Craig Mazin sent a casting call out via Twitter, looking for a young actor fluent in American Sign Language. For his role in the series, Woodard was nominated for the Primetime Emmy Award for Outstanding Guest Actor in a Drama Series, becoming the youngest nominee in the category at age 10 and the second-youngest Emmy nominee after Keshia Knight Pulliam for The Cosby Show. He is the first black deaf actor and second deaf actor overall (after Marlee Matlin) to be nominated for an Emmy Award. He won an Independent Spirit Award and was nominated for a Black Reel TV Award and an NAACP Image Award. In August 2024, Woodard was an honoree of Time's Kid of the Year.

Woodard appeared in Fractal, a short film by Anslem Richardson. In 2024, it was announced that he would star in Steal Away, a feature film directed by Stephen Ashley Blake.

== Personal life ==
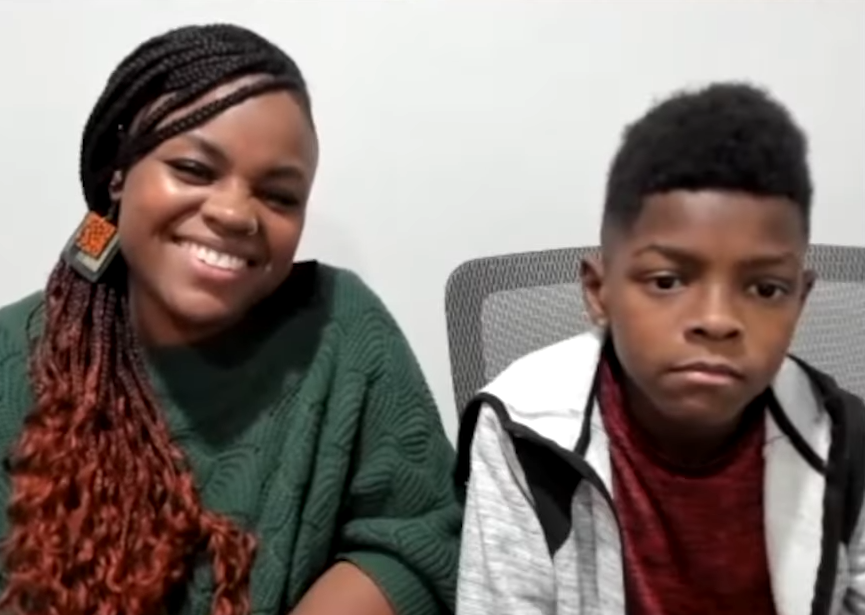
Woodard with his mother April in December 2022

Woodard was born on February 9, 2013. He plays ice hockey in his personal life, and lives in Bowie, Maryland, with his mother, April Jackson-Woodard; his father, Dwayne Woodard, died in 2021.

== Filmography ==
=== Film ===
Year	Title	Role	Notes
2018	Seeds of Hope: The Andrew Jackson Foster Story	Deaf student	Film debut
2024	Fractal	Tamir	Short film

=== Television ===
Year	Title	Role	Notes
2023	The Last of Us	Sam	2 episodes
2024	Bunk'd	Miles	Episode 160: "Slapshot to the Heart"
