= When You're Lost in the Darkness =

- The Last of Us episode
- Joel, Tommy, and Sarah flee through a large crowd. The driving sequence was filmed over four weeks with hundreds of extras, and its camerawork was compared to the game.
- Episode no.: Season 1 Episode 1
- Directed by: Craig Mazin
- Written by: Craig Mazin; Neil Druckmann
- Cinematography by: Ksenia Sereda
- Editing by: Timothy A. Good
- Original air date: January 15, 2023
- Running time: 81 minutes

Guest appearances
- Nico Parker as Sarah; John Hannah as Neuman; Merle Dandridge as Marlene; Josh Brener as Murray; Christopher Heyerdahl as Schoenheiss; Brad Leland as Mr. Adler; Marcia Bennett as Mrs. Adler; Brendan Fletcher as Robert; Jerry Wasserman as Abe; Anna Torv as Tess; Gabriel Luna as Tommy Miller

Episode chronology
← Previous —	Next → "Infected"
- The Last of Us season 1

"When You're Lost in the Darkness" is the series premiere of the American post-apocalyptic drama television series The Last of Us. Written by series creators Craig Mazin and Neil Druckmann and directed by Mazin, the episode aired on HBO on January 15, 2023. The first episode of the first season, it introduces Joel (Pedro Pascal) and his daughter Sarah (Nico Parker) during the chaos of a global pandemic outbreak caused by a mutated form of the Cordyceps fungus that turns its victims into bloodthirsty attackers. Twenty years later, Joel and Tess (Anna Torv) set out to find Joel's brother Tommy (Gabriel Luna) and are tasked with smuggling the young Ellie (Bella Ramsey) in exchange for supplies.

The episode's original director, Johan Renck, dropped out due to scheduling conflicts stemming from the COVID-19 pandemic. His successor, Kantemir Balagov, left the project due to creative differences and was replaced by Mazin. "When You're Lost in the Darkness" was originally written as two episodes, which were combined as HBO executives felt the original first episode would not compel viewers to return the following week. Mazin and Druckmann wrote additional scenes to expand the world and encourage viewers to empathize with its characters. Filming for the series began in Calgary, Alberta, in July 2021.

The episode received critical acclaim, with praise for its writing, direction, and performances of Pascal, Ramsey, Parker, and Torv. It was watched by 4.7 million viewers on the first day, and almost 40 million within two months. The episode won Outstanding Sound Mixing and Sound Editing at the 75th Primetime Creative Arts Emmy Awards, and Parker was nominated for Outstanding Guest Performance in a Drama Series at the 7th Annual Black Reel Awards for Television.

== Plot ==
On a television talk show in 1968, epidemiologists Neuman and Schoenheiss discuss the potential of a global pandemic. Neuman suggests fungi are a grave threat given lack of preventative treatment or cure. Schoenheiss points out the impossibility of fungal infection in humans due to fungi's inability to survive body heat. Neuman agrees but notes fungi could evolve to overcome this weakness as the world gets warmer, at which point humanity would not survive.

In 2003, in Austin, Texas, fourteen-year-old Sarah is awoken in the middle of the night and discovers her neighbors attacked by their relative, a once-senile elderly woman. Sarah's father Joel returns with his brother Tommy and kills the woman. As Joel, Tommy, and Sarah flee through crowds, debris from a crashed airplane overturns Tommy's truck. Joel runs while carrying an injured Sarah but gets cornered by a soldier, who shoots at them. Tommy kills the soldier, but Sarah is fatally wounded and dies in Joel's arms.

Twenty years later, in 2023, after the global pandemic of the Cordyceps fungi has destroyed human civilization, Joel lives in a military quarantine zone in Boston, Massachusetts, managed by the Federal Disaster Response Agency (FEDRA). He and his partner Tess smuggle and sell contraband. Joel plans to leave for Wyoming in search of Tommy, with whom he lost contact. Fourteen-year-old Ellie is held by the Fireflies, a resistance group against FEDRA. Their leader, Marlene, reveals she placed Ellie into FEDRA military school as a child for her protection but now plans to transport her west.

Joel and Tess purchase a car battery from Robert but get double-crossed when it is sold to the Fireflies. They find the deal has gone awry, leaving Robert and most Fireflies dead. Marlene begs Joel and Tess to take Ellie to the Massachusetts State House in exchange for supplies; they accept. The trio wait until nightfall to leave. They are caught by a soldier and forced to comply with an infection check. Ellie stabs the soldier in the leg. He threatens to shoot Ellie, reminding Joel of Sarah's death; he beats the soldier to death. Ellie's scan is positive, but she swears she is not infected since she was bitten weeks earlier. Joel, Tess, and Ellie enter a biological contamination area in Boston's commercial district to flee pursuing soldiers as the infected lurk in the distance.

== Production ==
=== Conception and writing ===
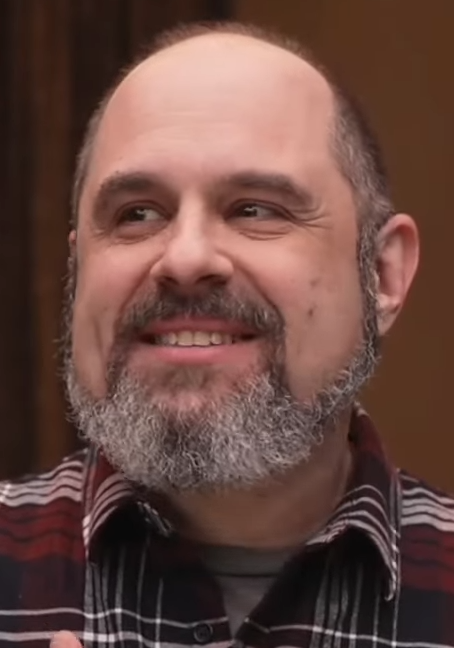
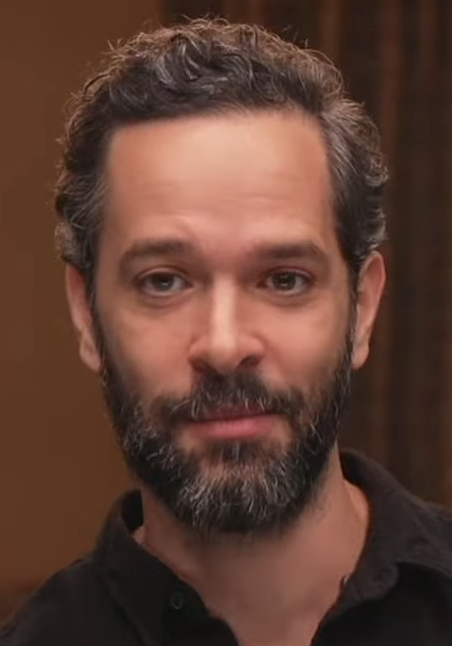
The episode was written by series creators Craig Mazin (left) and Neil Druckmann (right), and directed by Mazin.

The Last of Us was created by Craig Mazin and Neil Druckmann, based on the 2013 video game which Druckmann wrote and creative directed. A television adaptation was announced in the planning stages at HBO in March 2020, and the series was greenlit in November. Johan Renck, Mazin's collaborator on Chernobyl (2019), was announced as executive producer and director of the pilot episode in June 2020; he dropped out by November due to scheduling conflicts as a result of the COVID-19 pandemic. He was replaced as director in January 2021 by Kantemir Balagov, who had been interested in adapting the game for years and was set to direct the first few episodes. In October 2022, Balagov said he left the project a year prior due to creative differences and his work would not be featured in the show; after it aired, he said around 40% of the first 40 minutes was his work. The Directors Guild of Canada revealed Mazin was assigned to direct an episode in August 2021, later revealed to be the pilot. Mazin and Druckmann wrote the episode. Rotten Tomatoes revealed its title in December 2022.

"When You're Lost in the Darkness" was originally written as two episodes; the first would have ended shortly after the 20-year time jump. HBO and HBO Max chairman and chief content officer Casey Bloys felt the original first episode would not compel viewers to return the following week, particularly due to the limited usage of Ellie, and suggested combining the two. Mazin was initially worried by the suggestion and lamented the loss of some scenes, but trusted Bloys's instinct and ultimately felt it was the right decision. Mazin pitched the episode's cold open to Druckmann twice. Their original idea was to create their own version of an educational clip from the documentary series Planet Earth (2006), which had inspired the game, but they found it boring. The concept of the television talk show was inspired by The Dick Cavett Show; Mazin wrote the script as if he had encountered a transcript from a 1969 episode. Druckmann was initially hesitant but became open to the idea as main production was nearing its end. He found it effective both as an educational introduction and a contextualization of future events, particularly to fans of the game to which the open is a deviation. Mazin considered it a reference to the COVID-19 pandemic, demonstrating to viewers that similar viruses have occurred before and likely will again. He borrowed this approach from his work in writing Chernobyl, implying humanity knew of the potential risk for some time. The design of the talk show set was inspired by the television shows hosted by Dick Cavett and David Susskind.

Druckmann was open to changing any aspects of the games but always wanted a strong reason, ensuring he and Mazin considered the impacts on events later in the narrative. The game's outbreak takes place in 2013 (the same year the original game was released), while its post-apocalyptic narrative occurs in 2033; this was changed to 2003 and 2023, as the writers felt the latter story taking place simultaneously with the show's release was more interesting and real, and did not fundamentally change the story. Mazin and Druckmann wrote additional scenes with Sarah to allow viewers to empathize with her, imitating the game's opening gameplay sequence wherein players briefly assume control of Sarah. Brief scenes were written to imply her personality and make viewers question her future had she survived. Druckmann found the demonstration of an outbreak from a child's perspective unique. The writers experimented with different reasons for Joel to leave Sarah in their house; they found Tommy being in jail allowed them to build the world and characters simultaneously. Mazin blocked Sarah's death similar to the game to remind players of the scene; Gabriel Luna similarly drew inspiration from the "physical geometry" of Jeffrey Pierce's in-game portrayal of Tommy.

=== Casting and characters ===
Casting took place virtually through Zoom due to the COVID-19 pandemic. Pedro Pascal and Bella Ramsey were cast as Joel and Ellie on February 10, 2021. The producers primarily sought actors who could embody Joel and Ellie individually as well as imitate their relationship. Pascal and Ramsey did not meet before filming began but found they had instant chemistry which developed over the course of production. Pascal was cast as Joel due to his ability to portray a tough, tortured, and vulnerable character who suppresses his emotions until necessary. A non-gamer, Pascal watched his nephew play the beginning of the first game because he lacked the skill to play it himself; he found Joel to be "so impressive" but was concerned about imitating the games too closely, instead choosing to "create a healthy distance" and allow the showrunners to decide the characterization. More than 100 actors had been considered for Ellie; the producers sought a performer who could portray a resourceful, quirky, and potentially violent character. Ramsey was encouraged not to play the game after their audition to avoid replicating the original performance, instead watching some gameplay on YouTube to "get a sense of it". Ramsey, who is English, learned an American accent for the role.

Nico Parker's casting as Sarah was announced on June 30, 2021. Parker watched videos of the game years before getting the role. She wanted to "stay away from the game version" and provide her own interpretation of the character; she felt intimidated at the prospect of portraying Sarah's death due to its impact in the game. Parker and Pascal did little rehearsal of Sarah's death as they wanted to "savor" the feeling. Pascal felt an instant bond with Parker, with whom he filmed scenes first. Luna's casting as Tommy was announced on April 15, 2021. He was enthusiastic for the role, having lived in Austin, Texas around the same time as the show's setting. Luna approached the role similar to a biopic, reasoning Tommy had a ten-year history for fans of the game, and elected to translate elements of Pierce's original performance he considered important to himself and fans. Merle Dandridge was confirmed to reprise her role of Marlene from the video games on May 27. Anna Torv's casting as Tess was announced on July 22.

=== Music ===
The episode's early scenes use the songs "Tomorrow" by Avril Lavigne and "White Flag" by Dido. Stylist's Kayleigh Dray suggested the lyrics of "Tomorrow" foreshadowed Sarah's fate, while "White Flag" added a hopeful message, signifying Joel refusing to give up despite his struggles. The episode's final scene and credits feature the song "Never Let Me Down Again" by Depeche Mode; Mazin chose the song due to its blend of upbeat sounds and dark lyrics. He felt its title referred to the relationship between Joel and Ellie, and noted it would recur later in the season in a different manner. The song topped two Billboard charts in the week preceding January 28: LyricFind U.S., due to a 999% increase in lyric searches and usage; and LyricFind Global, a 182% increase. It charted seventh on the Alternative Digital Song Sales and eighteenth on Rock Digital Song Sales, following 1,000 downloads (a 1,199% increase) and 552,000 streams (210% increase) in the United States, ranked seventh on Billboard's Top TV Songs chart for January, and saw a more than 520% increase in global streams on Spotify.

=== Filming ===
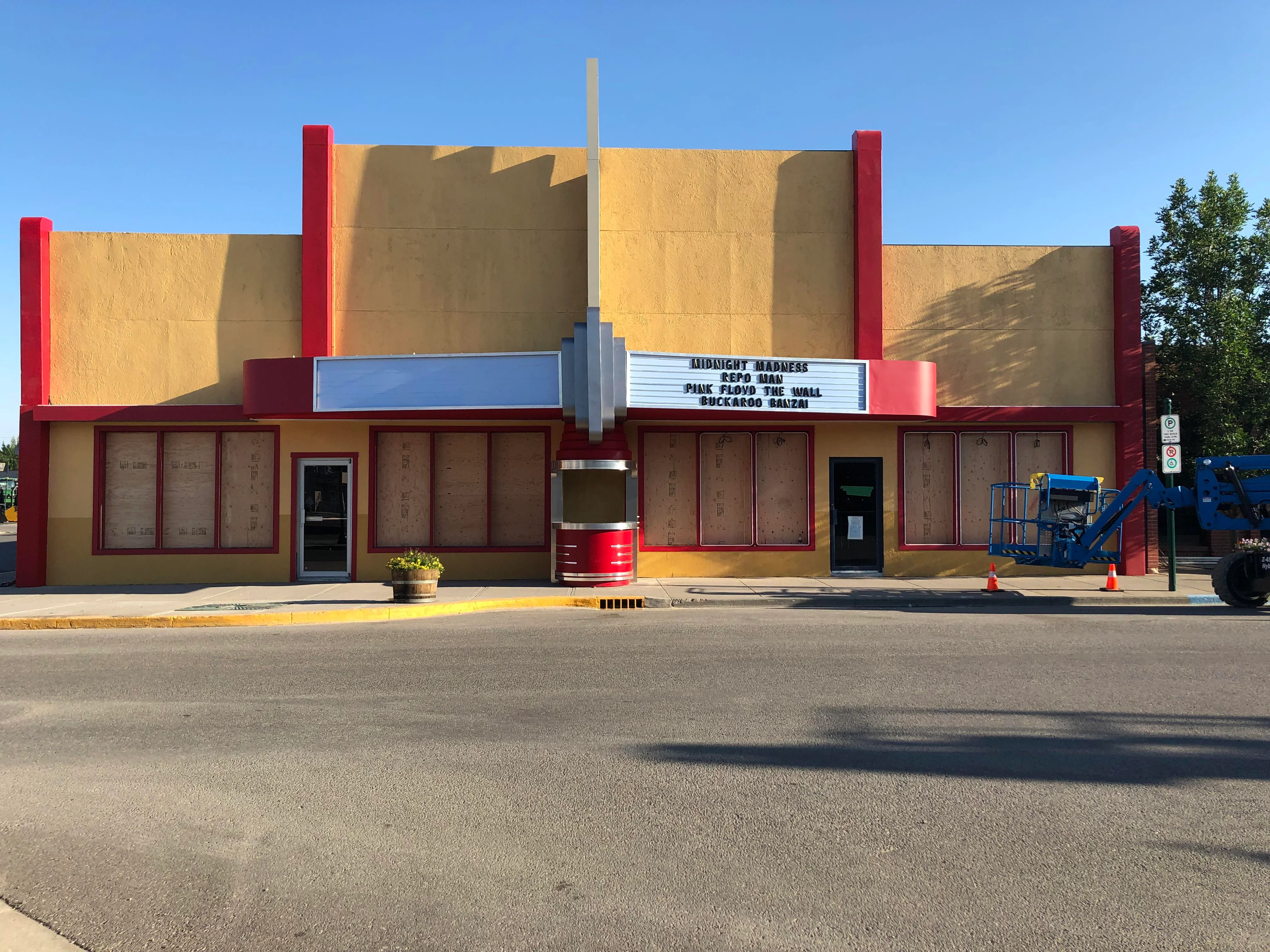
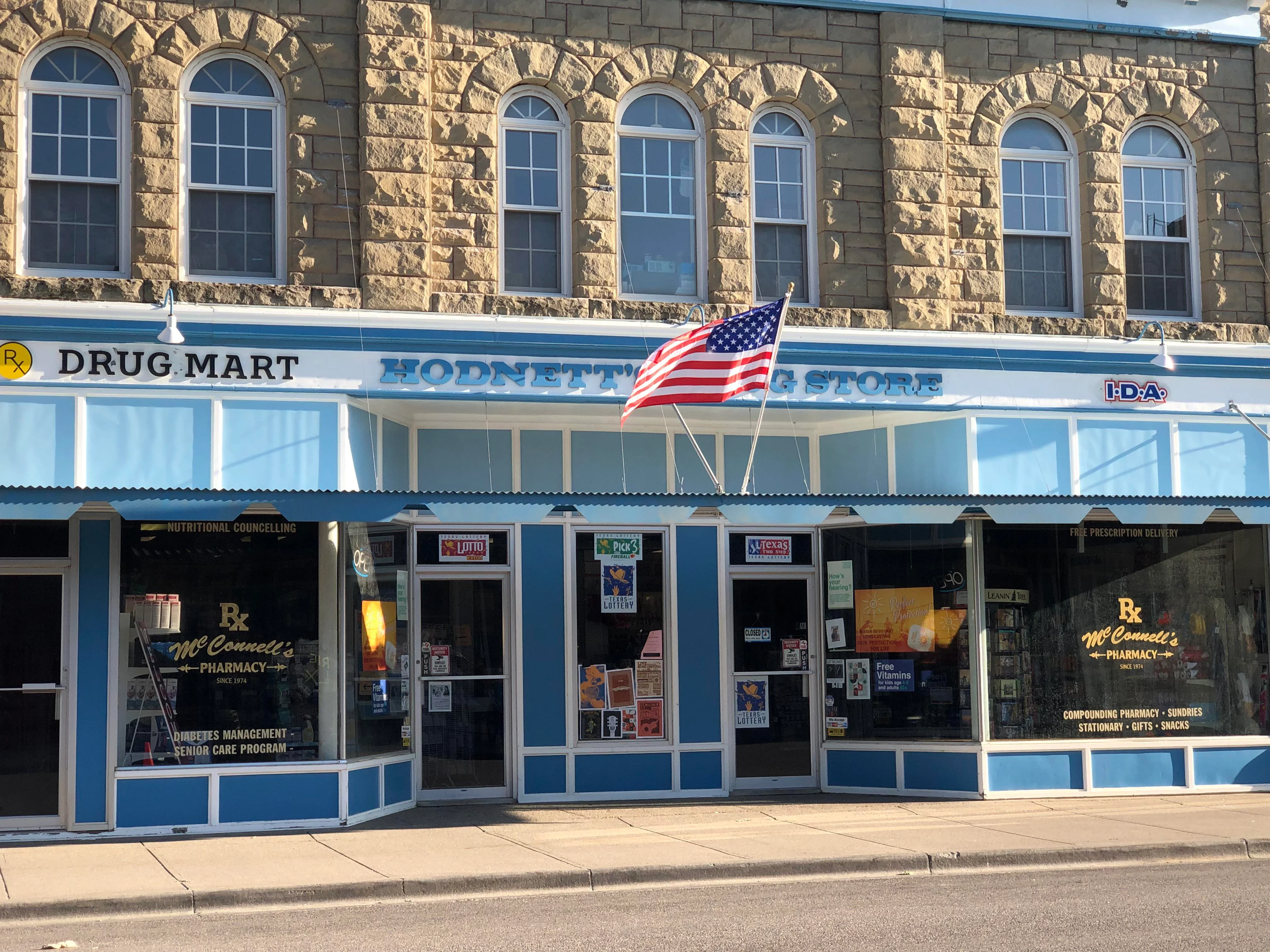
Filming took place in Fort Macleod in July 2021, including the driving sequences.

Ksenia Sereda was the episode's cinematographer. Members of the cast and crew arrived in Calgary in June 2021; Balagov posted an image of himself and Pascal in Calgary on June 29, and Luna posted the first photo from set alongside Balagov, Pascal, Parker, and Sereda on July 2. Filming began in Calgary, Alberta, on July 12, a week later than originally scheduled. Filming took place in High River in the evenings of July 13–19, including some driving scenes requiring traffic detours. The town was used for Joel and Sarah's cul-de-sac, the buildings through which they flee the infected, and the burning house they drive past. The shoot at the cul-de-sac took several days due to the choreography and special effects required. Production designer John Paino found several Canadian towns had similarities to American architecture, particularly Texas. Some trees were wrapped in different types of bark as the large Canadian fir trees did not resemble Texas. Lord Shaughnessy and Western Canada High Schools were used for the exterior and interior, respectively, of Sarah's school, and Evelyn's Memory Lane Diner in High River was used in the chase sequence; the latter's owner was a fan of the games.

Technical rehearsals in the town of Fort Macleod took place in the evenings of May 20 and June 18, 2021, requiring the closure of Main Street. Preparations in the town took place from July 5–12, including polling businesses and residents; storefronts were changed to fit the show. Production moved to Fort Macleod from July 19–24; The driving sequences were filmed at night over four weeks in Fort Macleod, using hundreds of extras; several background actors crafted their own brief stories and moments. Filming required a mount in which a stunt driver controls movement from a dune buggy atop the vehicle, allowing Sereda full movement in the back. The sequence was written in the script as a long take. Mazin considered the sequence difficult to film, partly due to the limited hours of darkness in Fort Macleod; the cast and crew rehearsed from 9 p.m. to 11:30 p.m., and filmed until around 4:30 a.m. Mazin and Druckmann continued adding minor elements to set dressing until minutes before filming. The plane crash was achieved by flashing powerful lights at the camera to mimic the effect of an explosion. The actors and crew were instructed not to look directly at the lights to avoid damaging their eyes. Parker found filming the chase scene immersive and frightening due to the use of practical effects, allowing her to react in real-time.

Production returned to High River in the evening of July 29 to the following morning, with the filming of a traffic jam requiring the closure of a highway interchange and rerouting of traffic. Filming moved to Calgary in August. Paino was unable to locate empty and abandoned locations for production in Canada despite his expectations, requiring his team to build the Boston quarantine zone; three blocks near Stampede Park were transformed over several months, with some filming occurring elsewhere in Calgary such as Inglewood. The crew looked at the Gaza Strip and slums and council housing in England, France, and India for visual inspiration. Joel and Tess's apartment was designed to imply a loving family had lived there beforehand. Balagov's work on the show had completed production by August 30; he later left the project entirely due to creative differences. By September, Torv was filming in Canada. The crew were granted a budget to reshoot scenes in the episode; additions included Tommy at breakfast and calling Joel from jail at night, which the writers felt allowed a better understanding of the character. Reshoots for Texas scenes took place in Olds in late May and early June, with several local businesses contracted to assist with construction and design; a mural painted for the production, originally scheduled to be removed, was later approved to remain in the town. Reshoots took place in High River in June, which required redressing the set for Joel and Sarah's cul-de-sac.

== Reception ==
=== Broadcast and ratings ===
While the series was originally indicated to begin airing in 2022, Bloys denied this in February 2022 and clarified it would begin in 2023. Following leaks from Sky and HBO Max, on November 2, HBO announced the series would premiere in the United States on January 15, 2023. The first episode received its red carpet world premiere in Westwood, Los Angeles on January 9, followed by theater screenings in Budapest and Sydney on January 11, and New York City on January 12. The episode had 4.7 million viewers in the United States on its first night of availability, including linear viewers and streams on HBO Max, making it the second-largest debut for HBO since 2010 behind House of the Dragon. That figure increased to over 10 million viewers after two days, 18 million after a week, 22 million within twelve days, and almost 40 million within two months. It was streamed for a total of 223 million minutes in its first three hours. On linear television, it had 588,000 viewers on its first night, with a 0.17 ratings share. In Latin America, the series premiere was the biggest HBO Max debut ever. In the United Kingdom, the video games increased their sales following the premiere: The Last of Us Remastered by 322% over the previous week and The Last of Us Part I by 238%, with both reentering the charts as a result. On January 27, the episode was released for free on HBO Max in the United States, and on Sky's YouTube channel in the United Kingdom.

=== Critical response ===
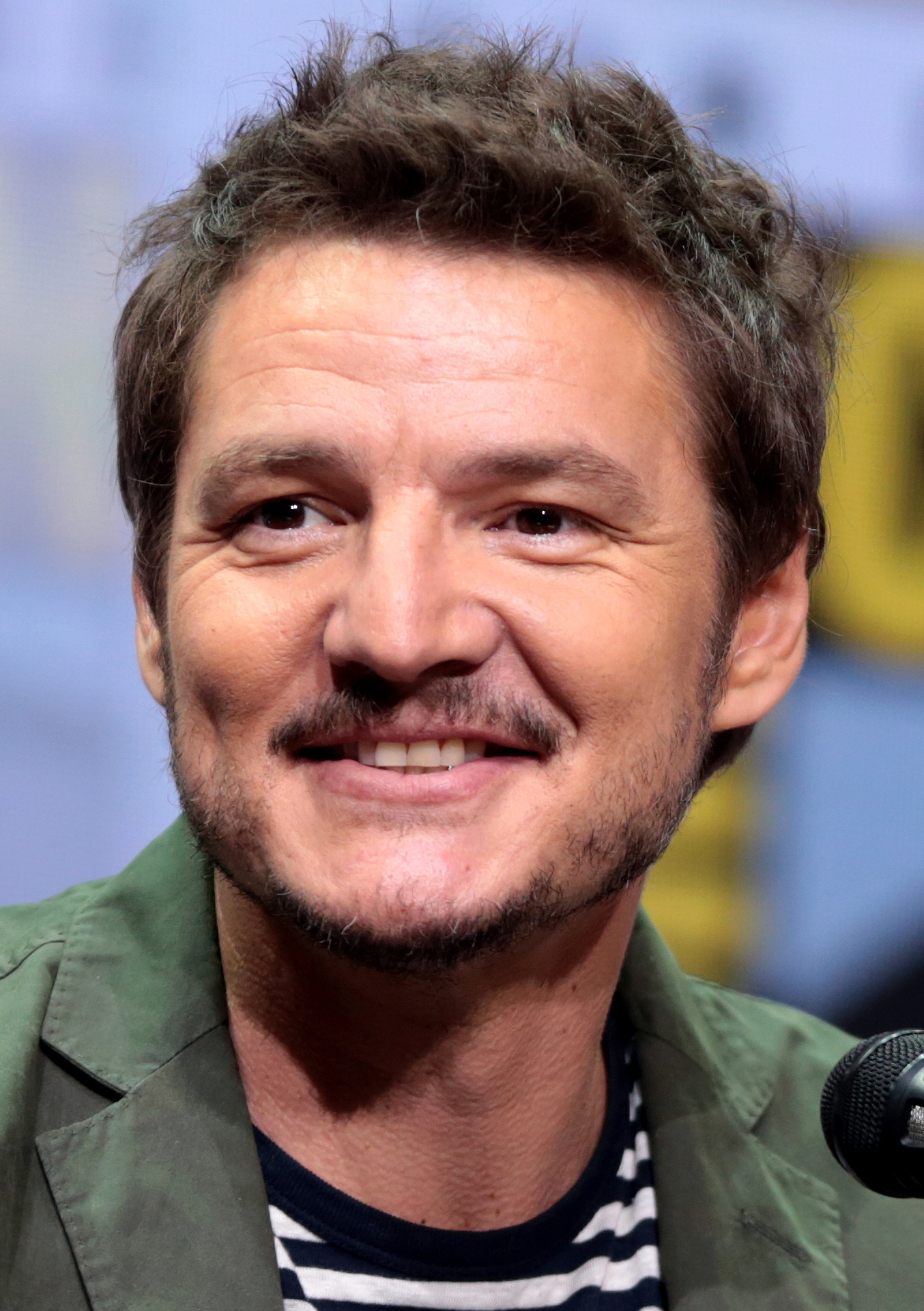
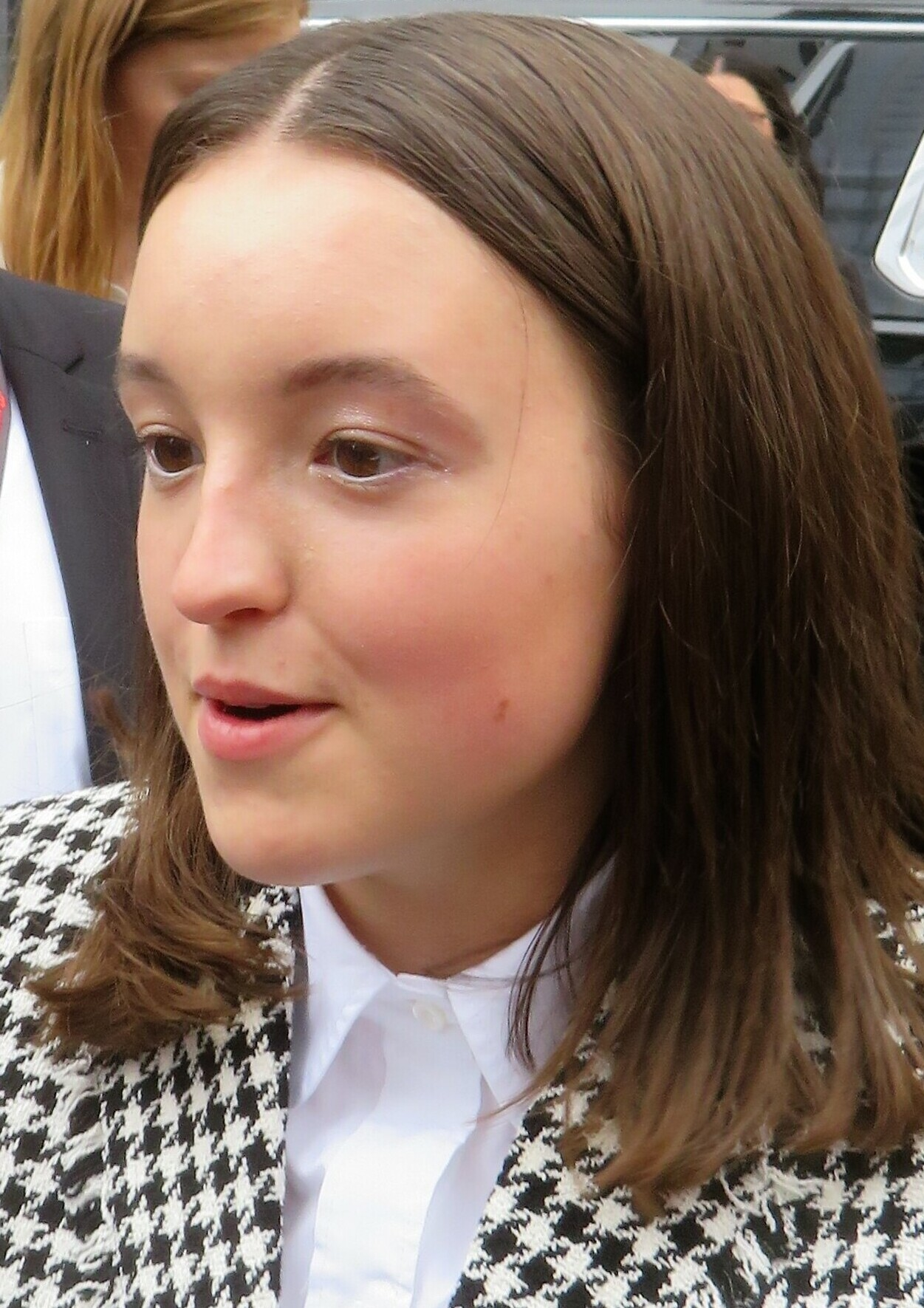
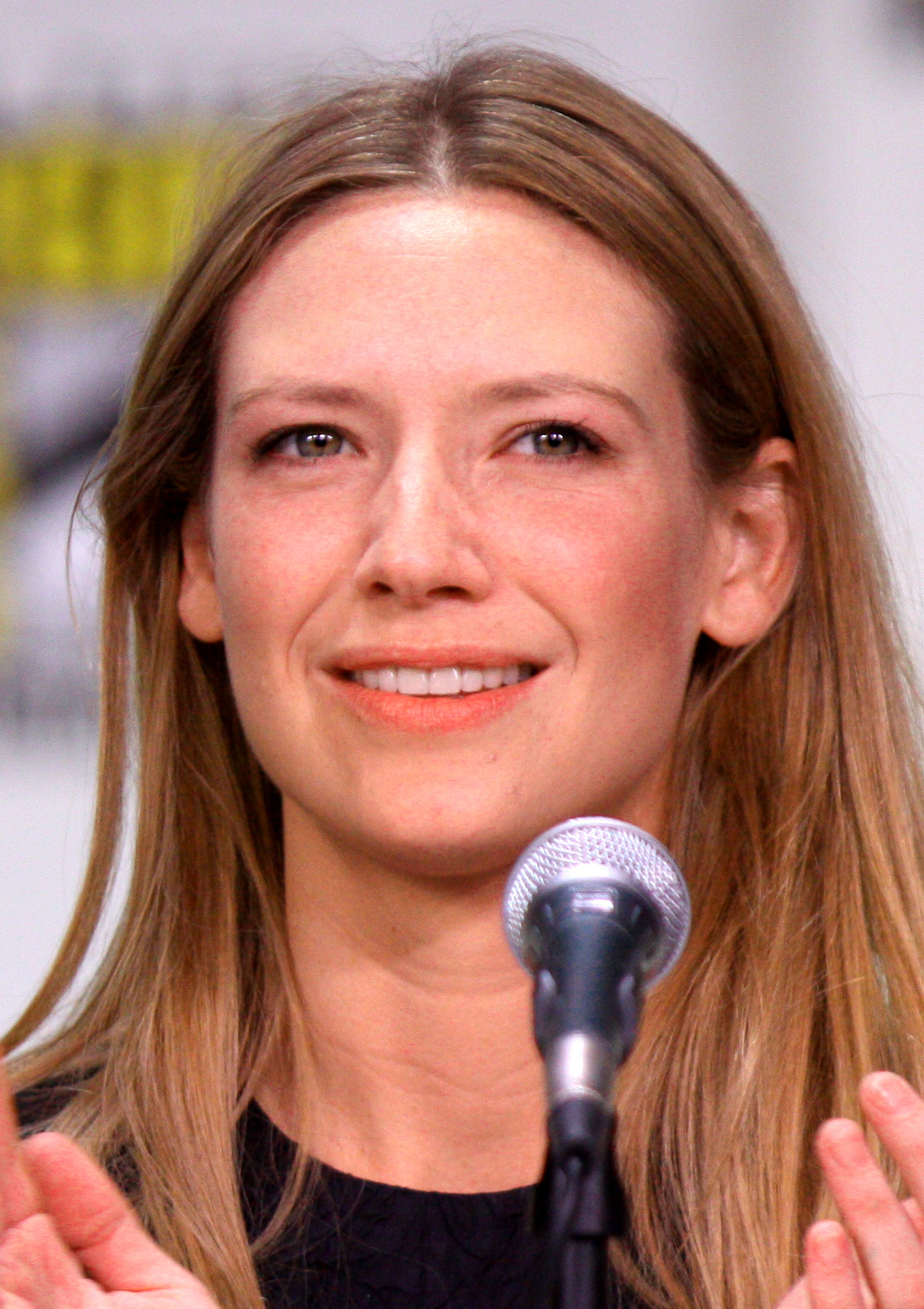
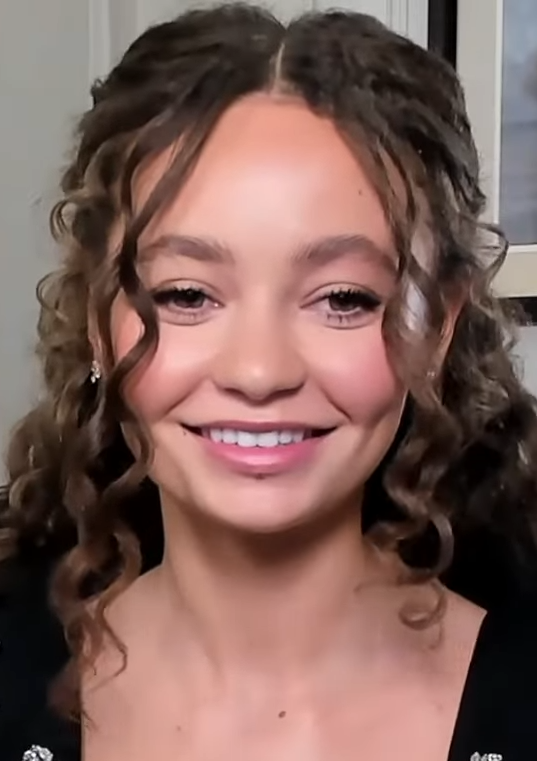
Critics praised the performances of Pedro Pascal, Bella Ramsey (top), Anna Torv, and Nico Parker (bottom).

On review aggregator Rotten Tomatoes, "When You're Lost in the Darkness" has an approval rating of 100% based on 40 reviews, with an average rating of 8.9/10. The website's critical consensus called the episode "a haunting premiere that benefits immeasurably from Nico Parker's endearing contribution". Critics praised the cast performances, particularly Pascal, Ramsey, Torv, and Parker. GameSpot's Mark Delaney lauded Pascal's ability to stir emotions in portraying different sides of Joel before and after the outbreak. Push Square's Aaron Bayne found Pascal reflected Joel's torment without speaking, and Den of Geek's Bernard Boo felt Torv matched Pascal's nuance. Kotaku Australia's David Smith called Ramsey "perhaps the pilot's greatest triumph", especially in their scenes with Pascal. TVLine named Parker an honorable mention for Performer of the Week; Rolling Stone's Alan Sepinwall lauded her performance for establishing Sarah as likeable, and wrote that John Hannah's performance "sells the innate fear" of the infection. Den of Geek's Boo felt each actor "brought their own take on the material".

MovieWeb's Julian Roman praised Mazin and Druckmann's writing in the opening act, particularly due to the intensity granted through Sarah's perspective. In the Open Library of Humanities Journal, Robert Yeates argued the cold open introduces a critique of global capitalism's effects on climate change. Den of Geek's Boo found it contextualized the narrative in a meaningful manner, and IndieWire's Steve Greene called it "a deft bit of TV framing" to make the viewer both confident and anxious, though found some rushed worldbuilding awkward. IGN's Simon Cardy similarly considered some introductions rushed but otherwise enjoyed the episode's pacing. Total Film's Bradley Russell wrote the second half "feels like a safer pilot" in comparison to its relentless first half. Variety's Daniel D'Addario compared the episode to Mazin's Chernobyl and wrote it demonstrated his gift "for demonstrating the breakdown of processes". Push Square's Bayne found the episode immersive and emotional despite his familiarity with the story. Inverse's Dais Johnston felt expanding the game's prologue allowed viewers to more closely empathize with Sarah.

Several critics praised Mazin's direction and Sereda's cinematography; Total Film's Russell felt following Sarah's perspective emphasized the narrative's "suffocating tone". Several journalists compared the camerawork to the video game; IGN's Cardy applauded its usage to frame Sarah's viewpoint. Conversely, /Film's Valerie Ettenhofer felt the shaky handheld footage lessened the impact of the world's introduction and considered the episode the season's weakest. IndieWire's Greene noted Mazin's technique of telling stories in the background effectively added tension. The Hollywood Reporter's Daniel Fienberg called the episode "proficiently made" but found it "too familiar for [its] running time to sustain", noting it failed to reflect the video game's importance to new audiences. Rolling Stone's Sepinwall, who did not play the game, echoed this sentiment, but said the episode improved when Mazin stopped attempting to imitate the game's visual language. Den of Geek's Boo praised the production design for its authenticity to the game. Total Film's Russell wrote the score was used to "intensify, but never overpower, the ... emotional beats".

=== Accolades ===
The episode won Outstanding Sound Mixing (Note: Nominees: re-recording mixers Marc Fishman and Kevin Roache; and production mixer Michael Playfair) and Outstanding Sound Editing (Note: Nominees: supervising sound editor Michael J. Benavente; dialogue editor Joe Schiff; sound designers Christopher Battaglia and Chris Terhune; sound effects editors Mitchell Lestner, Jacob Flack, and Matt Yocum; music editor Maarten Hofmeijer; supervising Foley editor Randy Wilson; Foley editors Justin Hele and David Aquino; and Foley artists Stefan Fraticelli, Jason Charbonneau, and William Kellerman) at the 75th Primetime Creative Arts Emmy Awards and Outstanding Achievement in Sound Mixing for Television Series (Note: Nominees: Michael Playfair, Marc Fishman, Kevin Roache, Randy Wilson) at the Cinema Audio Society Awards 2023. It was nominated for Outstanding Achievement in Sound Editing (Note: Nominees: Michael J. Benavente, Chris Battaglia, Chris Terhune, Mitchell Lestner, Matt Yocum, Randy Wilson, Davi Aquino, Justin Hale, Justin Charbonneau, Stefan Fraticelli, William Kellerman) at the Golden Reel Awards 2023, where Maarten Hofmeijer won Outstanding Achievement in Music Editing. Parker was nominated for Outstanding Guest Performance in a Drama Series at the 7th Annual Black Reel Awards for Television.
