= Infected (The Last of Us) =

- The Last of Us episode
- The infection is spread to Tess via mouth. The scene was written and filmed like a kiss to underscore the theme of love. It sparked both positive and negative responses.
- Episode no.: Season 1 Episode 2
- Directed by: Neil Druckmann
- Written by: Craig Mazin
- Cinematography by: Ksenia Sereda
- Editing by: Mark Hartzell
- Original air date: January 22, 2023
- Running time: 53 minutes

Guest appearances
- Anna Torv as Tess; Christine Hakim as Ratna Pertiwi; Yayu A.W. Unru as Lt. Gen. Agus Hidayat

Episode chronology
← Previous "When You're Lost in the Darkness"	Next → "Long, Long Time"
- The Last of Us season 1

"Infected" is the second episode of the first season of the American post-apocalyptic drama television series The Last of Us. It was written and directed by series creators Craig Mazin and Neil Druckmann, respectively; Druckmann wrote and co-directed the 2013 video game on which the series is based. The episode aired on HBO on January 22, 2023. In the episode, Joel (Pedro Pascal) and his partner Tess (Anna Torv) escort the young Ellie (Bella Ramsey) through a biological contamination area in Boston to reach the Massachusetts State House.

"Infected" was Druckmann's first experience in directing television; he found it reinforced and reflected his experience in directing video games. The episode introduced "clickers", mutated creatures who rely on sound to move, designed using prosthetics with the game's concept art as reference material. Filming for the episode took place in October and November 2021, in Calgary and Edmonton, Alberta; a four-day shoot in the latter cost around CA$372,000.

The episode received positive reviews, with praise for its writing, direction, production design, and performances, particularly Torv's. It was watched by 5.7 million viewers on the first day. The episode received several nominations at the 75th Primetime Creative Arts Emmy Awards, including Torv for Guest Actress in a Drama Series, and won Outstanding Prosthetic Makeup.

== Plot ==
In 2003, authorities in Jakarta show mycology professor Ratna Pertiwi a sample from a human, which she identifies as Ophiocordyceps. Lieutenant-General Agus Hidayat has Ratna examine the corpse of a woman with a human bite mark on her leg and fungal growths in her mouth. Hidayat tells her the woman worked at a flour factory, and Ratna remarks the location provides an excellent substrate for the fungus. She tells him there is no cure or vaccine, and, acknowledging that the fungus has no chance of being contained, fearfully recommends the entire city be bombed.

In 2023, Joel and Tess hold Ellie at gunpoint and demand to know why they were tasked with escorting her. Ellie reveals the Fireflies have established a secret camp out west with doctors working on a vaccine to prevent infection, and her DNA may be key to ensuring success. Joel demands they return to the quarantine zone but Tess, still skeptical of Ellie's immunity, convinces him to follow through with their arrangement as the Fireflies will still give them supplies.

As the group makes its way towards the Massachusetts State House, Tess discovers a pack of infected blocking their route, explaining to Ellie the fungi can sense uninfected humans across long distances and draw its hosts towards them. Tess suggests going through a museum. A roof cave-in attracts two "clickers", blind mutated hosts who rely on sound to move. Ellie gets bitten and Joel and Tess kill the clickers. Arriving at the State House, they find the Fireflies dead; Joel finds evidence of infection and surmises they killed each other. Tess tries to find clues on where to go next, but Joel tells her the job is finished and they will return home. Tess tells him that she cannot go back, revealing a bite mark on her neck. She reveals Ellie's mark has already healed, proving her immunity.

Joel shoots an infected Firefly who tries to attack them, revealing their location to other infected hosts in the city. Tess tells Joel to take Ellie to fellow smugglers Bill and Frank. She covers the room with gasoline and grenades as Joel and Ellie leave. An infected man begins the process of converting Tess when she ignites the building, killing the creatures. Joel and Ellie watch as the State House explodes before Joel walks away.

== Production ==
=== Conception and writing ===
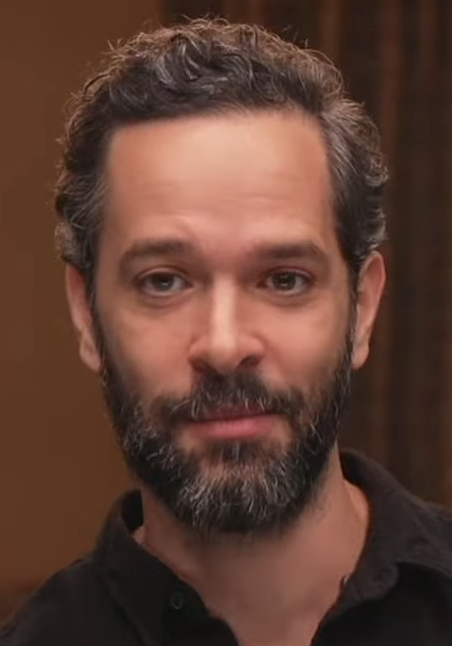
"Infected" was series co-creator Neil Druckmann's first experience in directing television.

The Last of Us series creators Craig Mazin and Neil Druckmann, respectively, wrote and directed "Infected"; Druckmann was the writer and creative director of the video game on which the series is based. The Directors Guild of Canada revealed Druckmann was assigned to direct an episode in September 2021; in February 2022, Druckmann confirmed he directed an episode and said his experience reinforced and reflected his experience directing games. He predicted it would be significantly different but noted several similarities after witnessing Mazin direct the first episode. He found the biggest difference was the inability to make changes after production; in game development, he is able to request changes to factors such as framing, lighting, clothing, environments and weather. He spent over a month preparing as it was his first experience directing television. Pedro Pascal (who portrays Joel) considered Druckmann the most open and excited of the season's directors, and Bella Ramsey (Ellie) found his feedback believable due to his proximity to the source material.

Rotten Tomatoes listed the episode's title in December 2022 as "Cordyceps Ordo Seclorum"; Mazin clarified it was "an early idea" that was later replaced as "it doesn't really make much sense". Joel's glance at Ellie in the final scene was an unscripted addition by Pascal; Druckmann felt it demonstrated Joel's frustration with Ellie, a feeling she returned. Mazin considered ending the episode with Ellie following Joel but Druckmann insisted the ending remain unresolved. The final scene and credits use the song "Allowed to be Happy" by Gustavo Santaolalla, featured in the video game The Last of Us Part II (2020).

An early version of the cold open featured an unseen individual hitting a door, later revealed to be Tess's infected son whom she locked in a basement as she was unable to kill him; it was cut before production as the writers felt it did not fit. Anna Torv and the writers thought Tess's decision to keep Ellie safe was to redeem past actions in her life. Mazin ultimately set the cold open in Indonesia to disorient the audience, a technique he was inspired to use from Vince Gilligan's television work. He found episodic storytelling allowed an opportunity to view the origins of the pandemic and demonstrate its global reach. The original plan was to feature a montage of cities around the world, but they lacked the budget. The writers felt following a single character—and her brief connection with one other character—granted a greater sense of dread and grounded the events in reality. The opening scene uses the song "Hampa" by Ari Lasso.

Mazin wanted the clickers to resemble the in-game design through prosthetics; he felt using visual effects would have lessened their impact. Barrie and Sarah Gower, with whom Mazin had worked on Chernobyl (2019), were engaged to create the prosthetics. Their team found themselves continually referring to the original concept art from the game. The performers of the clickers were fans of the game and understood their movement. The silent conversation between Joel and Ellie was added during reshoots, as executive producer Carolyn Strauss did not understand how clickers operate. In the game, Tess sacrifices herself to provide Joel and Ellie time to escape pursuing soldiers; in the episode, they are replaced with infected. Mazin considered it illogical for soldiers to patrol so far away from the quarantine zone and felt replacing them with infected granted the opportunity to demonstrate the connectivity between the creatures. Mazin felt the kiss between Tess and the infected underscored the theme of love, noting the creatures were still capable of love through their spread of the fungus. Druckmann wanted to frame and light the shot of the kiss in a beautiful way to emphasize its creepiness.

=== Casting and characters ===
Christine Hakim's role was revealed in a trailer in December 2022. She was contacted to appear in the series via Instagram. She was initially hesitant to accept the role as she was caring for her mother and husband amid the COVID-19 pandemic but was convinced by her grandniece, a fan of the game. Her husband reassured her and told her the role "is not only for you, this is for Asia". Hakim recorded her role in Calgary in late October 2021. She brought her traditional batik scarves and Indonesian jewelry, which the costume department accepted for use in the series. Hakim was impressed by Druckmann's ability to direct Indonesian roles and the art director's creation of the Jakarta set in Calgary.

=== Filming ===
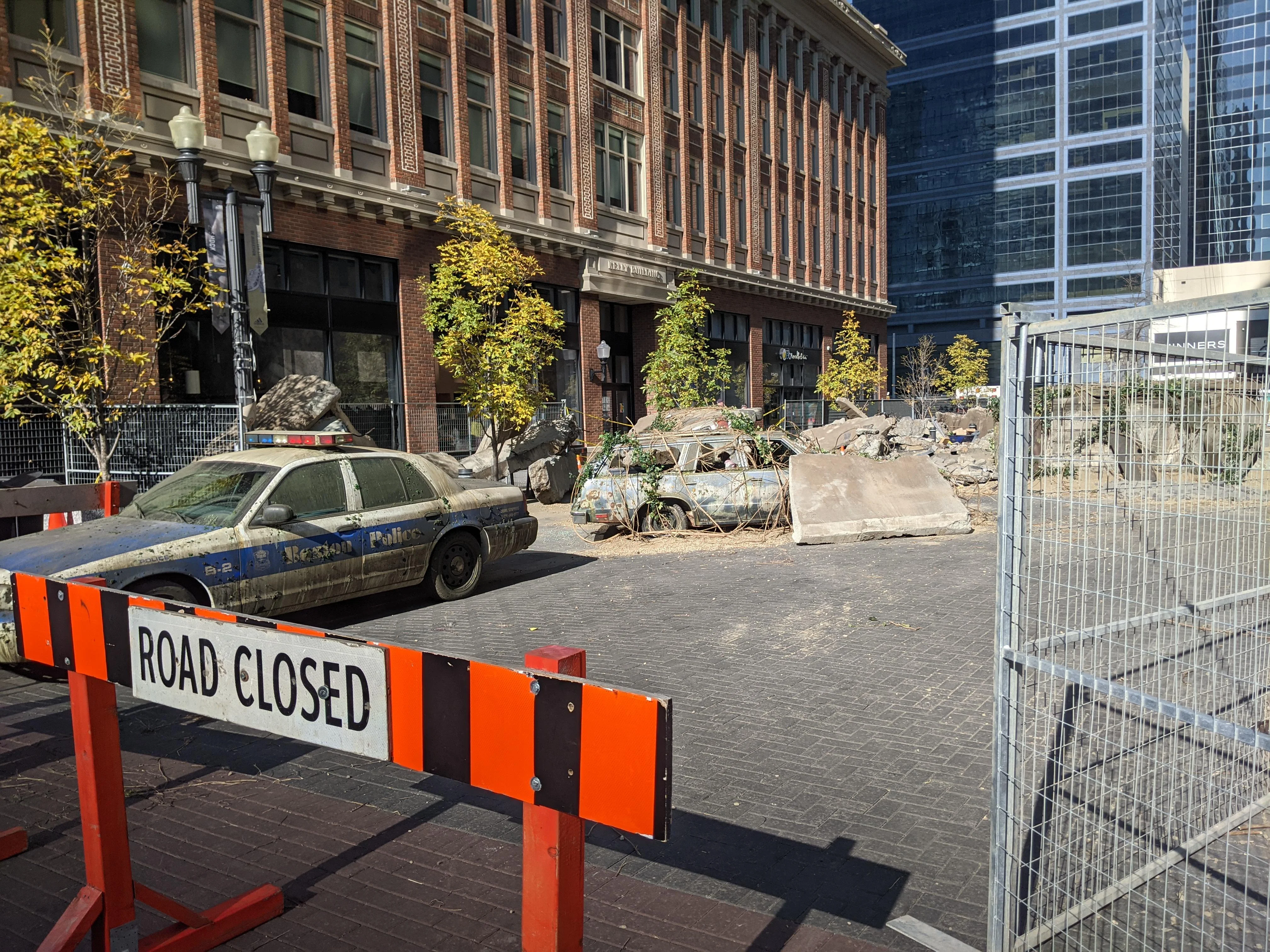
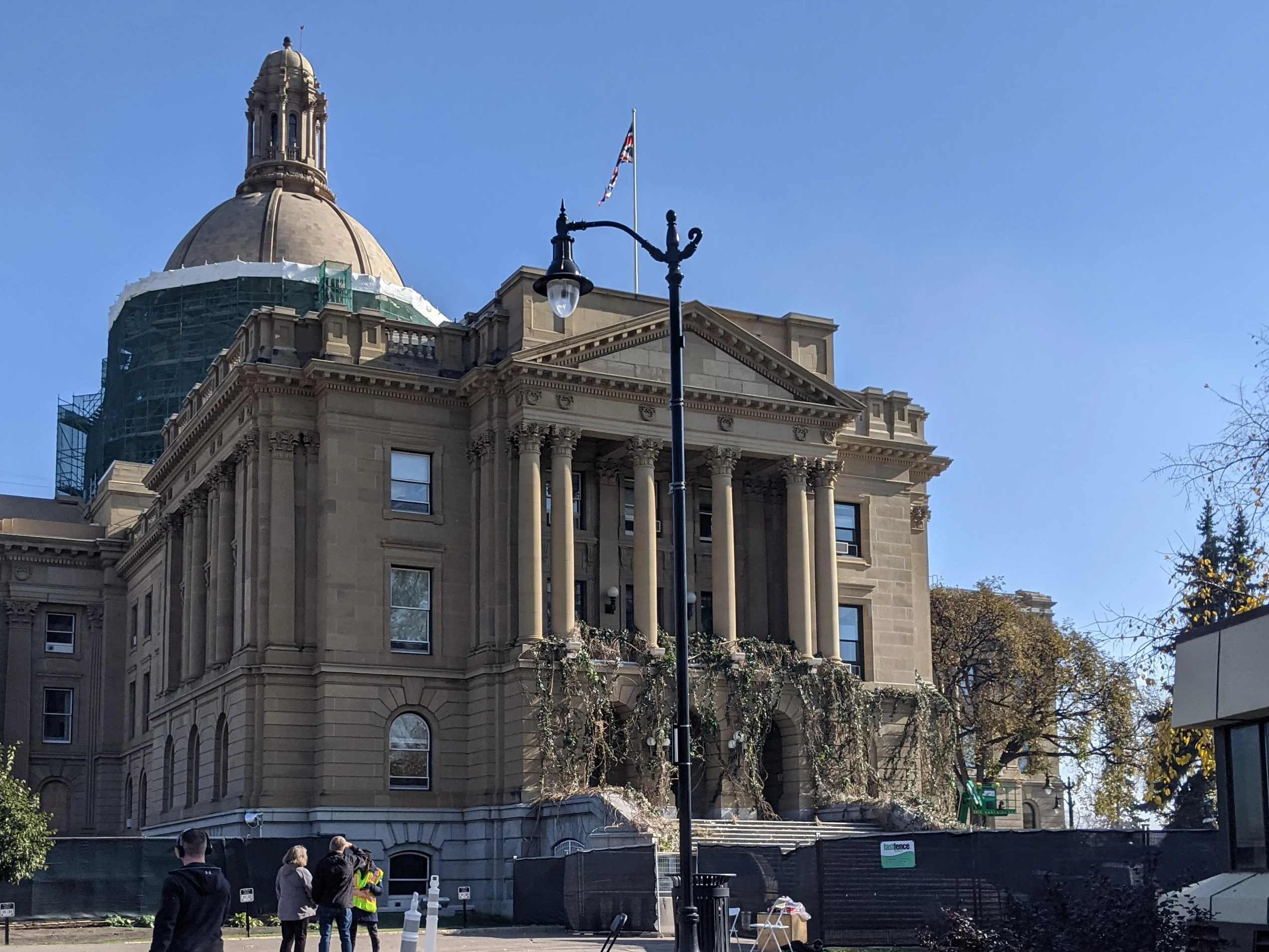
Filming took place in Downtown Edmonton in October 2021, including Rice Howard Way (top) and the Alberta Legislature Building (bottom).

Ksenia Sereda worked as cinematographer for the episode. Filming took place in and around Rice Howard Way in Downtown Edmonton from October 2–18, requiring the closure of sidewalks between October 12–14; Pascal filmed establishing shots in the area in early October and returned for full production later in the month alongside Ramsey and Torv. The location replicated a post-apocalyptic Boston; production designer John Paino was unable to find a location imitating Boston's brick-lined streets, requiring manual transformation and sculpting on set. Manual tree placement was similarly required, as Canadian trees share few similarities with those in Boston. Rice Howard Way was set up with a large crater in front of an Italian restaurant and a green screen for the skyline. The production crew converted a local business into a ruined salon and asked another if they would permit a stunt performer to fly through the front window.

Production took place at the Alberta Legislature Building, which was dressed with vines and greenery. Production spent around CA$372,000 for a four-day shoot in Edmonton. Some streets in downtown Calgary were closed for production from October 15–18, followed by the closure of several blocks in Beltline from October 23–28. Shutting down the Fourth Avenue flyover took the locations team around six to eight weeks of negotiations with the city. The hotel interior location required draining as fungi quickly began to grow.

The Indonesian Ministry of Health was filmed at the Southern Alberta Institute of Technology's Senator Burns Building: the lab in the basement and the office in its fourth-floor lounge. Paino designed the lab with "big and sinister" air ducts; he kept the colors simple to maintain realism and avoid resembling science fiction. A noodle restaurant on Centre Street in Calgary was used as the Indonesian restaurant in the opening scene, and the historic Canadian Bank of Commerce building was dressed up as the exterior of the Bostonian Museum. Druckmann's work on the episode completed production by November 7, 2021.

== Reception ==
=== Broadcast and ratings ===
The episode aired on HBO on January 22, 2023. The episode had 5.7 million viewers in the United States on its first night, including linear viewers and streams on HBO Max—an increase of 22% from the previous week, the largest second-week audience growth for an original HBO drama series in the network's history. On linear television, it had 633,000 viewers on its first night, with a 0.18 ratings share.

=== Critical response ===
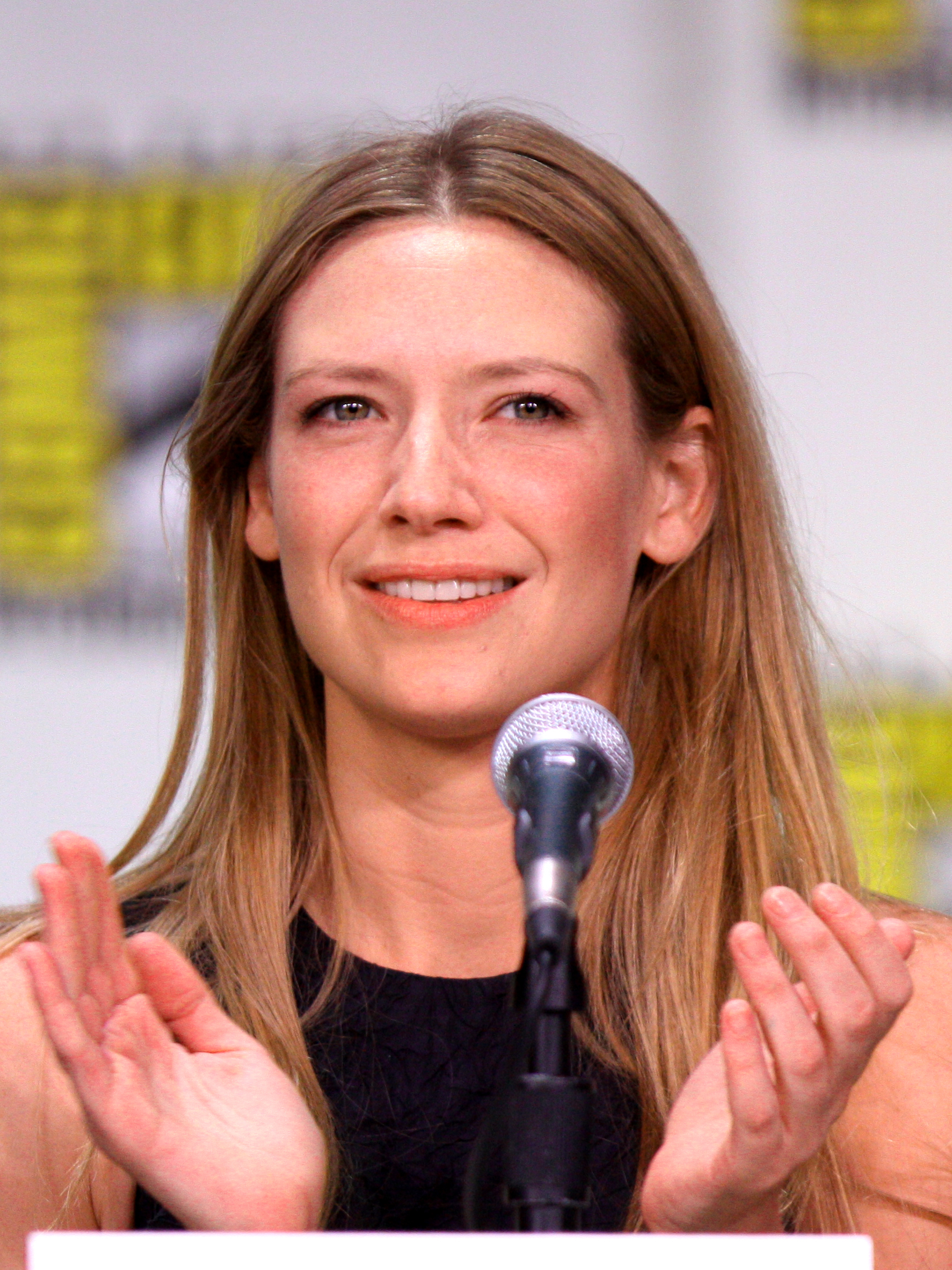
Anna Torv's performance as Tess was widely praised by critics, and earned her an Emmy nomination for Outstanding Guest Actress in a Drama Series.

On review aggregator Rotten Tomatoes, "Infected" has an approval rating of 97% based on 37 reviews, with an average rating of 8.4/10. The website's critical consensus said the episode features "a terrific turn by Anna Torv and monsters that fully deliver on their terrifying potential". Praise was directed at Pascal's performance for his restraint and Ramsey for their humor, and Den of Geek's Boo commended all three cast members for acting "with intention", allowing viewers to witness their emotional foundations. Push Square's Aaron Bayne felt Ramsey had not yet "embodied the role" of Ellie like Pascal with Joel but enjoyed their banter. TVLine named Torv the Performer of the Week, citing her complexity and subtlety. Total Film's Bradley Russell felt she demonstrated Tess's emotional depth, and Den of Geek's Bernard Boo found her performance sophisticated and heartbreaking. IGN's Simon Cardy wrote she displayed "warmth beneath a scarred, steely surface", lauding her relationship with Pascal's Joel. IndieWire's Steve Greene applauded Torv's capability to demonstrate Tess's sadness and pain through facial expressions alone.

Total Film's Russell lauded Mazin's writing and found quiet moments and conversations carried purpose and dramatic weight. The Escapist's Darren Mooney felt the script occasionally felt "like reading a strategy guide" due to the amount of exposition delivered through dialogue, noting it was effective but not compelling. The cold open was generally well-received; The Washington Post's Mikhail Klimentov found it more effective than the previous episode's due to its delivery of melancholy and dread without the restraint of providing context, though Den of Geek's Boo considered it "less compelling" than the entirety of the first episode. IGN's Cardy wrote the kiss between Tess and the infected validated the creative decision to replace spores with tendrils. Conversely, Total Film's Russell considered it "a baffling choice and fundamentally silly", and The Washington Post's Klimentov found it the worst sequence of the series to date. Several outlets similarly reported viewers were similarly divided on the scene; some called it heartbreaking and others considered it unnecessary.

Several critics praised Druckmann's directing and Sereda's cinematography, particularly during the museum action sequence; Den of Geek's Boo called it "masterfully choreographed" and compared it to the video game, and IGN's Cardy found it fit the inelegant aesthetic of the world. Total Film's Russell praised Druckmann's "keen eye for beauty in this shattered world", citing a shot of a frog on a piano as a standout. The New York Times's Noel Murray felt the low-angle shots allowed an effective backdrop for visual effects. Reviewers lauded the production design; IGN's Cardy considered it "one of the show's high points" with its visualization of nature reclaiming civilization. Den of Geek's Boo found the design and sounds of the clickers appropriately frightening; The Hollywood Reporter's Daniel Fienberg called them "a genre palate cleanser" after The Walking Dead's design.

=== Accolades ===
At the 75th Primetime Creative Arts Emmy Awards, the episode won Outstanding Prosthetic Makeup (Note: Nominees: prosthetics designer Barrie Gower; prosthetics makeup co-department head Sarah Gower; and key prosthetics makeup artists Paul Spateri, Nelly Guimaras, Johnny Murphy, Joel Hall, and Lucy Pittard) and was nominated for Production Design (Note: Nominees: production designer John Paino; art director Don Macaulay; and set decorator Paul Healy) and Torv for Outstanding Guest Actress in a Drama Series. It won Outstanding Visual Effects in a Photoreal Episode (Note: Nominees: Alex Wang, Sean Nowlan, Stephen James, Simon Jung, and Joel Whist) and was nominated for Outstanding Compositing and Lighting in an Episode (Note: Nominees: Casey Gorton, Francesco Dell'Anna, Vaclav Kubant, and Natalia Valbuena for the Boston set) at the 22nd Visual Effects Society Awards. Paino won Excellence in Production Design for a One-Hour Fantasy Single-Camera Series at the Art Directors Guild Awards 2023, and the sound team (Note: Nominees: Michael Benavente, Marc Fishman, Kevin Roache, Chris Terhune, and Chris Battaglia) won Outstanding Sound – Episode or Non-Theatrical Feature at the Hollywood Professional Association Awards. The kiss between Tess and the infected was nominated for Best Kiss at the 2023 MTV Movie & TV Awards.
