= Endure and Survive =

- The Last of Us episode
- A horde of infected, including a large bloater, overrun a cul-de-sac. Filmed over four weeks, the action sequence required extensive planning and a nine-week set construction.
- Episode no.: Season 1 Episode 5
- Directed by: Jeremy Webb
- Written by: Craig Mazin
- Cinematography by: Eben Bolter
- Editing by: Timothy A. Good; Emily Mendez
- Original release date: February 10, 2023 (Note: The episode was released online on HBO Max and HBO on Demand ahead of its broadcast on television on February 12.)
- Running time: 59 minutes

Guest appearances
- Lamar Johnson as Henry Burrell; Melanie Lynskey as Kathleen Coghlan; Keivonn Montreal Woodard as Sam; Jeffrey Pierce as Perry; John Getz as Edelstein

Episode chronology
← Previous "Please Hold to My Hand"	Next → "Kin"
- The Last of Us season 1

"Endure and Survive" is the fifth episode of the first season of the American post-apocalyptic drama television series The Last of Us. The episode was written by series co-creator Craig Mazin and directed by Jeremy Webb. It was released online on HBO Max and HBO on Demand on February 10, 2023, ahead of its broadcast on HBO on February 12. In the episode, Joel (Pedro Pascal) and Ellie (Bella Ramsey) agree to escape Kansas City, Missouri, with Henry (Lamar Johnson) and his brother Sam (Keivonn Montreal Woodard), who are being hunted by resistance leader Kathleen (Melanie Lynskey) and her second-in-command Perry (Jeffrey Pierce).

The episode was primarily filmed in April 2022. A full set was built in an empty lot in nine weeks for use in an action sequence in the episode. Filmed over four weeks, the sequence used around 70 actors dressed by 70 prosthetics artists. "Endure and Survive" introduced a "bloater", a mutated creature significantly larger and stronger than most other infected; the costume was built using prosthetics and later emphasized using visual effects.

The episode received positive reviews, with praise for its writing, direction, cinematography, and performances of Johnson, Woodard, Lynskey, and Ramsey. It was watched by 11.6 million viewers within three days. The episode received several nominations at the 75th Primetime Creative Arts Emmy Awards, including for Johnson, Lynskey, and Woodard, and editors Timothy A. Good and Emily Mendez won Outstanding Picture Editing.

== Plot ==
After a resistance movement overthrows the government and takes control of Kansas City, Missouri, their leader Kathleen Coghlan sets out to find Henry Burrell, whom she blames for the death of her brother Michael. Henry and his young, deaf brother Sam take refuge with elderly doctor Edelstein, who fails to return from a scouting trip ten days later. (Note: Kathleen's murder of Edelstein is depicted in "Please Hold to My Hand".) The brothers track down Joel and Ellie, who agree to help them escape. Kathleen confides to her second-in-command Perry that Michael had told her to forgive Henry before his execution, but she contends that this advice did not work out for Michael; she vows vengeance instead, and Perry agrees.

Henry reveals to Joel that he was a FEDRA collaborator prior to the revolution, angering Joel. He proposes using the abandoned tunnels under the city to avoid Kathleen's followers. Joel hesitantly agrees while Ellie continues to bond with Sam. Henry admits he betrayed Michael to obtain medication for Sam's leukemia. After they leave the tunnels, a sniper pins down the group in a cul-de-sac. Joel kills him, but not before he alerts Kathleen who arrives with an armed militia.

Kathleen rebukes Henry's reason for betraying Michael and declares that Sam deserved to succumb to his leukemia. As she prepares to kill him, a damaged truck crashes through the ground and releases a massive crowd of infected, including a heavily mutated specimen known as a "bloater" which tears Perry apart. Joel provides covering fire while Ellie rescues Sam and Henry. Kathleen corners them and again prepares to kill Henry but is ambushed and mauled to death by a child clicker. Joel, Ellie, Sam, and Henry flee while the infected head towards the city.

At a motel later that night, Henry accepts Joel's invitation to join him and Ellie in Wyoming. Sam reveals to Ellie that an infected bit him during the attack. Ellie spreads her blood on Sam's bite mark, hoping it will cure him. She promises to stay up with him through the night, but inadvertently falls asleep. The next morning, an infected Sam attacks her, prompting Henry to shoot him with Joel's gun. Horrified, Henry shoots himself. Joel and Ellie bury the brothers, and Ellie leaves a written apology on Sam's grave before leaving with Joel.

== Production ==
=== Conception and writing ===
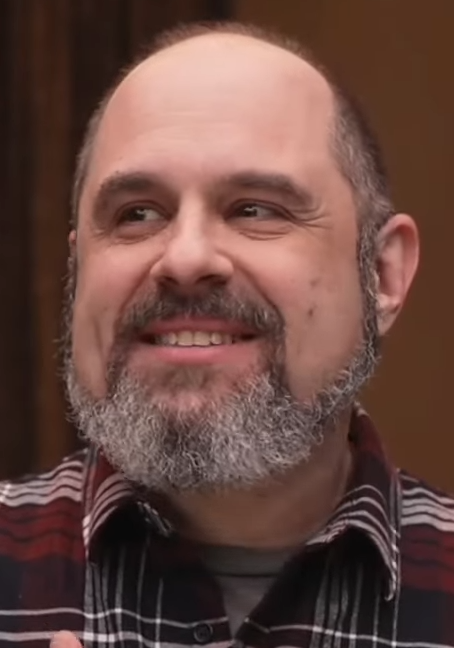
The episode was written by series co-creator Craig Mazin.

"Endure and Survive" was written by Craig Mazin and directed by Jeremy Webb. The Directors Guild of Canada revealed Webb would direct for the series in January 2022. Rotten Tomatoes revealed the episode's title in January 2023. The Last of Us series co-creators Mazin and Neil Druckmann, the latter of whom wrote and co-directed the video game on which the series is based, found the differing perspectives of the television series granted an opportunity to explore the backstory of Kansas City—a replacement of Pittsburgh from the game—and show the stories behind the violence, the aftermath of which Joel and Ellie discover in the game.

The writers wanted to honor the game's unseen character Ish—who built a community in tunnels underneath the city—but found they could not properly depict it in the episode, opting for brief references. Mazin felt a standalone episode focusing on Ish may have worked but found environmental storytelling more effective. The writers understood the game's sniper sequence would have translated poorly to television and chose to make the shooter an old man to add sadness to the scene. While meeting with Druckmann and Webb in Santa Monica, California, Mazin realized the full action sequence would be more effective at night—as opposed to day like the game—as its visuals and the creepiness of infected would be improved. The episode's credits use the song "Fuel to Fire" by Agnes Obel, which subsequently ranked fifth on Billboard's Top TV Songs chart for February, with 378,000 streams and 1,000 downloads.

=== Casting and characters ===
Lamar Johnson and Keivonn Montreal Woodard's casting as Henry and Sam was announced in August 2021. Johnson recalled his casting process occurred quickly: he sent his audition tape on Monday, received the role by Wednesday, departed for the set by Saturday, and began filming by Wednesday. He had played the game and wanted to avoid imitating the original performance due to its impact. He was nervous about the role due to the character's importance, but found his nervousness prompted him to challenge himself. Mazin provided information to Johnson regarding Henry's backstory to help him understand the character. Johnson felt Henry was hurt by his own actions against Michael, but Sam was ultimately more important to him. Mazin and Druckmann had several long discussions regarding Henry's fate and considered many alternatives, but ultimately considered his suicide, like in the game, reflected that he had nothing left after Sam's death. Johnson found the final scenes emotionally draining due to his relationship with Woodard; he "tried to be as present and authentic as possible" as he considered it the most important and iconic scene of the characters, and felt Pedro Pascal did the same opposite him as Joel. He was allowed to experiment with the scene, including performing lines similar to the game; he wanted to portray Henry's shock and confusion at the sudden events. Johnson believed Henry's final decision was to join Sam, as he felt they were likely religious. He recalled crying behind the camera with Webb during Ellie's final scene with Sam.

Bella Ramsey, who portrays Ellie, felt Sam brought out Ellie's childlike energy, which they largely attributed to Woodard. Mazin wrote Sam as deaf—a change from the game—to avoid his relationship with Henry feeling repetitious of Ellie's with Joel, which he felt would have been emphasized due to the different perspectives of the series. He had been watching the television series This Close (2018–2019)—which follows two deaf characters—and felt it may have influenced his decision. He found it automatically introduced intimacy to the scenes due to their quietness, which contrasted with Ellie's talkative nature. Druckmann was instantly drawn to the idea and wished he had included it in the game. Mazin hired This Close co-creator Shoshannah Stern to review the scripts. The production team faced difficulties in casting Sam; they were met with minimal candidates. In February 2021, Mazin distributed a casting call for a boy aged 8–14 who is deaf, black, and proficient in American Sign Language (ASL) or Black American Sign Language; Deaf West Theatre confirmed this was for the character of Sam. He had expected to receive around 80 auditions, but ultimately got about five, including Woodard; it was his first acting role.

Mazin felt Sam's leukemia was a more significant part of his story than his deafness. CJ Jones, whom Mazin met through Stern, acted as Woodard's liaison to the crew and helped teach ASL to cast and crew; Johnson began learning the language via Zoom shortly after arriving in Calgary, and spent his time away from set learning the language. He did not want viewers to think his knowledge of the language was fake, and considered his performance important for deaf representation. He felt spending time around Woodard for production gave him a better grasp on the language; Woodard would sometimes correct his mistakes in scenes. Ramsey similarly learned ASL during production. Sam's age was reduced from the game to allow him to look up to Ellie; Mazin felt this justified his revelation of his bite to Ellie, which does not occur in the game. In portraying Sam's bravery, Woodard recalled his own experiences of being told to stay brave after his father died. Johnson and Woodard worked on the series for two-and-a-half months.

Mazin and Druckmann did not want characters like Kathleen to feel like non-player characters from a video game, opting to give them full stories to humanize them and justify their actions. They felt adding a connection between Kathleen and Henry—and, by extension, to Joel and Ellie—made the storylines more effective and justified the different perspectives. Mazin wanted Kathleen's death to represent the notion of violent actions meeting violent ends, and Druckmann felt her obsession with justice led her to become distracted from her own survival. Melanie Lynskey knew of Kathleen's fate when she accepted the role. She found the scene easy to film due to the coordination of the team, as they had been planning for weeks. Mazin found it important that Kathleen was killed by a child, as minutes earlier she had told Henry that children die all the time. Lynskey recorded her death sounds as automated dialogue replacement (ADR); Mazin and Druckmann directed her to "sound like someone was ripping your throat out". Lynskey's husband Jason Ritter had a cameo appearance as an infected creature.

Jeffrey Pierce felt Perry was in love with Kathleen, which prompted several of his actions. He considered Perry's sacrifice selfless as it was to allow Kathleen to escape, and thought it reflected Perry's constant wish to be a hero. Mazin had told Pierce earlier that he was "gonna get the best death of the entire season". Pierce played the role akin to a rōnin from an Akira Kurosawa film and saw his death as an honorable "samurai death", sacrificing himself for the woman he loves.

=== Filming ===
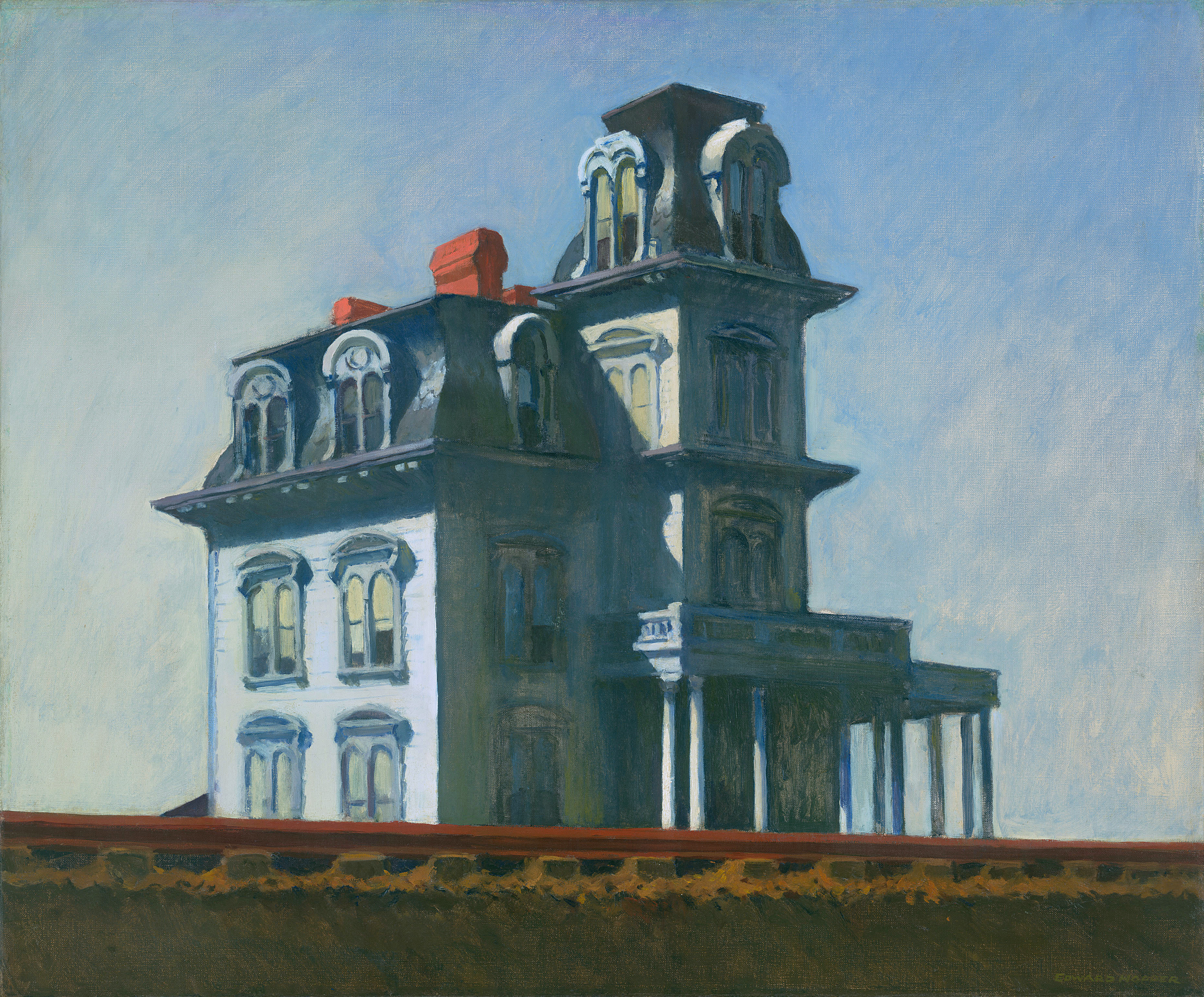
The design of the sniper house in the action sequence was partly inspired by Edward Hopper's painting House by the Railroad (1925).

"Endure and Survive" was primarily filmed in April 2022, shortly before production finished on the season finale. Eben Bolter worked as cinematographer for the episode. Johnson and Woodard were on set in Calgary on March 23, 2022. The classroom and tunnels were built in the cellar underneath the old Inglewood Brewery in Calgary; production designer John Paino and his team enjoyed the "kind of dankness" it had. The team mapped the room with laser scanning to allow the visual effects team to extend the hallways. Production took place around the Calgary Courts Centre and Victoria Park in May. Pascal and Ramsey were spotted on set in Calgary in May, followed some days later by military vehicles representing FEDRA.

The action sequence took significant planning—Bolter estimated around 80% of the episode's planning focused on the scene—and was filmed in four weeks; about a week-and-a-half was dedicated to the infected horde rising from the ground. The sequence was one of few in the series prepared on a storyboard due to the combination of elements like pyrotechnics and visual effects, which presented potential dangers. The neighborhood was built in an empty lot near the Calgary Film Centre to allow full control of the significant special effects required. Modelers crafted to-scale versions of the area based on Lidar scans of Kansas City, and the game and real Kansas City neighborhoods were referenced. The nine-week building process, led by Paino, art director Don Macaulay, and construction coordinator Donadino Valentino Centanni, involved crafting asphalt driveways, paving gravel, arranging damaged vehicles, and constructing front and sides of thirteen houses; they engaged several housebuilders for construction. The sniper's three-story building was modeled after Edward Hopper's painting House by the Railroad (1925) and the Bates residence from Psycho (1960). The interior was aged for two weeks with water, and Calgary's snow and ice added more water damage, which Paino appreciated.

Webb cited Saving Private Ryan (1998) as inspiration for some of the shots during the sequence, particularly from Joel's perspective in the house or Ellie's on the street. A camera with a sniper scope was used for Joel, and three handheld cameras were used to track the action sequence from the ground, with long lenses "to compress the space, to make it feel scary and cinematic and real". The shots of the truck crashing into the house and the subsequent explosion could only be filmed once. Bolter faced difficulty lighting the sequence. Street lights located two blocks away were switched off to allow Bolter to fully craft the lighting. He took inspiration from stadiums by surrounding the set with backlights and lighting from above with ambient light. Troy Baker, who portrayed Joel in the video games and James in the television series, visited the set while he was in the city for a convention. The ending scenes at the motel were filmed in Nanton, Alberta. The episode completed production in the early hours of June 11, marking the final day of principal photography for the season, two days later than originally scheduled.

=== Prosthetics and visual effects ===
Barrie and Sarah Gower led the prosthetics teams for the series. Around 60 actors were used in the infected mob, and 10 to 15 wore clicker masks, all crafted by 70 prosthetic artists; they applied prosthetics to about 30 people in each three-hour shift. The makeup process began around 3:00 p.m. to prepare for shooting, which began at 9:00 p.m. Due to the amount of infected in the episode, the production team worked with Terry Notary to coordinate their movements; he set up a boot camp to prepare the actors for the role. The child clicker—designed by Naughty Dog artist Hyoung Taek Nam, who originally designed clickers for the game—was portrayed by a young contortionist actress, Skye Belle Cowton; prosthetics and visual effects were combined to make the creature. Mazin insisted Cowton wear a Blue's Clues shirt to contrast the innocence and horror.

The visual effects team consulted with Mazin and Druckmann to emphasize her childlike features, adding pigtails and showing more of her face. Sixteen visual effects teams worked on the action sequence; while the season averaged 250 visual effects shots per episode, "Endure and Survive" had around 350 to 400. Wētā FX created the visual effects of the infected; 50 to 70 infected were added to the horde through visual effects. Mazin compared the infected emerging from the ground to an ant colony, as well as a scene of goblins in the mines in The Lord of the Rings: The Fellowship of the Ring (2001), which he considered terrifying.

The writers spent months trying to decide whether or not to include a bloater in the series before ultimately adding it. It was portrayed by actor Adam Basil, with whom Barrie Gower had worked on Game of Thrones. A cast of Basil's body was created to help create the bloater. The 40-kilogram (88 lb) suit was coated in a gel-like liquid during filming to appear wet and reflective. Gower said his team wanted the creature to have a "practical presence" for interaction on set, which could later be emphasized with visual effects; the bloater was made taller and given additional muscle definition. In the script, Mazin wrote that the bloater tore Perry in two at the waist, but Druckmann wanted his death to be more grounded; as visual effects were implemented, Mazin realized decapitation looked more realistic and paid homage to the games.

== Reception ==
=== Broadcast and ratings ===
The episode was released online on HBO Max and HBO on Demand on February 10, 2023, ahead of its broadcast on television to avoid conflicting with Super Bowl LVII. It aired on HBO in its weekly slot on February 12. The episode had 11.6 million viewers in the United States on its first weekend, including linear viewers and streams on HBO Max. On linear television, it had 382,000 viewers, with a 0.09 ratings share.

=== Critical response ===
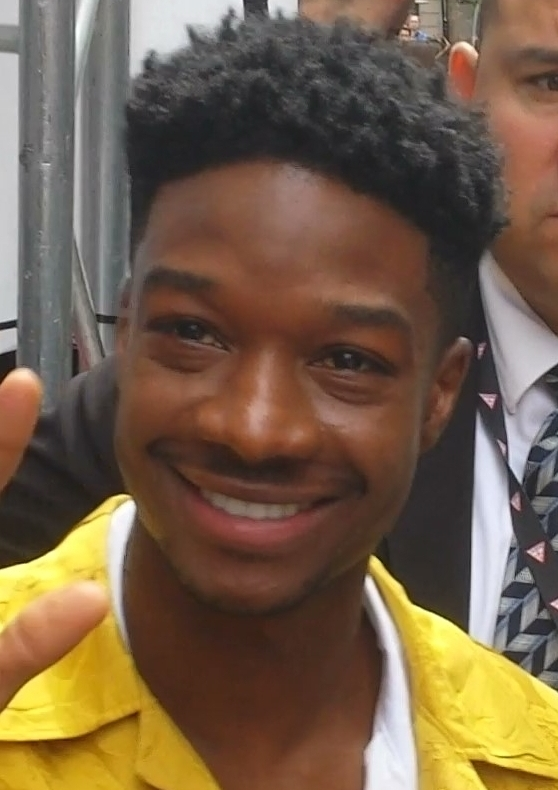
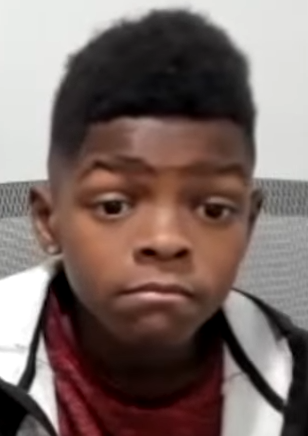
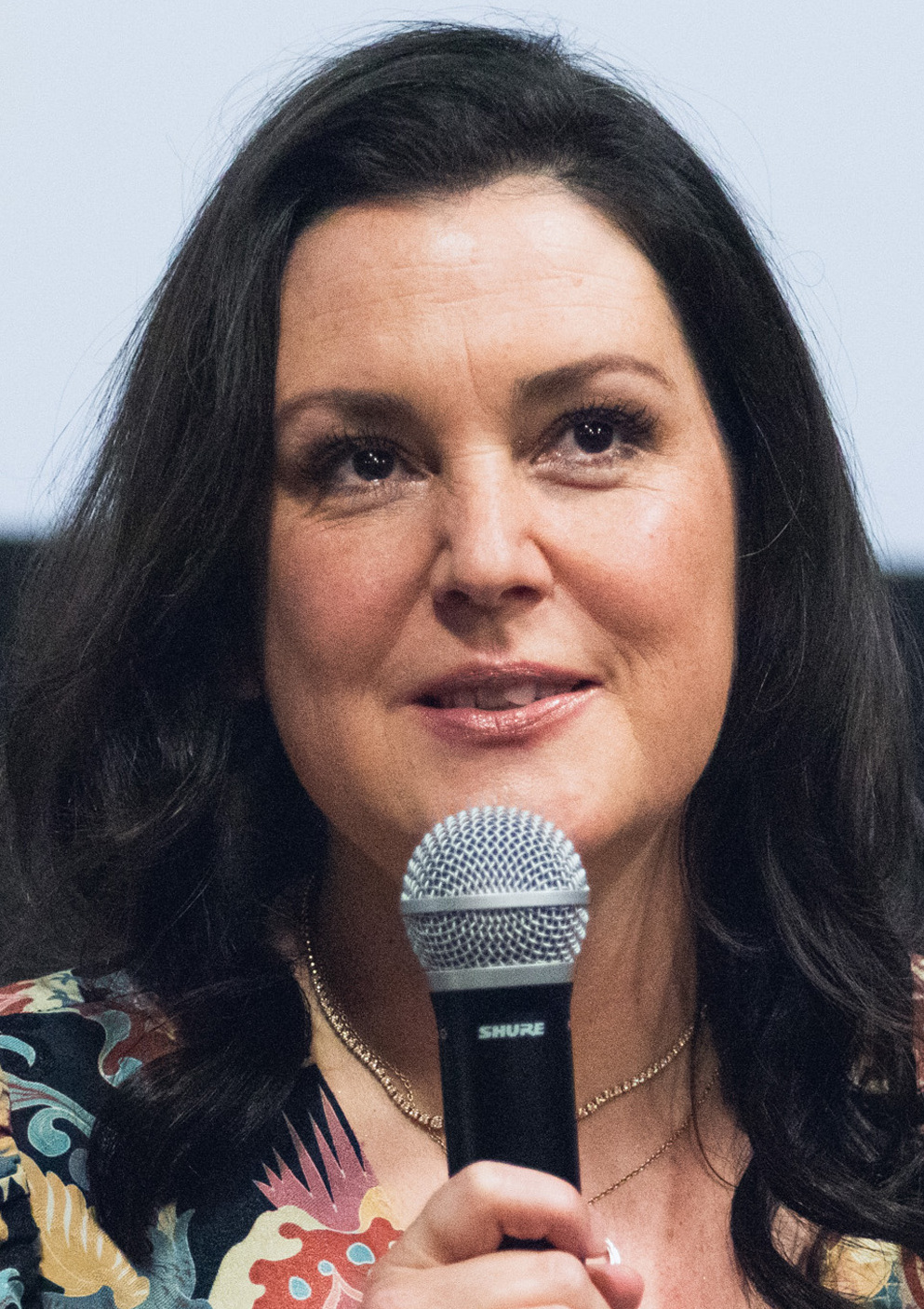
The performances of Lamar Johnson, Keivonn Montreal Woodard, and Melanie Lynskey (L–R) were praised by critics, and earned them nominations at the 75th Primetime Creative Arts Emmy Awards.

On review aggregator Rotten Tomatoes, "Endure and Survive" has an approval rating of 95% based on 37 reviews, with an average rating of 9.1/10. The website's critical consensus called the episode "a sobering reminder of how unsparing this apocalyptic world can be". IndieWire named "Endure and Survive" the seventh-best television episode of 2023; Ben Travers praised its portrayal of love and loss in the midst of authoritarian rule.

The performances of Johnson, Woodard, Lynskey, and Ramsey received particular praise. Den of Geek's Bernard Boo called Ramsey's reaction to Henry's death "utterly heartbreaking", and Total Film's Bradley Russell found their award-worthy performance throughout the episode made the moment more effective. TVLine named Johnson an honorable mention for Performer of the Week; IGN's Simon Cardy lauded his emotional performance in his final scene, and Russell felt the naivety of Woodard's role intensified the narrative. Boo thought Lynskey and Pierce's performances effectively conveyed Perry's devotion to Kathleen. The A.V. Club's David Cote found Lynskey's delivery "edges dangerously close to end-times camp".

Reviewers lauded Mazin's writing. IndieWire's Travers called the episode "a potent examination of heroes and villains". The Escapist's Darren Mooney found it "surprisingly literary", citing the imagery of the rising infected being built thematically beforehand, and found the zombie apocalypse tropes were employed more elegantly than in the show's first and second episodes. Total Film's Russell considered some moments—like Henry painting Sam's face—just as powerful as the show's acclaimed third episode, but found Kathleen's death underwhelming. Digital Spy's Janet A. Leigh found the episode's deaths pointless, noting Henry and Sam were not given enough meaningful scenes and questioning Kathleen's inclusion if only to kill her abruptly. Radio Times's Liam O'Dell criticized the episode's deaf representation and felt the writers made Sam deaf to manipulate emotions and depict Henry as a savior.

Rolling Stone's Alan Sepinwall praised the action sequences for remaining character-driven, and Kotaku's Claire Jackson thought the pacing of the sniper scene made it more effective than the game. Game Rant's Rabab Khan wrote that the cinematography captured the tension during the sniper sequence, and the changing shots effectively represented the horror of the subsequent action scenes. IGN's Simon Cardy found the cinematography reflected the intense atmosphere and the cuts from close-ups to wide shots emphasized the terror and scale. The A.V. Club's Cote lauded the production design, and Kotaku's Jackson praised the sniper's sound design. Den of Geek's Boo found the action entertaining enough to forgive the lack of character development earlier in the episode; and Push Square's Aaron Bayne felt the Kansas City scenes were less memorable and frightening than the game's Pittsburgh. Slant Magazine's Pat Brown found the action sequence insufficiently tense as the episode failed to "build the undead up as objects of real dread". Polygon's Pete Volk criticized it for its low lighting and the bloater for its weightlessness and lack of presence in the world, comparing it to the child clicker which he found effective due to its inhuman movements. Mashable's Belen Edwards praised Cowton's performance and movements.

=== Accolades ===
At the 75th Primetime Creative Arts Emmy Awards, Johnson and Woodard were nominated for Outstanding Guest Actor and Lynskey for Guest Actress for their performances; Johnson and Woodard lost to Nick Offerman from the season's third episode, and Lynskey to Storm Reid from the seventh. Woodard was the second-youngest Emmy nominee, (Note: The youngest-ever Emmy nominee is Keshia Knight Pulliam, nominated in 1986 for The Cosby Show.) the youngest ever for Guest Actor in a Drama Series, and the second deaf (Note: The first Emmy-nominated deaf actor is Marlee Matlin, with four nominations.) and first black deaf acting nominee. Johnson and Woodard were also nominated for Outstanding Guest Performance in a Drama Series at the Black Reel Awards of 2023, and Woodard was awarded Rising Star – Television at the 1st Celebration of Cinema and Television: Honoring Black, Latino and AAPI Achievements and Best Breakthrough Performance in a New Scripted Series at the 39th Independent Spirit Awards.

Timothy A. Good and Emily Mendez won Outstanding Picture Editing for a Drama Series at the Emmy Awards for their work on the episode, and were nominated for Outstanding Editing – Episode or Non-Theatrical Feature (Over 30 Minutes) at the Hollywood Professional Association Awards. The episode was nominated for Outstanding Contemporary Costumes (Note: Nominees: costume designer Cynthia Ann Summers; and assistant costume designers Kelsey Chobotar, Rebecca Toon, and Michelle Carr) at the Emmy Awards, and Cynthia Ann Summers was nominated for Excellence in Contemporary Television at the 26th Costume Designers Guild Awards. The episode won Outstanding Animated Character in an Episode or Real-Time Project for the Bloater (Note: Nominees: Gino Acevedo, Max Telfer, Dennis Yoo, and Fabio Leporelli) and Outstanding Compositing and Lighting in an Episode for the Infected Horde Battle (Note: Nominees: Matthew Lumb, Ben Roberts, Ben Campbell, and Quentin Hema) at the 22nd Visual Effects Society Awards, and was nominated for Art Direction for a Feature Film or Television Production (Note: Nominees: Art director Callum Webster, production designer John Paino, set designer Kyle White, and supervising art director Don Macaulay) at the Australian Production Design Guild Awards.
