= Kin (The Last of Us) =

- The Last of Us episode
- Ellie confronts Joel about his decision to part ways. Crafted to be almost identical to the video game, the scene was praised for Bella Ramsey and Pedro Pascal's performances.
- Episode no.: Season 1 Episode 6
- Directed by: Jasmila Žbanić
- Written by: Craig Mazin
- Cinematography by: Christine A. Maier
- Editing by: Timothy A. Good; Emily Mendez
- Original air date: February 19, 2023
- Running time: 58 minutes

Guest appearances
- Lamar Johnson as Henry Burrell; Rutina Wesley as Maria; Nico Parker as Sarah; Graham Greene as Marlon; Elaine Miles as Florence; Gabriel Luna as Tommy Miller

Episode chronology
← Previous "Endure and Survive"	Next → "Left Behind"
- The Last of Us season 1

"Kin" is the sixth episode of the first season of the American post-apocalyptic drama television series The Last of Us. Written by series co-creator Craig Mazin and directed by Jasmila Žbanić, it aired on HBO on February 19, 2023. In the episode, Joel (Pedro Pascal) and Ellie (Bella Ramsey) travel to Jackson, Wyoming, where they find Joel's brother Tommy (Gabriel Luna) and his wife Maria (Rutina Wesley).

The episode was filmed in November and December 2021. Žbanić was drawn to the story as she felt the functioning society of Jackson reflected her experiences growing up in Sarajevo. The town of Canmore, Alberta, was used to replicate Jackson; local businesses were transformed and buildings were constructed in the town, including a 30-foot-tall (9.1 m) log wall on a major street. The episode received positive reviews, with praise for its writing, direction, cinematography, and performances of Pascal, Ramsey, and Luna. It was watched by 7.8 million viewers on its first day. Pascal submitted the episode to support his nomination for Lead Actor in a Drama Series at the 75th Primetime Emmy Awards.

== Plot ==
Three months after Henry kills himself, Joel and Ellie arrive in Wyoming. An isolated couple, Florence and Marlon, tell them their whereabouts and warn them to avoid the dangers further west. Learning his brother Tommy may be dead, Joel has a panic attack.

Traveling further west, Joel and Ellie are surrounded by a group led by Maria, who takes them to a safe community in Jackson. Joel is reunited with Tommy. He and Ellie are provided food, clean clothing, and a house. Maria cuts Ellie's hair and warns her to be cautious of trusting others, citing Joel's dangerous past; Ellie rebuts, citing Tommy's. Ellie learns of Joel's daughter, Sarah, who died twenty years prior. (Note: As depicted in "When You're Lost in the Darkness") Joel tries to convince Tommy to join him and Ellie to reach the Fireflies who, Tommy believes, are in Colorado; Tommy declines as Maria is pregnant. While having another panic attack, Joel sees a girl reminding him of Sarah.

Later on, Joel confides in Tommy about Ellie's immunity and his declining health and mental state, citing dreams he cannot remember but recalls feeling loss. Joel asks Tommy to take Ellie to the Fireflies as he fears he cannot keep her safe. Tommy agrees to take her the following morning which Ellie overhears. Later, she acknowledges Joel's fears regarding his daughter's death, but argues she will only be more frightened by his absence. Joel, angered by Ellie bringing up Sarah's death, tells her she is not his daughter, nor he her father, and states they will part ways. Distraught, he retires to his bedroom and thinks of Sarah.

In the morning, Joel allows Ellie to choose whether to travel with him or Tommy, and she chooses him. They arrive at the University of Eastern Colorado, where they find the Fireflies have vacated; a map points towards St. Mary's Hospital in Salt Lake City, Utah. Joel and Ellie attempt to escape after seeing a group of raiders. One of the men attacks Joel; Joel kills him after sustaining a serious stab wound. Joel and Ellie escape the pursuing men on horseback, though Joel collapses from the horse afterward. Ellie begs him to survive, confessing she cannot continue without him.

== Production ==
=== Conception and writing ===
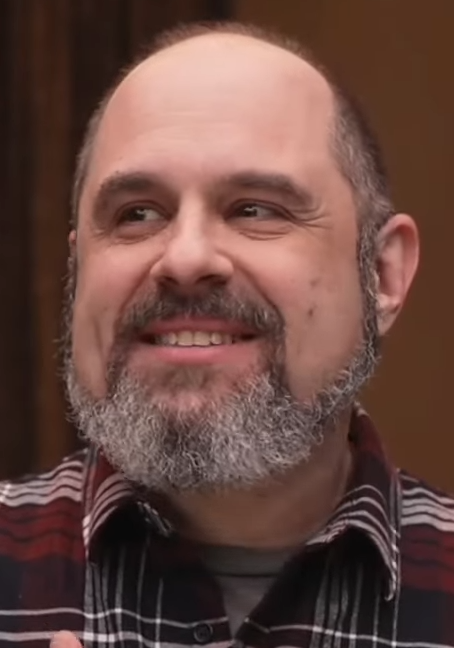
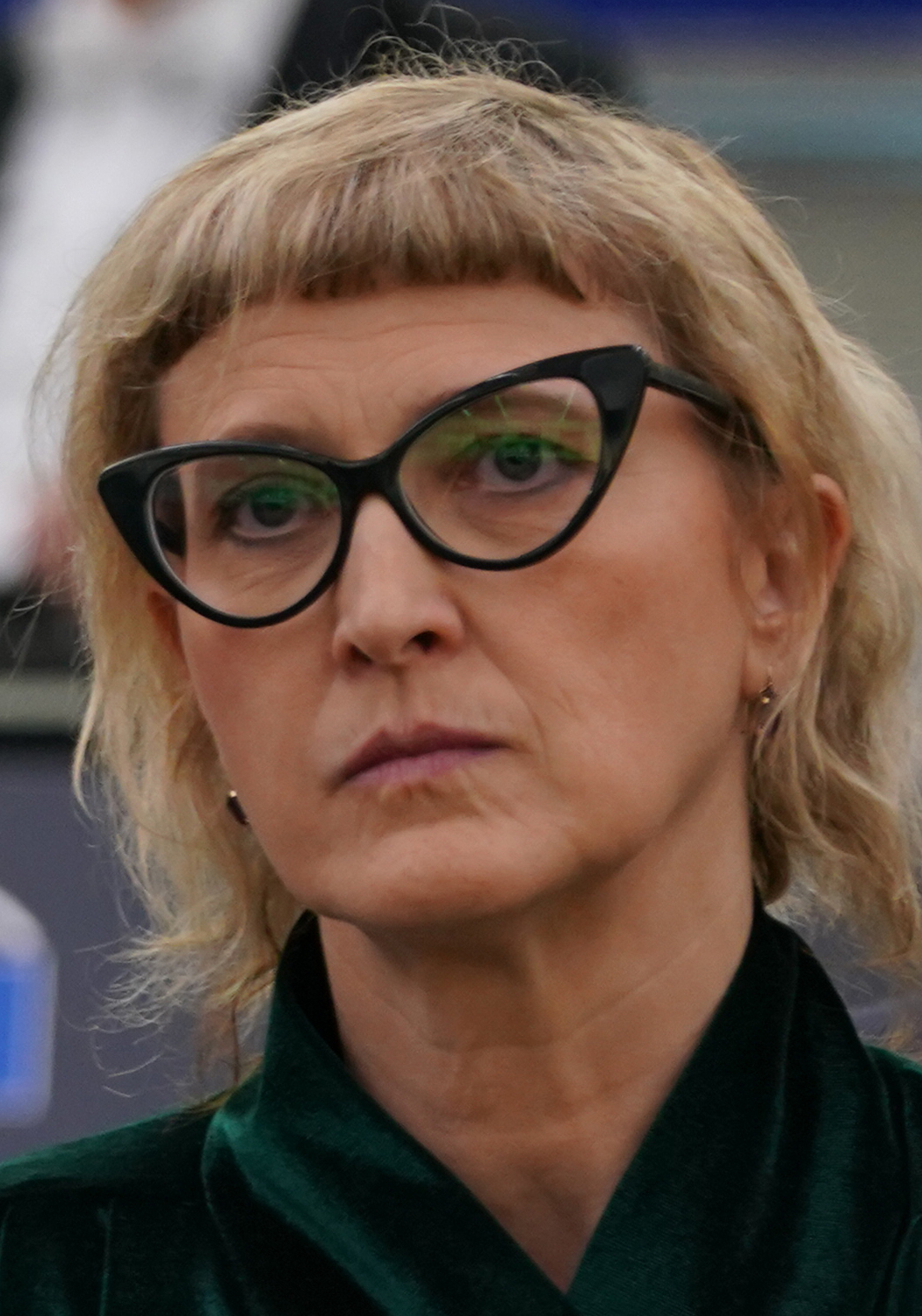
"Kin" was written by series co-creator Craig Mazin (left) and directed by Jasmila Žbanić (right).

"Kin" was written by The Last of Us series co-creator Craig Mazin and directed by Jasmila Žbanić; it was Žbanić's first experience in directing television. She was announced as one of the show's directors in April 2021. Žbanić was offered to direct the previous two episodes—"Please Hold to My Hand" and "Endure and Survive", which take place in war-torn Kansas City, Missouri—as she had lived through the Siege of Sarajevo. However, she was more interested in "Kin" as it demonstrated a functioning society; she felt she had survived in Sarajevo due to solidarity, which she wanted to reflect in Jackson. Žbanić attempted to play the game before watching YouTube videos instead, particularly of the sequences featured in "Kin". She found players told her they wanted "emotions and atmosphere" in the show, which she sought to include.

Mazin and co-creator Neil Druckmann, who wrote and co-directed the video game on which the series is based, wanted the beginning of "Kin" to provide levity after the traumatic ending of the previous episode, as well as demonstrate the development in Joel and Ellie's relationship. Joel's mention of feeling as though he has lost something in his sleep was a contribution by Pedro Pascal, who portrays the character. Mazin wanted Joel and Ellie's argument to be almost identical to the game's version, including the blocking and set design, due to its effectiveness and the impact it had on him; he considered it the game's most famous scene. Joel's injury was altered from the game—in which he is impaled by rebar after falling from a second-story balcony—as the series is more grounded in its action and impacts.

Jackson was not shown in the first game; Tommy and Maria's scenes in the first game took place at the dam near Jackson as the team lacked the time and budget to add the town. Jackson became the starting location for The Last of Us Part II (2020). For the show, Mazin and Druckmann felt moving the scenes inside the town made them more interesting. Ellie's interest in space was introduced in Part II. Mazin felt the television series provided the opportunity to reference elements of the sequel earlier. Joel's interest in living on a sheep ranch was similarly a reference to Part II. The girl staring at Ellie is a reference to Part II's Dina.

A song from the game's score—"All Gone" by Gustavo Santaolalla—is used in the episode to remind viewers of Sarah's death. The credits use the song "Never Let Me Down Again", sung by Mazin's daughter Jessica; the original version by Depeche Mode was used in the first episode. Mazin wanted the song to use a female voice to echo Ellie. He appreciated the moment as it involved Jessica, his real daughter, and Ellie's actor Bella Ramsey, who he considered like an adopted daughter. Mazin included the film The Goodbye Girl (1977), which he had watched growing up, as it told the story of a child gaining a father figure. He felt the inclusion of art demonstrated the town's functionality.

=== Casting and characters ===
Žbanić revealed the casting of Graham Greene, Elaine Miles, and Rutina Wesley on December 9, 2021. Greene and Miles were confirmed to be playing original characters Marlon and Florence in August 2022. Mazin felt, like other pairings in the show, they echoed parts of Joel and Ellie's relationship. Wesley's role as Maria was announced on January 9, 2023. She researched the game to "capture the essence" of Maria but wanted to avoid replicating it; she found it "terrifying" to play a pre-established character but wanted to add her "energy on it". She appreciated Maria's calmness as a leader and observed she was a person who only smiles with her eyes; she thought Maria naturally entered a leadership role due to her history as an assistant district attorney. Wesley felt Maria gravitated towards Ellie in a motherly manner without realizing, due in part to her pregnancy. Gabriel Luna felt Tommy was drawn towards Maria due to "her mercy and her strength". He thought Tommy felt guilty for moving on from Sarah's death, whereas Joel has not.

=== Filming ===
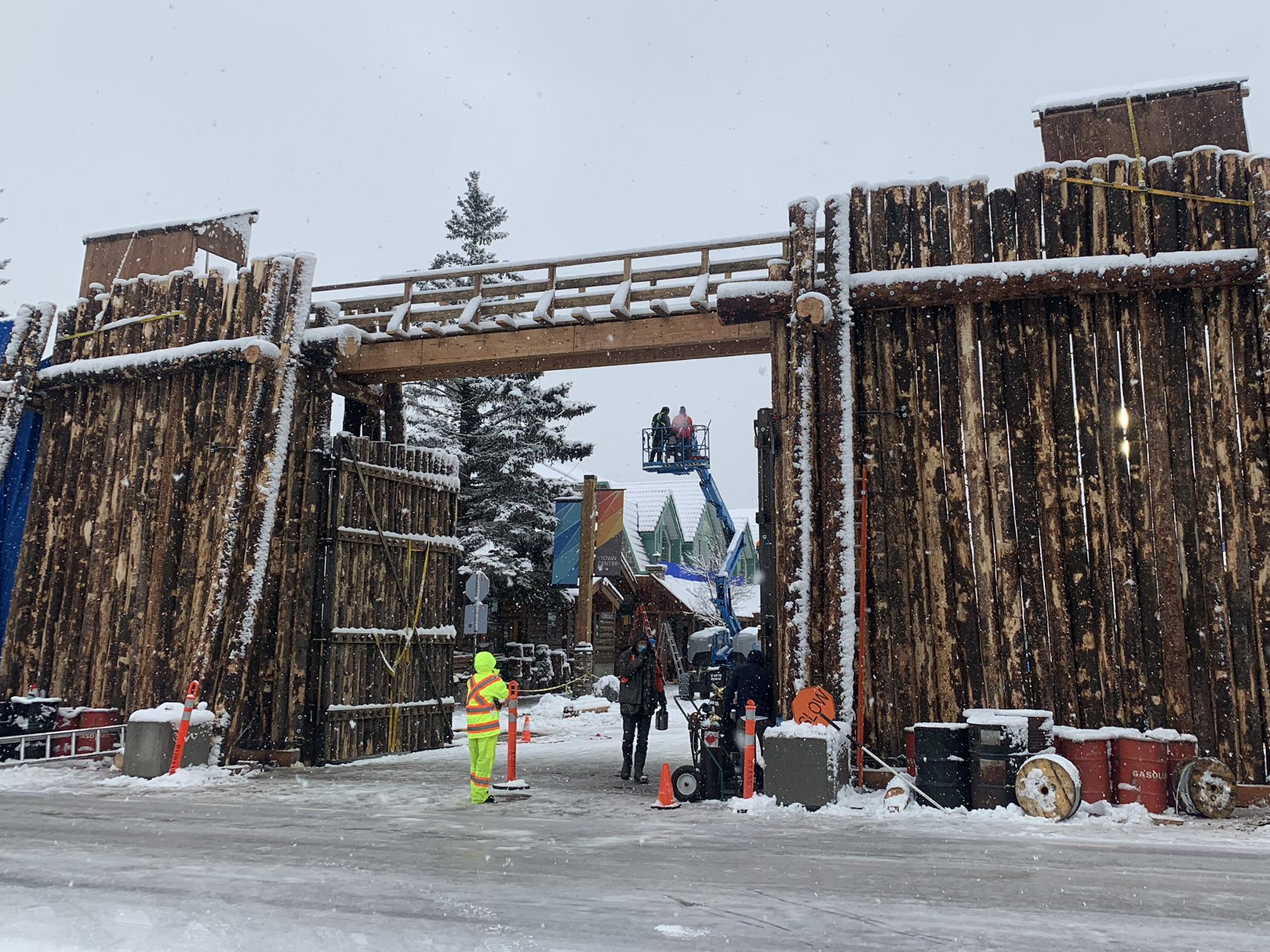
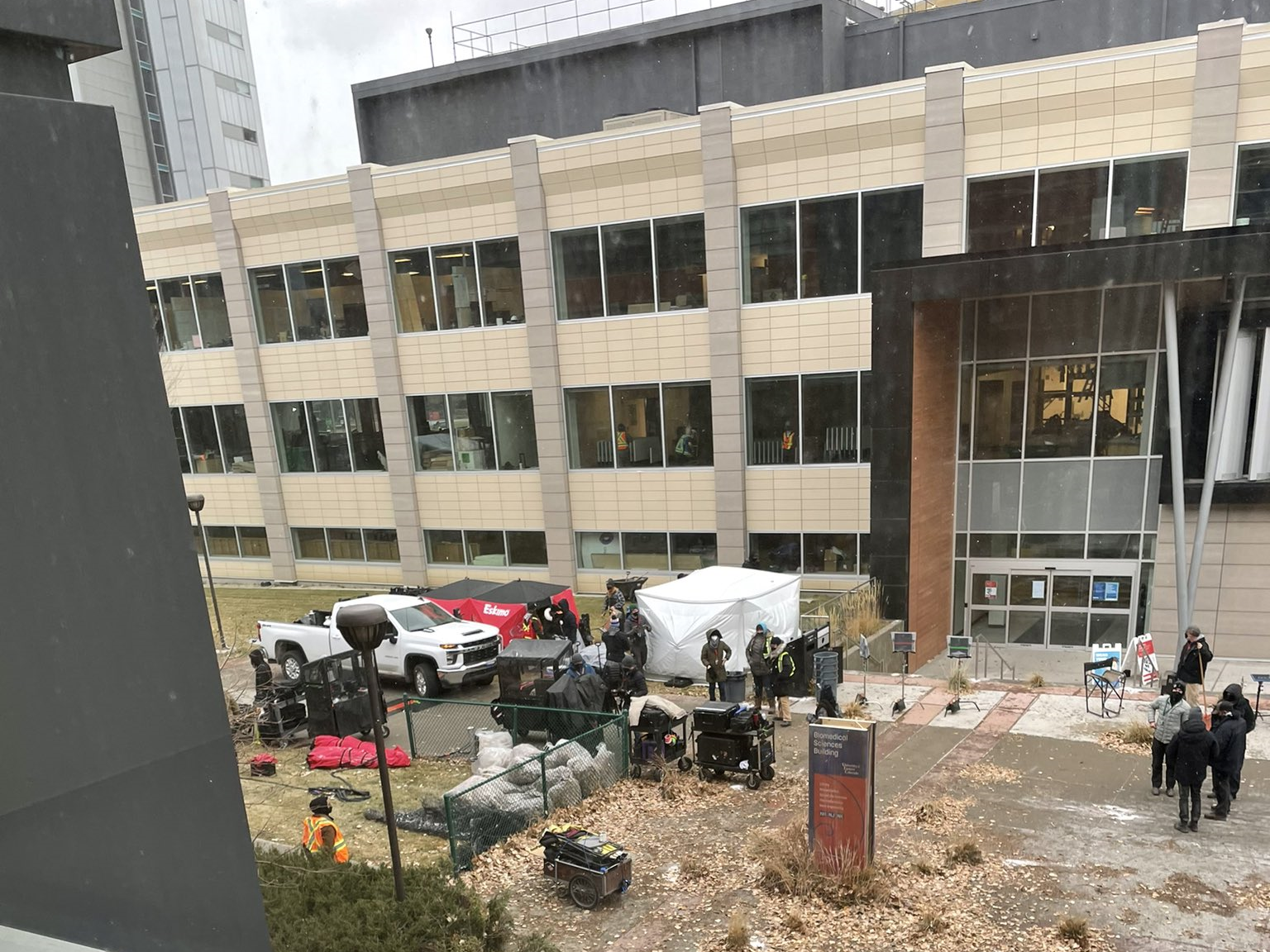
Filming took place in Canmore (left) and at the Southern Alberta Institute of Technology (right) in November 2021.

Christine A. Maier worked as cinematographer for the episode. Preparations took place in Canmore, Alberta—the stand-in for Jackson—from November 1–16, 2021, followed by production from November 15–20, with Pascal, Ramsey, and Luna present on set; several horses and around 300 extras were used. Most businesses in the town signed agreements regarding the show's impact, with the production paying between CA$1,000 and CA$1,500 per day. Willow Lane Barn near Olds, Alberta, was used for filming in some Jackson scenes.

Production designer John Paino wanted Jackson to show the "natural beauty" of the Midwest to contrast with the previous locations' "concrete". His team built greenhouses and stables on empty parking lots and added details to existing buildings in Canmore. The 30-foot-tall (9.1 m) log wall was built on a major street; it needed to be opened to allow traffic to pass. The Hollywood Reporter later named Canmore a famous "travel hotspot" due to its use in the episode. Joel and Tommy's bar conversation was filmed at the Wainwright Hotel in Heritage Park Historical Village, which Paino felt "fit the Western rustic thing". In late November, filming occurred at Mount Royal University and the Southern Alberta Institute of Technology (SAIT), recreating the fictional University of Eastern Colorado. Snow was removed and foliage added to produce an autumnal setting. Žbanić completed production on December 9.

== Reception ==
=== Broadcast and ratings ===
The episode aired on HBO on February 19, 2023. The episode had 7.8 million viewers in the United States on its first night, including linear viewers and streams on HBO Max. On linear television, it had 841,000 viewers, with a 0.28 ratings share. On HBO Max, it was streamed for approximately 759.6 million minutes from February 20 to 26. Viewers noticed two shots in which production members were briefly visible; they were digitally erased from the episode several days later.

=== Critical response ===
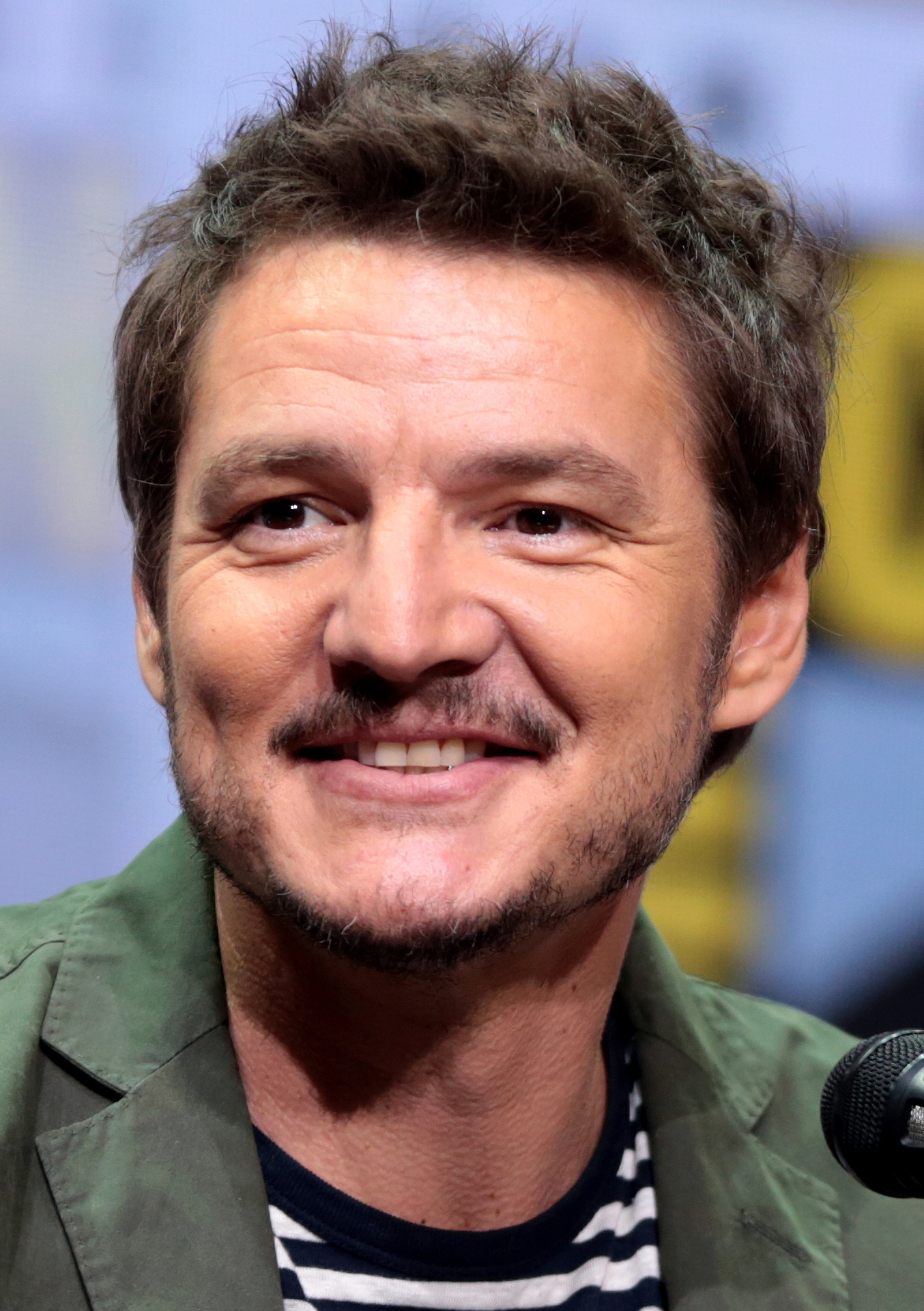
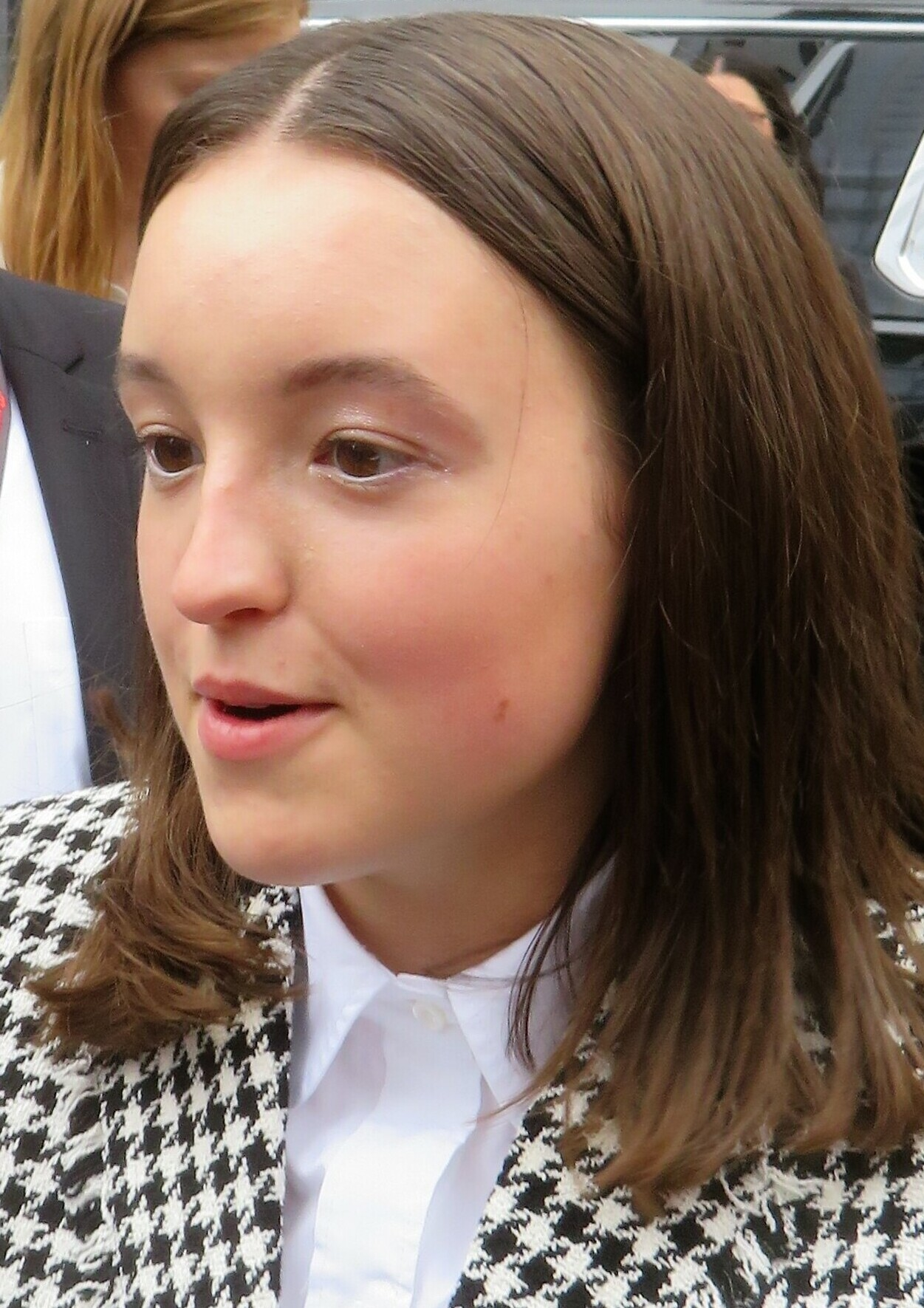
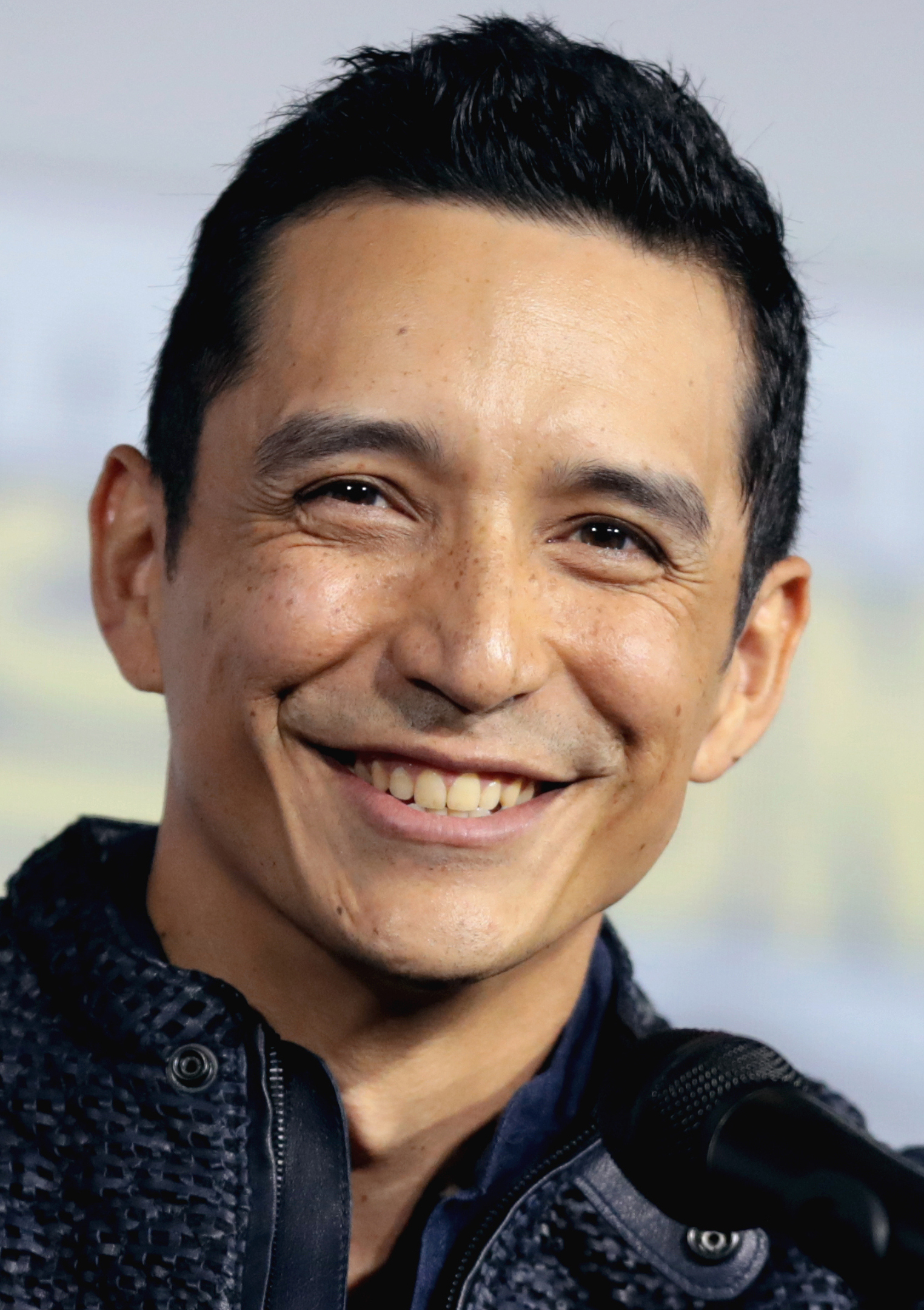
The performances of Pedro Pascal, Bella Ramsey, and Gabriel Luna (L–R) were praised by critics.

On review aggregator Rotten Tomatoes, "Kin" has an approval rating of 100% based on 31 reviews, with an average rating of 8.8/10. The website's critical consensus called the episode "a relatively gentle installment that spotlights some of Pedro Pascal's most arresting work yet". IndieWire's Steve Greene felt Jackson's presentation benefited from Žbanić's direction; The A.V. Club's David Cote praised her control of the episode's varying tones and wrote "Kin" was "probably the most visually gorgeous episode so far". IGN's Simon Cardy favorably compared the cinematography to classic Western films like The Searchers (1956) and True Grit (1969).

Den of Geek's Bernard Boo called Pascal and Ramsey's performances "possibly the best ... of their respective careers". Pascal submitted the episode to support his nomination for Lead Actor in a Drama Series at the 75th Primetime Emmy Awards. TVLine named him the Performer of the Week, citing his emotions and physicality; Push Square's Aaron Bayne opined Pascal balanced "stoic masculinity with tender vulnerability", and The A.V. Club's Cote lauded his monologue to Tommy. Joel's panic attack became an Internet meme about anxiety and fear. io9's Germain Lussier felt Ramsey's performance shone in Ellie and Joel's confrontation, and IGN's Cardy praised their ability to switch between emotion and comedy. Critics enjoyed Pascal and Luna's chemistry, and Push Square's Bayne considered Luna's performance "a wonderful counter to Joel", citing the familial bond and underlying tension. The Washington Post's Gene Park praised Wesley, Greene, and Miles; Polygon's Pete Volk considered the latter two the standout and wanted more.

Critics lauded Mazin's writing. io9's Lussier found the episode's focus on survival encapsulated the best qualities of the series. Total Film's Bradley Russell praised the script's use of humor and interactions between Joel and Tommy, and, while resolved too neatly, considered Joel and Ellie's confrontation among the show's best moments to date. The A.V. Club's Cote similarly commended Mazin's humor, emotions, and economic use of dialogue. The Verge's Alex Cranz appreciated the improved pacing by omitting the game's action sequences. The Escapist's Darren Mooney and Inverse's Dais Johnston applauded the recognition of communism in Jackson as a refreshing subversion of post-apocalyptic stories. Several critics admired the inclusion of a menstrual cup, noting feminine hygiene is often unacknowledged in the genre. IGN's Cardy and Push Square's Bayne found the ending slightly rushed despite the high quality elsewhere.
