= Left Behind (The Last of Us) =

- The Last of Us episode
- Ellie watches as Riley switches on the mall's electricity. The background was created using visual effects; critics praised the color and lighting, and its similarities to the game.
- Episode no.: Season 1 Episode 7
- Directed by: Liza Johnson
- Written by: Neil Druckmann
- Cinematography by: Ksenia Sereda
- Editing by: Timothy A. Good; Emily Mendez
- Original air date: February 26, 2023
- Running time: 55 minutes

Guest appearances
- Storm Reid as Riley Abel; Terry Chen as Captain Kwong

Episode chronology
← Previous "Kin"	Next → "When We Are in Need"
- The Last of Us season 1

"Left Behind" is the seventh episode of the first season of the American post-apocalyptic drama television series The Last of Us. Written by series co-creator Neil Druckmann and directed by Liza Johnson, it aired on HBO on February 26, 2023. In the episode, Ellie (Bella Ramsey) searches for supplies to save Joel (Pedro Pascal). A flashback follows Ellie as she spends time with her best friend Riley Abel (Storm Reid) in Boston.

The episode is adapted from The Last of Us: Left Behind (2014), an expansion pack to the video game on which the series is based. Johnson, who played the game after being assigned to direct, was encouraged to take an original approach. The episode was filmed in January and February 2022 in Calgary, Alberta. It received positive reviews, with praise for its writing, direction, cinematography, and performances of Ramsey and Reid; the latter won at the Black Reel Awards and Primetime Creative Arts Emmy Awards. The episode was watched by 7.7 million viewers on its first day.

== Plot ==
As Ellie tends to Joel's wound, (Note: Joel was stabbed and passed out at the end of "Kin".) Joel demands Ellie abandon him to die. As she begins to walk away, Ellie stops and recalls the events that led up to her getting bitten.

Several months earlier, in Boston, Massachusetts, Ellie is an orphaned student at a military boarding school run by the Federal Disaster Response Agency (FEDRA). After Ellie gets in a fight, Captain Kwong encourages her to follow the rules to eventually become a FEDRA officer. Later that night, Ellie's best friend Riley Abel sneaks into her room. Ellie is angry with Riley for joining the Fireflies—a rebel group opposing FEDRA—and leaving her alone at the school for weeks.

Riley takes Ellie to an abandoned mall. Ellie is overjoyed to experience an escalator, carousel, photo booth, and arcade with Riley. When Ellie finds Riley's bed and homemade bombs, she confronts Riley about the Fireflies' violent philosophies. Riley reveals the Fireflies are moving her to the Atlanta Quarantine Zone, and she brought Ellie to the mall to say goodbye. Ellie initially storms out of the mall, but returns to Riley. The two dance together and Ellie desperately pleads with Riley not to leave. Riley agrees, and they kiss.

An infected, drawn to the noise, attacks the pair. Ellie eventually kills it, but is horrified to realize both she and Riley have been bitten. Riley suggests they let themselves turn together, arguing that no matter how little time together they have left, it is worth fighting for. In the present, Ellie recalls Riley's words. She finds a needle and thread and starts to sew Joel's wound.

== Production ==
=== Conception and writing ===
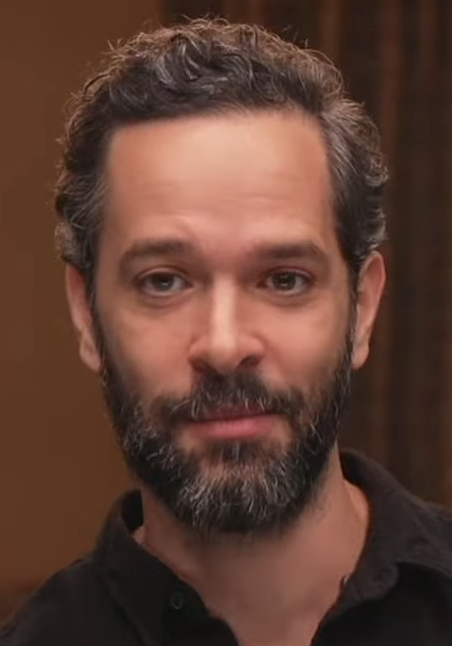
The episode was written by series co-creator Neil Druckmann.

"Left Behind" was written by The Last of Us series co-creator Neil Druckmann and directed by Liza Johnson. The Directors Guild of Canada revealed Johnson was assigned to direct for the series in January 2022. Johnson played the game after being assigned to the series. "Left Behind" is an adaptation of The Last of Us: Left Behind (2014), an expansion pack of the video game on which the series is based. Druckmann and series co-creator Craig Mazin encouraged Johnson and cinematographer Ksenia Sereda to take liberties with the episode and not feel constrained to replicating the source material.

For Riley's first appearance in the comic book The Last of Us: American Dreams, artist Faith Erin Hicks and developers at Naughty Dog created an original fictional arcade game, The Turning, to circumvent issues with licensing; for the television series, Druckmann and Mazin were able to use Mortal Kombat II (1993), (Note: Mortal Kombat publisher Warner Bros. Games is a subdivision of Warner Bros. Discovery, the parent company of The Last of Us network HBO.) the game on which The Turning was based. Druckmann and Mazin avoided positioning any faction as purely good or evil, and showed the more positive side of FEDRA in "Left Behind" to juxtapose their negative depictions in the first episode. The episode was originally written without any reference to Joel; producers at HBO requested a connection to the main story, like Left Behind had.

=== Casting and characters ===
Storm Reid's casting as Riley was announced on January 14, 2022. Reid was unfamiliar with the game prior to her casting; when approached to star in the show, she asked family and friends for their opinions on the game. She watched snippets of gameplay to understand the emotion, but otherwise avoided the game to ensure an original take on the role; she wanted to "hone in on" the manner in which Riley moves and "took up space". Reid worked on the series for about a month. She found the episode's portrayal of children refreshing as it had been absent from recent episodes.

Bella Ramsey, who portrays Ellie, found Ellie and Riley's chemistry relatable and noted it made their performance easier. Ramsey and Reid had little time to bond prior to production. They became close over the course of production; Reid called Ramsey "Mom" in one take. The scene at the arcade was improvised; Ramsey and Reid were playing a working version of Mortal Kombat II. Ramsey had not watched Ellie's infection scene prior to their performance, and afterwards noted their version was more angry than the game's fearful. Reid found the final scene emotional to perform as it was one of the last filmed. Ramsey encountered some difficulty with the school scenes as they had not attended school since they started acting when they were eleven.

=== Music ===
A-ha's song "Take On Me" is used as Ellie discovers the escalator. A cover version of the song was previously used in a trailer for the series, and Ellie (played by Ashley Johnson) performs the song in the video game The Last of Us Part II (2020). Following its use in the episode, "Take On Me" ranked first on Billboard's Top TV Songs chart for February. Collider's Julio Bardini found the song's earlier lyrics reflected Ellie and Riley's feelings towards each other, while the later lyrics illustrated Ellie's journey after discovering her immunity:

Needless to say
I'm odds and ends
But I'll be stumbling away
Slowly learning that life is okay
Say after me
It's no better to be safe than sorry

Druckmann chose the song "All or None" by Pearl Jam as it represented Ellie's loneliness and uncomfortability, and the title reflected her general attitude in life. The inclusion of the Rockabye Baby! (2006) version of "Just Like Heaven" was a suggestion of co-editor Timothy A. Good, who had been wanting to use it for some time. Etta James's version of "I Got You Babe" was reused from the game; Druckmann felt the song's romantic lyrics hidden by joyous music mirrored the feelings of Ellie and Riley. "All or None" saw an increase of more than 5,000% in global Spotify streams within 24 hours of the episode airing, while "I Got You Babe" saw a 44% increase.

=== Filming ===
Production designer John Paino hoped to find an American-style mall within Calgary for production, having spent much of his childhood in malls. The crew was granted permission to transform the Northland Village Mall for production as it was scheduled for demolition. Decoration of the mall took place in January 2022, with dried leaves, broken pylons, and other debris. Paino and his team built around 20 to 25 storefronts in the mall, each rundown versions of real businesses such as Foot Locker, Panda Express, and Victoria's Secret. It was unsuitable for some shots as it mostly consisted of a single story, rather than two stories like the area in the game, prompting the usage of a soundstage and visual effects; the background of the shot in which the lighting is switched on was crafted through visual effects, for which Mazin and Druckmann had several meetings with visual effects supervisor Alex Wang.

The carousel—the Chinook Carousel, manufactured by the Allan Herschell Company in 1941—was rented from Spruce Meadows and set up at Northland Village Mall for filming; center panels referencing the Calgary Stampede were replaced by reflective panels to add a "hallucinatory feel". The arcade consisted of real arcade machines like Frogger (1981) and Tetris (1985), as Mazin and Druckmann wanted to evoke realism; the cathode-ray tube screens were replaced by light-emitting diodes to allow a clear image when filmed. Sereda used three simultaneous cameras for the arcade sequence, allowing editors Timothy A. Good and Emily Mendez to easily cross-cut between takes. Abandoned stores at the mall were used as green rooms for actors. Production moved in Okotoks in January, with added trees, grass, and snow; filming occurred in February.

=== Post-production ===
"Left Behind" was edited by Timothy A. Good and Emily Mendez. Mendez had been Good's assistant editor on the season's third episode. Good showed her work to Mazin, and they agreed for Mendez to co-edit "Left Behind"; the expansion pack was her favorite part of the games and Good felt Mendez, as a lesbian, would respond to the material more authentically and sensitively. Good assigned her the dance and kiss scenes as he thought she would do a better job; his favorite of her edits was her decision to maintain the shot of Ellie's reaction after the kiss, which he thought other editors would have avoided. Mendez's favorite work on the season was the dance scene.

Good and Mendez felt, as gay people, they understood Ellie's intense emotions and focused on Ramsey's performance to highlight Ellie's feelings for viewers. They wanted to show that Ellie expressed her love while externally suppressing her emotions by "playing it cool". Based on Mazin and Druckmann's briefs, Good and Mendez positioned Riley as Ellie's equal; they sought to simultaneously introduce the character as well as Ellie's feelings for her "while trying to not make it too obvious". Good was concerned the flashback sequences required more context clues but ultimately found it more interesting to allow the audience to decipher the mystery.

== Reception ==
=== Broadcast and ratings ===
The episode aired on HBO on February 26, 2023. The episode had 7.7 million viewers in the United States on its first night, including linear viewers and streams on HBO Max. On linear television, it had 1.083 million viewers, with a 0.37 ratings share. On HBO Max, it was streamed for approximately 261 million minutes within its first three hours. According to several viewers, Ellie and Riley's kiss was censored on OSN+ in the MENA region.

=== Critical response ===
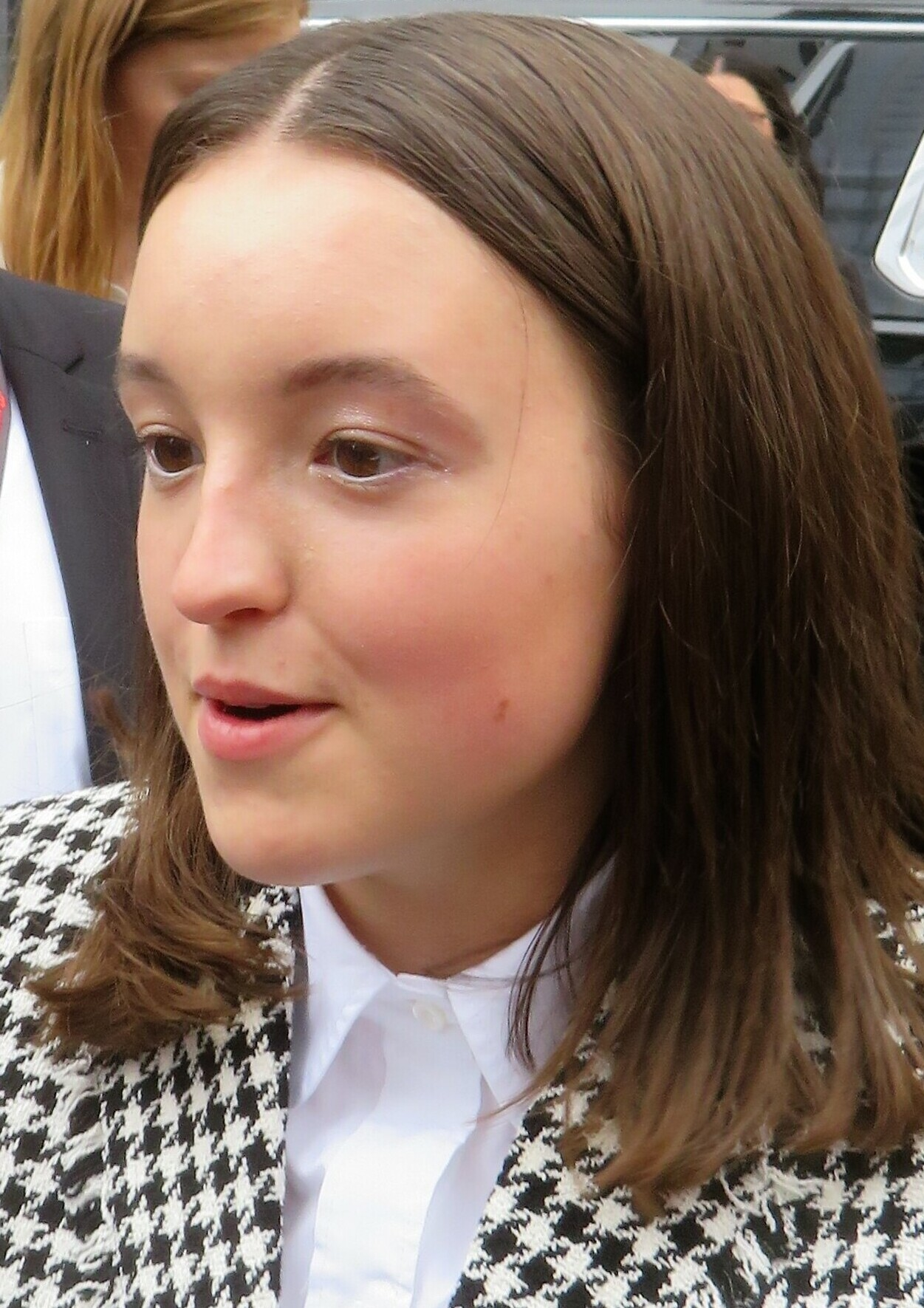
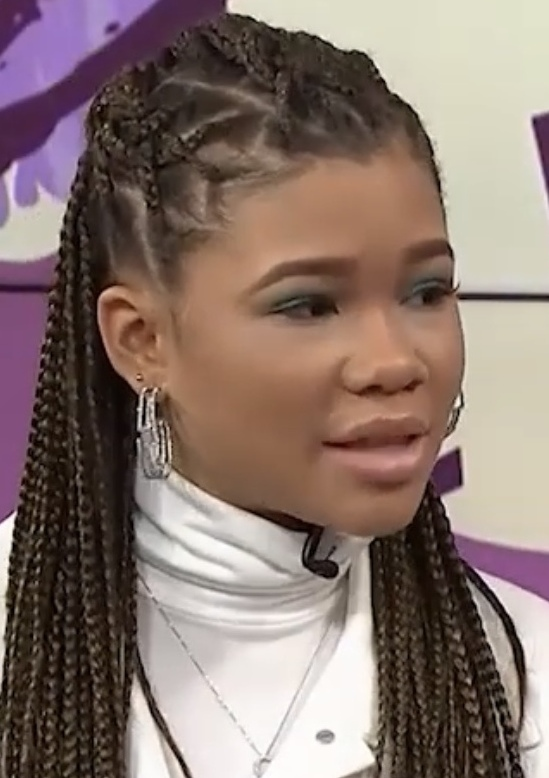
The performances of Bella Ramsey (left) and Storm Reid (right) were widely praised by critics, and the latter won awards at the Black Reel Awards and Primetime Emmy Awards.

On review aggregator Rotten Tomatoes, "Left Behind" has an approval rating of 97% based on 32 reviews, with an average rating of 8.4/10. The website's critical consensus called it a "heartbreaking duet between Bella Ramsey and Storm Reid". Several critics praised the visuals of the mall; Den of Geek's Bernard Boo enjoyed the blend of artificiality and romance, and Push Square's Aaron Bayne applauded its similarities to the game. Total Film's Bradley Russell found the opening sequence ethereal, mirroring Joel's fading consciousness. The A.V. Club's David Cote lauded the fight sequence as the best close-combat scene in the series to date. The episode's use of music was well received.

Ramsey and Reid's performances received praise; Bleeding Cool's Tom Chang called them "award-worthy". Several critics found their chemistry convincing and the episode's highlight. Bleeding Cool's Chang and /Film's Rafael Motamayor considered the episode Ramsey's strongest to date, and IGN's Simon Cardy and Push Square's Bayne found it an effective showcase of their acting talents. Total Film's Bradley Russell lauded Ramsey's reaction of Ellie's infection, particularly following their quieter reactions earlier. /Film's Motamayor wrote Reid "gives a memorable performance that ... sticks with you long after the credits roll", and Push Square's Bayne felt she effectively captured Riley's sense of "youthful pride". Bleeding Cool's Chang felt the performances benefited from Johnson's experience in directing female-led drama series. For her performance, Reid won Outstanding Guest Actress at the 75th Primetime Creative Arts Emmy Awards and Outstanding Guest Performance in a Drama Series at the 7th Annual Black Reel Awards for Television.

IGN's Cardy called the episode a "beautifully faithful adaptation". The Atlantic's Shirley Li considered the story a "quiet celebration of the world that once existed". Den of Geek's Boo found the present-day scenes short and poetic. io9's Germain Lussier praised the use of flashbacks to contextualize Ellie's predicament in the present as "a stroke of genius", and lauded Ellie's reactions to the mall lights and arcade; The Escapist's Darren Mooney similarly found Ellie and Riley's reactions impactful. Slate's Nadira Goffe applauded the use of a mall as a quintessential coming-of-age setting. Total Film's Bradley Russell found the resolve of the previous episode's cliffhanger abrupt, and the ending of the episode rushed in comparison to previous scenes. Kotaku's Kenneth Shepard felt the replacement of The Turning with Mortal Kombat II was corporate-led and failed to recreate one of the game's strongest scenes. /Film's Motamayor wrote the episode suffered the trope of black characters dying only to motivate white characters.
