= Please Hold to My Hand =

- The Last of Us episode
- Joel trusts Ellie enough to allow her a gun. One of few interiors in the show filmed on location, the scene was praised for Pedro Pascal and Bella Ramsey's performances.
- Episode no.: Season 1 Episode 4
- Directed by: Jeremy Webb
- Written by: Craig Mazin
- Cinematography by: Eben Bolter
- Editing by: Timothy A. Good
- Original air date: February 5, 2023
- Running time: 45 minutes

Guest appearances
- Lamar Johnson as Henry Burrell; Melanie Lynskey as Kathleen Coghlan; Keivonn Montreal Woodard as Sam; Jeffrey Pierce as Perry; John Getz as Edelstein; Juan Magana as Bryan

Episode chronology
← Previous "Long, Long Time"	Next → "Endure and Survive"
- The Last of Us season 1

"Please Hold to My Hand" is the fourth episode of the first season of the American post-apocalyptic drama television series The Last of Us. Written by series co-creator Craig Mazin and directed by Jeremy Webb, it aired on HBO on February 5, 2023. In the episode, Joel (Pedro Pascal) and Ellie (Bella Ramsey) encounter an ambush in Kansas City, Missouri. Elsewhere in the city, resistance leader Kathleen (Melanie Lynskey), her second-in-command Perry (Jeffrey Pierce), and their group search for Henry (Lamar Johnson) and his brother Sam (Keivonn Montreal Woodard).

Kansas City replaced Pittsburgh, as seen in the video game on which the series is based, as Mazin found the production location in Calgary more closely resembled the city and the distance to Kansas City justified additional character development. The writers felt adapting to television allowed an opportunity to explore characters like Kathleen and Perry, who were not in the game. The episode received positive reviews, with praise for its writing, direction, cinematography, and performances of Lynskey, Pascal, and Ramsey. It was watched by 7.5 million viewers on its first day.

== Plot ==
As they drive to Wyoming, Joel tells Ellie about his past with his brother Tommy: after the outbreak, they became close to a group of survivors traveling to Boston, where they met Tess and Marlene. Tommy, always looking for something to fight for, was easily recruited to the Fireflies, but later gave up on their cause and struck out on his own. Camping in the woods for the night, Joel warns Ellie not to trust anyone they meet. The next day, they reach the ruins of Kansas City, Missouri. The highway is blocked, forcing them to take a detour into the city. Ellie sees a man begging for help, but Joel recognizes this to be an ambush and drives past him. A brick breaks the truck's window, a spike strip punctures the tires, and the truck careens into a laundromat.

Ellie hides as Joel kills two men with a rifle. A third—Bryan—gets the drop on him. As Bryan chokes Joel, Ellie takes the handgun from her backpack (Note: Unbeknownst to Joel, Ellie hid a gun in her backpack in "Long, Long Time".) and shoots Bryan in the back, paralyzing him from the waist down. Joel confiscates her gun and sends her away before fatally stabbing Bryan as he screams for mercy. Joel and Ellie escape as more hostile survivors—part of a group that overthrew the government and took control of the city—find the bodies. Their leader, Kathleen Coghlan, is informed of the events. She openly postulates her enemies—including Henry Burrell who she believes ratted out her brother to be executed—are responsible for contacting the killers, and orders her followers to search the city. Meanwhile, Joel teaches Ellie how to properly hold her gun and agrees to let her carry it.

Kathleen's second-in-command, Perry, shows her a vacated room where Henry had been living. The floor of the basement-level storage room is buckling, and something is moving underground. Perry insists they deal with the problem, but Kathleen orders him to hide the evidence until they find Henry. Joel locates a high-rise building where they can get a good view of the surrounding area and find an escape route. Lying down to sleep in one of the apartments, one of Ellie's jokes makes Joel laugh for the first time.

Abruptly awoken by Ellie's voice, Joel finds a man and his young brother (Note: Identified off-screen as Henry and Sam, respectively) holding them at gunpoint.

== Production ==
=== Conception and writing ===
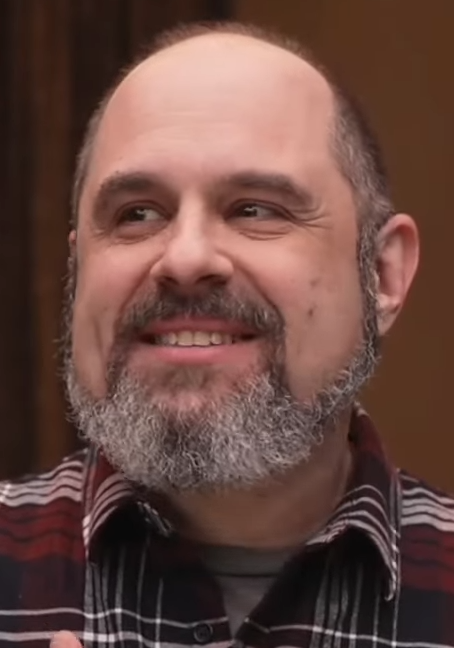
The episode was written by series co-creator Craig Mazin.

"Please Hold to My Hand" was written by The Last of Us series co-creator Craig Mazin and directed by Jeremy Webb. The Directors Guild of Canada revealed Webb was assigned to direct for the series in January 2022. In the episode, Kansas City replaces Pittsburgh as seen in the video game on which the series is based. Mazin found the production locations in Canada more closely imitated Kansas City and felt Pittsburgh was not important enough to the story to justify the difficulty in manufacturing it. Co-creator Neil Druckmann, who wrote and co-directed the video game, considered it a superficial change as the characters are more important than the location. He and Mazin felt the additional distance to Kansas City justified the story beats and character development. Mazin enjoyed the use of Ellie's joke book in the game and felt its inclusion in the series allowed effective development between her and Joel. Mazin found Joel's decision to allow Ellie to use a gun demonstrated his trust in her, and considered it "the most father-daughter moment they've had".

=== Casting and characters ===
In August, Lamar Johnson and Keivonn Montreal Woodard's casting as Henry and Sam was announced alongside the confirmation of Kansas City replacing Pittsburgh. Jeffrey Pierce's casting as Perry was announced on July 15; Pierce previously portrayed Tommy in the video games. He reached out to Druckmann to offer his support for the series and "was lucky that something came up that fit"; he auditioned for a different role three times but Mazin and Druckmann felt his performance was unbelievable "as a victim", ultimately offering him the role of Perry about a week later. Perry is an original character in the show who, according to Pierce, "has huge implications for things" that occurred in the game. The script described him as a former military member.

Melanie Lynskey's casting as Kathleen was announced alongside a teaser trailer for the series in September 2022. Kathleen is an original character created by Mazin as the leader of a group of hunters who appeared in the game. Druckmann found following antagonistic characters made the story more interesting, allowing an understanding and justification of their actions, as opposed to being seen as "obstacles" like in the game. Mazin compared Kathleen to Madame Defarge from Charles Dickens's A Tale of Two Cities (1859): a revolutionary who becomes terroristic due to cruel circumstances, which allows the audience to empathize.

Mazin, who was friends with Lynskey, reached out to her about the role and described the character as "a war criminal". She was initially hesitant until Mazin pitched more about the character, describing her as someone who was forced into a role after the death of her brother, who "was basically Jesus". She could relate to the character's motivations due to her relationship with her four siblings. Mazin and Druckmann felt her casting was unusual as she has a "sweetness" that conflicts with Kathleen's position in the episode, an intentional decision to intrigue the audience; Lynskey wanted to play the character as "soft spoken and delicate" to juxtapose her violence. She felt Kathleen was likely less intense prior to her brother's death but was forced to become hardened due to her circumstances. In response to a comment from Adrianne Curry stating Kathleen's "body says life of luxury...not post apocolyptic [sic] warlord", Lynskey wrote the character was meant to be intelligent rather than muscly. She later added she wanted to portray the character as "feminine, and soft-voiced, and all the things that we've been told are 'weak'", noting she was hoping to subvert expectations.

=== Music ===
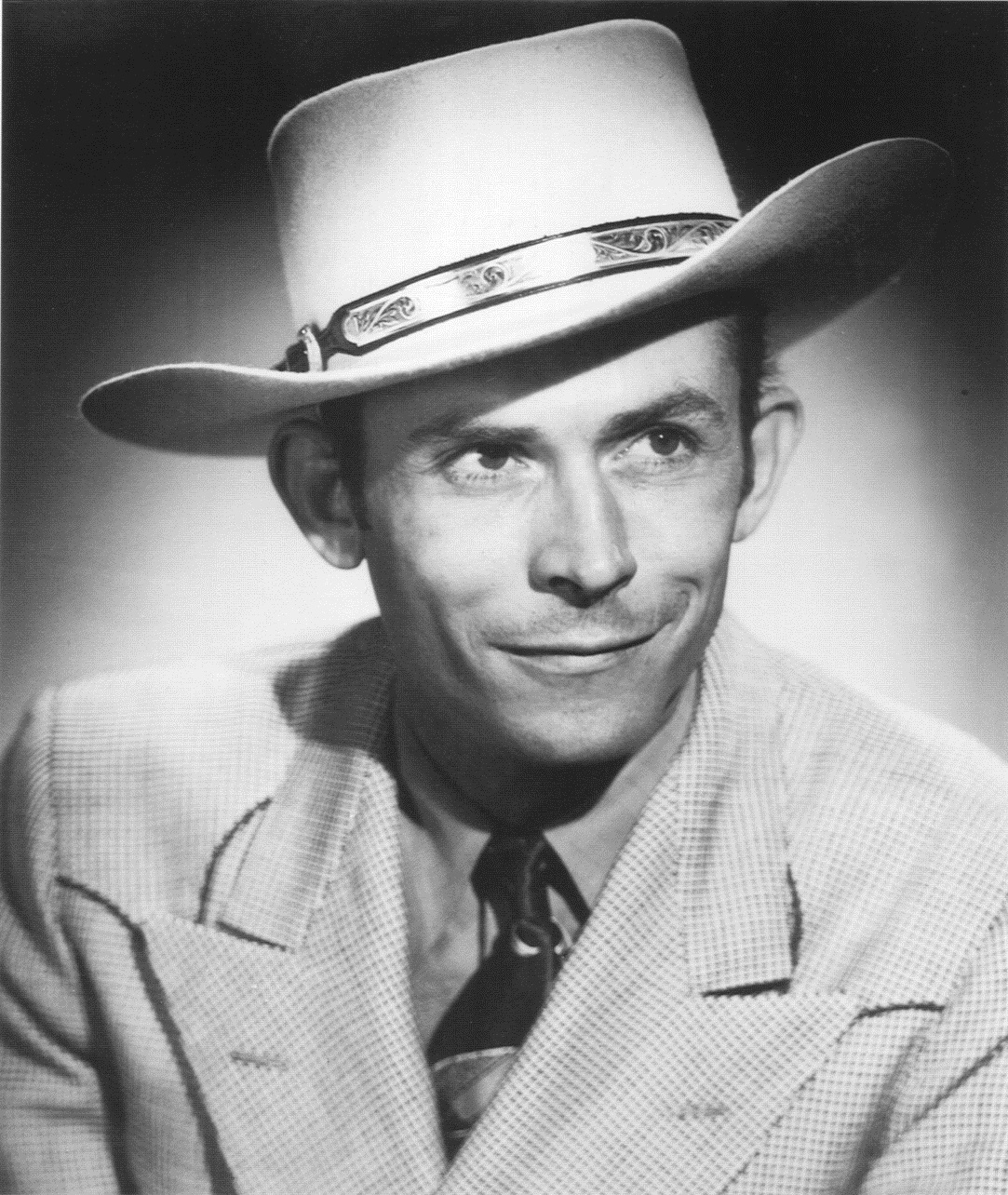
The episode title references the lyrics of Hank Williams's "Alone and Forsaken", which is played during the episode and in the video game.

The episode's title references the lyrics of "Alone and Forsaken" by Hank Williams, which Joel and Ellie play on the radio. The song was used during the same scene in the video game, as well as one of the series' trailers. GameRevolution's Daniel Falconer recognized the lyrics represented Ellie's promises to Joel and foreshadowed her apparent immaturity. The credits use Lotte Kestner's cover of "True Faith", which itself was covered by Ashley Johnson in-character as Ellie in a 2020 trailer for The Last of Us Part II. Madeline Carpou of The Mary Sue felt its inclusion reflected Ellie's character arc: her actions in the episode set her down a path towards the events of Part II. Following their use in the episode, "True Faith" and "Alone and Forsaken" and saw 640% and 660% increases in global streams on Spotify within 24 hours, and ranked sixth and seventh, respectively, on Billboard's Top TV Songs chart for February.

=== Filming ===
Eben Bolter worked as cinematographer for the episode. Some of the early scenes were filmed at the Lethbridge Viaduct and near Priddis. For the scene of Ellie testing her gun in the mirror, a hole was added to the ceiling with natural sunlight; Bolter wanted it to illuminate Ellie "without being too perfect". Calgary was used to recreate Kansas City in the episode. The production team redressed the Globe Cinema to advertise the 2003 films Matchstick Men and Underworld as an homage; the street was closed for around four days. The highway scenes were filmed at the tunnel opening of the Airport Trail in northeast Calgary, which was closed for three days in March.

The scene in which Joel and Ellie hide from the hunters was filmed in an old bar in Calgary, though the location changed several times before filming. It was one of the few times an interior in the series was filmed on location instead of a soundstage; the production team wanted the visuals of trucks driving past, which they found difficult to imitate on a soundstage. The walls were colored a "vivid" red emphasized by stained glass near the ceiling. Bolter requested newspapers on the windows to create a diffused, soft light and make the scene feel more intimate and safe. Additional photography took place on October 4 near Worlds of Fun in Kansas City, Missouri, and on Interstate 435 in Kansas City, Kansas.

== Reception ==
=== Broadcast and ratings ===
The episode aired on HBO on February 5, 2023. The episode had 7.5 million viewers in the United States on its first night, including linear viewers and streams on HBO Max—an increase of 17% from the previous week and 60% from the premiere. On linear television, it had 991,000 viewers on its first night, with a 0.26 ratings share.

=== Critical response ===
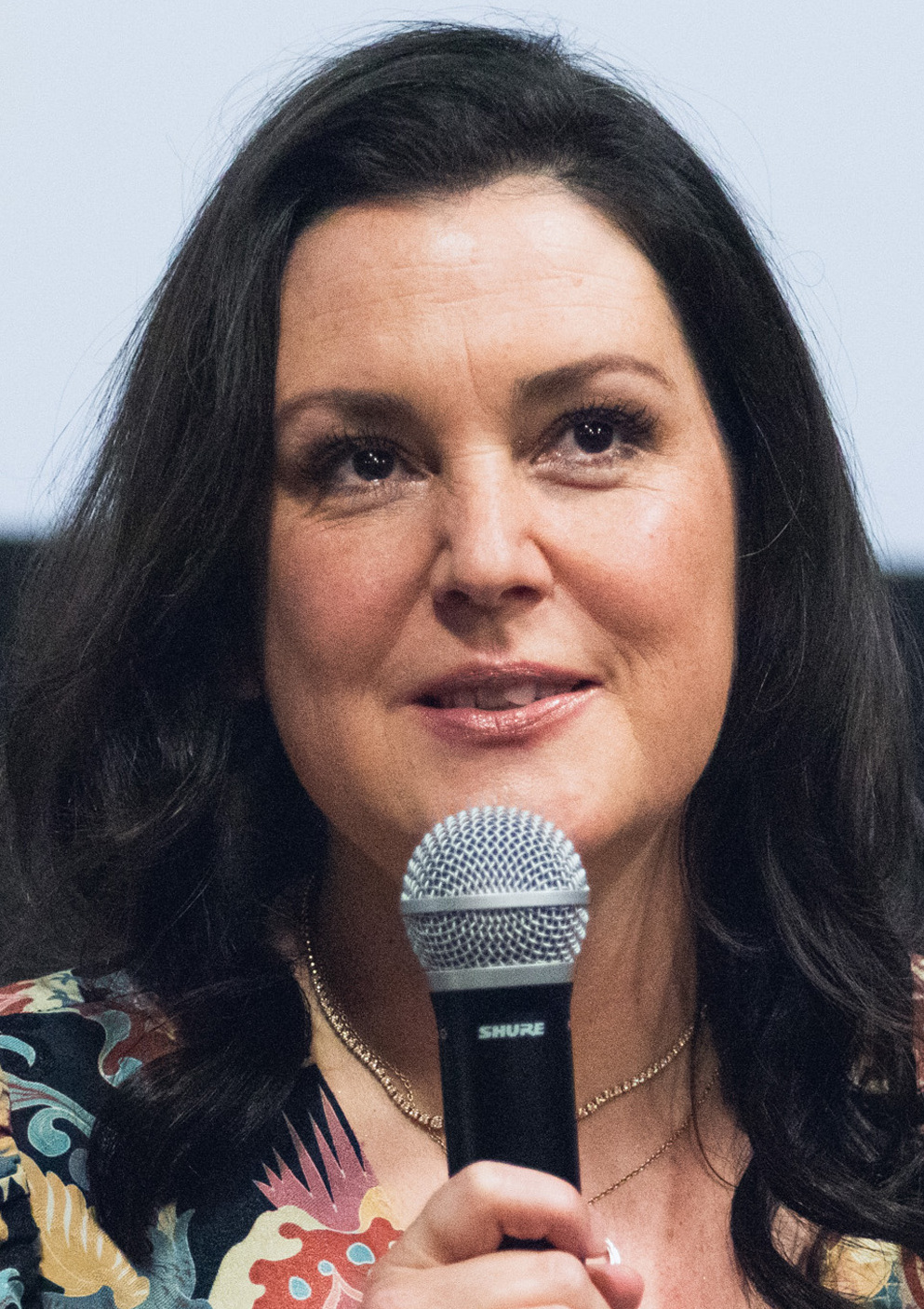
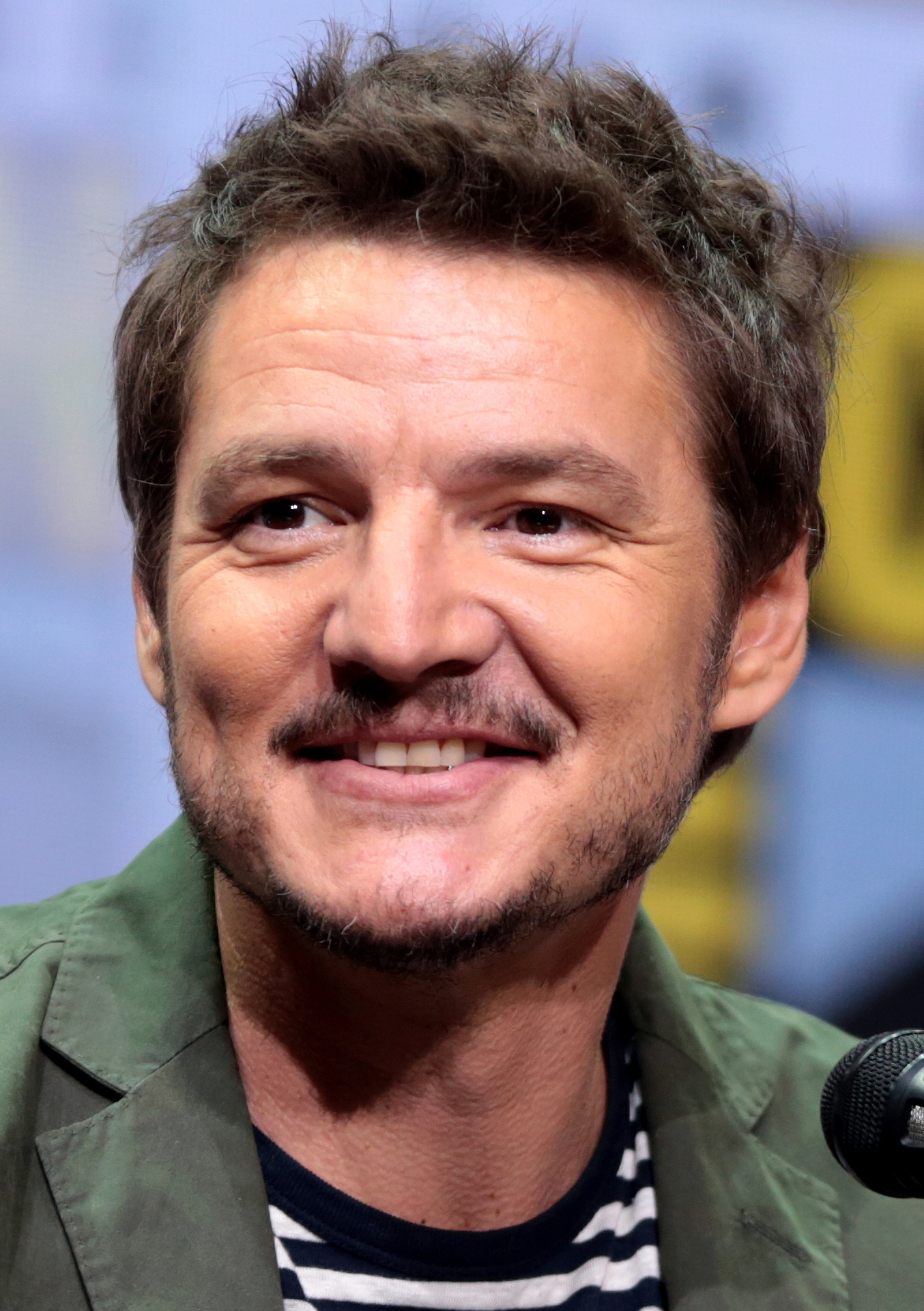
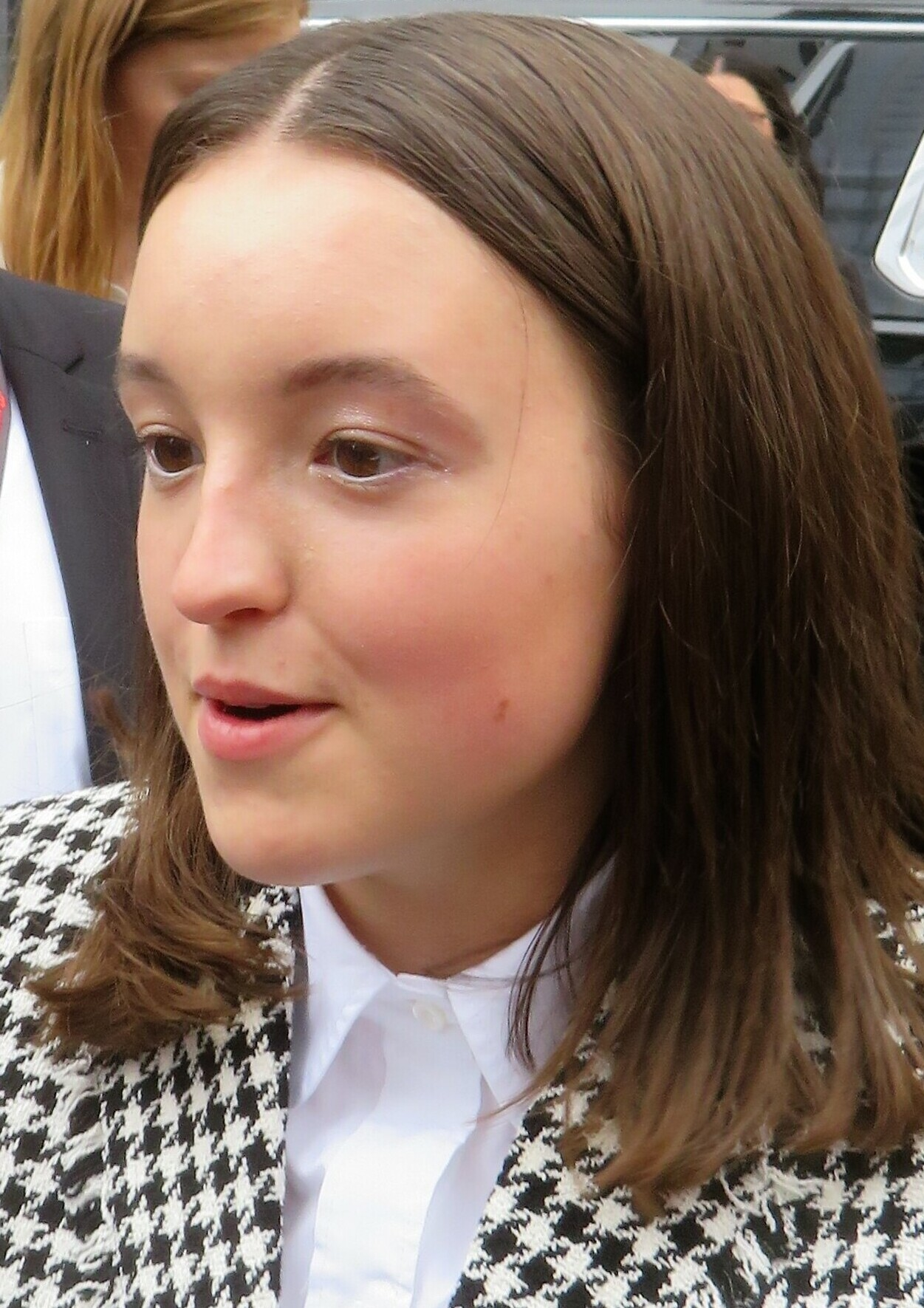
The performances of Melanie Lynskey, Pedro Pascal, and Bella Ramsey (L–R) were widely praised by critics.

On review aggregator Rotten Tomatoes, "Please Hold to My Hand" has an approval rating of 100% based on 33 reviews, with an average rating of 7.6/10. The website's critical consensus called the episode "a terse chapter that's preoccupied with setup over payoff" but "an absorbing watch all the same thanks to Joel and Ellie's budding chemistry".

Lynskey's performance received praise. Den of Geek's Bernard Boo wrote she "does a fantastic job of coming across as formidable and vicious while letting her character's humanity seep through just enough". The Escapist's Darren Mooney lauded her juxtaposition of a "domestic archetype with something more primal and violent beneath it". Total Film's Bradley Russell felt Lynskey's performance lacked the necessary intimidation, and The A.V. Club's David Cote considered her "a counterintuitive choice" for the role, adding he is "waiting to be convinced". Pedro Pascal and Bella Ramsey's performances as Joel and Ellie were praised; Den of Geek's Boo lauded their nuance in quieter moments. The A.V. Club's Cote enjoyed Pascal's warmth and humor, particularly in scenes in which he teaches Ellie, and Push Square's Aaron Bayne felt Ramsey's performance would win over viewers who doubted their casting, lauding their portrayal of both trauma and humor. The Washington Post's Gene Park similarly wrote the episode was "Ramsey's time to flex those muscles" of humor.

Push Square's Bayne found the pacing effectively blended character moments and action sequences, and wanted the episode to be longer as a result. IndieWire's Steve Greene praised Mazin and Druckmann for showing the quiet successes of Joel and Ellie's journey alongside the setbacks. IGN's Simon Cardy enjoyed the humorous moments between Joel and Ellie, though noted the episode was generally weaker as it primarily stands to set up the following one. Total Film's Russell found the character moments provided "just the right amount of levity". Den of Geek's Boo considered Kathleen and her group less interesting than the previous episode's Bill and Frank, but acknowledged their stories remained unfinished. Rolling Stone's Alan Sepinwall wrote the narrative setup, while less engaging than the previous week, was necessary considering the events of the following episode.

IGN's Cardy compared the cinematography during the ambush sequence to Emmanuel Lubezki's work in Children of Men (2006), calling it demonstrative of "the classiness on display in every aspect of the show's production". He praised the use of handheld camera movements and close-up shots to follow Joel and Ellie's movements. Push Square's Bayne lauded Webb's direction for focusing on quieter moments, and The Escapist's Mooney applauded his decision to keep the camera on Ellie and Kathleen when they fire their guns. The New York Times's Noel Murray commended John Paino's production design, "from the trashed gas stations to the wreckage-strewn Kansas City streets".
