= Long, Long Time (The Last of Us) =

- The Last of Us episode
- The final crane shot of Bill and Frank's bedroom was inspired by the video game's title screen, signifying promise and loss and allowing a final moment with the characters.
- Episode no.: Season 1 Episode 3
- Directed by: Peter Hoar
- Written by: Craig Mazin
- Cinematography by: Eben Bolter
- Editing by: Timothy A. Good
- Original air date: January 29, 2023
- Running time: 75 minutes

Guest appearances
- Anna Torv as Tess; Nick Offerman as Bill; Murray Bartlett as Frank

Episode chronology
← Previous "Infected"	Next → "Please Hold to My Hand"
- The Last of Us season 1

"Long, Long Time" is the third episode of the first season of the American post-apocalyptic drama television series The Last of Us. Written by series co-creator Craig Mazin and directed by Peter Hoar, it aired on HBO on January 29, 2023. In the episode, Joel (Pedro Pascal) and Ellie (Bella Ramsey) travel to Lincoln, Massachusetts, to find Bill (Nick Offerman). Flashbacks follow Bill over twenty years as he survives in his town and meets his partner Frank (Murray Bartlett). The episode's title is taken from the 1970 song by Linda Ronstadt, which plays an important role in Bill and Frank's relationship.

Mazin wanted to expand on Bill's story from the video game; he felt it allowed a deeper look at love, happiness, and the passage of time. Filming for the episode took place in the former Beachwood area of High River, Alberta, in September 2021; production designer John Paino and his team constructed the town of Lincoln in around six to twelve weeks. Critics overwhelmingly considered the episode the season's best, with Offerman and Bartlett's performances, Mazin's writing, and Hoar's direction receiving particular praise. It was watched by 6.4 million viewers on its first day. The episode received several awards, including Hoar for Outstanding Directing at the Directors Guild of America Awards and Offerman for Outstanding Guest Actor at the Creative Arts Emmy Awards, for which Bartlett was also nominated.

== Plot ==
Traveling on foot to Lincoln, Massachusetts, Joel searches for his stashed provisions while Ellie enters the basement and stabs a trapped infected to death. Encountering a mass grave, Joel explains the military culled some survivors to conserve food and living space.

Twenty years earlier, in Lincoln, Bill monitors the evacuation from an underground bunker after the outbreak. He ransacks abandoned businesses for supplies and materials to build a generator, electric fence, and traps. Four years later, he encounters Frank who bargains for a hot meal, shower, and fresh clothes. They play "Long Long Time" on the piano. Frank deduces Bill has never had a romantic partner. He kisses Bill and they sleep together. Three years later, Frank invites Tess and Joel to establish a smuggling operation. Joel convinces Bill to accept Frank's plan by pointing out deficiencies in the town's defenses they can help fix. Later, raiders attempt to infiltrate the town, injuring Bill before being repelled by his defenses.

Ten years later, Bill and Frank are elderly. Frank has a degenerative disease which leaves him with limited mobility. He asks Bill to help him die. Bill takes Frank to dress in new suits and they marry in their living room. After dinner, Bill places a lethal dose of sleeping tablets in Frank's wine and reveals he spiked his own drink as well, admitting he has no desire to live without Frank. They retire to their room.

Several weeks later, Joel and Ellie reach Lincoln. Ellie finds a letter from Bill addressed to Joel, leaving him his truck, weapons, and any supplies he needs. In the letter, Bill describes how protecting and caring for Frank gave him a purpose, and that both he and Joel have a mission to save and protect the worthy. When Joel realizes Bill was referring to Tess, he becomes emotional. He and Ellie agree to travel to Wyoming in Bill's truck to find Tommy who may be able to help transport Ellie to the Fireflies. Joel sets new rules for Ellie: neither of them is to bring up Tess or their histories, Ellie is to keep her condition a secret, and she has to follow Joel's orders. They stockpile from Bill's stash. Unbeknownst to Joel, Ellie finds a gun and hides it in her backpack. The two drive away with "Long Long Time" playing on cassette.

== Production ==
=== Conception and writing ===
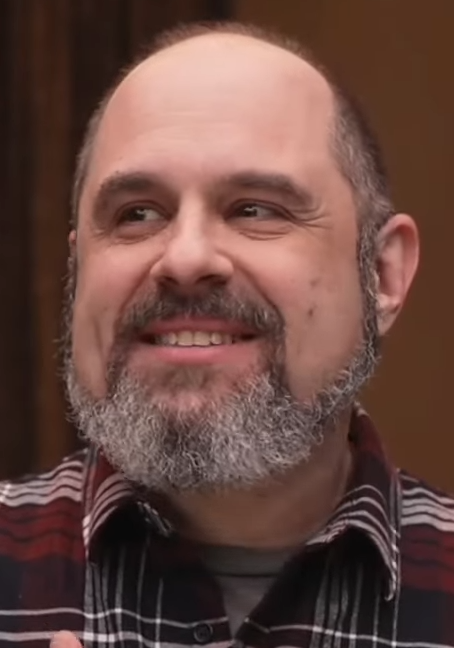
The episode was written by series co-creator Craig Mazin.

"Long, Long Time" was written by The Last of Us series co-creator Craig Mazin and directed by Peter Hoar. The Directors Guild of Canada revealed Hoar was assigned to direct an episode in July 2021. Hoar had played The Last of Us (2013), the video game on which the series is based, but not its sequel The Last of Us Part II (2020). He "dreamed about being part of" the series after it was announced, and was contacted by executive producer Rose Lam about directing an episode. Rotten Tomatoes revealed the episode's title in December 2022. Mazin wanted the episode to be "a break from fear" of the previous episodes, exploring hopefulness without the constant threat of danger. Mazin mapped out Bill's area and researched how long natural gas would last in his setup. His original script was "quite a bit longer" than the final episode. Hoar's original version was around 77 minutes long; he cut it down to 72 but Mazin insisted they reinsert some elements, resulting in the final 75-minute runtime. Hoar felt a 59-minute episode would have failed. Deadline published Mazin's script in May 2023, considering it among the year's ten best drama episodes.

Mazin approached series co-creator Neil Druckmann, who wrote and co-directed the video game, with the idea of expanding Bill and Frank's story from the games; he felt Bill's inclusion in the game was built around gameplay whereas the television series would allow a deeper look at the character. Druckmann approved as he felt it improved the overall series narrative; he considered a positive relationship a smart inclusion as the series already featured several examples of dark outcomes. He found the game's version of events—wherein Bill saves Joel's life in the present and Frank is already dead—would have been too boring as a television episode without player agency, and likewise the show's story lacked the action sequences required for gameplay. Mazin enjoyed the ability to demonstrate the passage of time and the events within the first 20 years of the outbreak, which was not featured in the games. He considered the episode an opportunity to show that happiness and peace was still achievable; he wanted the episode to explore the dichotomy of loving someone—a recurring theme in the series—and how love manifests in the post-apocalypse.

The episode intentionally avoids specifying Frank's degenerative illness; Mazin said it was either multiple sclerosis or early ALS. One of Bill's lines—"This isn't the tragic suicide at the end of the play"—was inspired by Mart Crowley's play The Boys in the Band (1968); Mazin wanted to avoid the trope of equating homosexuality with tragedy. The final shot of the open window was a reference to the game's title screen. Mazin and Druckmann had envisioned each episode's HBO Max page opening on a unique window shot before the episode started, akin to a title screen, and the final shot was framed to match this; while the idea was later scrapped, the shot remained in the episode. Mazin felt it implied promise and loss, while signifying Bill and Frank were at peace with each other. Hoar felt the shot allowed one final moment with Bill and Frank. Murray Bartlett (who portrays Frank) considered it romantic and Nick Offerman (Bill) found it emotional; Mazin considered it a happy ending. Druckmann considered Bill's suicide note a reminder of Joel's failure at protecting his daughter Sarah and partner Tess in the two preceding episodes.

=== Casting and characters ===
Bartlett and Con O'Neill's casting as Frank and Bill was announced on July 15, 2021. Bartlett was unfamiliar with the source material but was drawn to the show after he read the script. He researched the game after receiving the role and found it cinematic, citing the characters, narrative, and themes. According to Mazin, the producers cried during Bartlett's audition. Druckmann expected some fans to be upset by Frank's inclusion in the show due to the divergence from the game's narrative. On December 5, Bartlett claimed Nick Offerman would appear on the show in a role close to his; two days later, Offerman was announced to be playing Bill, replacing O'Neill who was forced to drop out due to scheduling conflicts with Our Flag Means Death. Mazin wanted gay men to play Frank and Bill, but after O'Neill's departure, he was drawn to casting Offerman at the suggestion of executive producer Carolyn Strauss.

Mazin felt inspired to cast a comedic actor like Offerman because "funny people have soul", a mantra he learned from Vince Gilligan, citing performances like Bryan Cranston in Breaking Bad and Bob Odenkirk in Better Call Saul. A scheduling conflict originally prohibited Offerman from accepting the role but he decided to take it after his wife Megan Mullally read the script; he felt attached to the material and found a kinship with Bill due to his experience in crafting. Hoar, executive producer Evan Wells, and co-executive producer Jacqueline Lesko met Offerman and Bartlett and had dinner before production to better understand the characters. Offerman was cleanshaven with short hair when he began working on the show; the production team decided to add long hair and a beard to demonstrate Bill's inability to express himself. Bill's first line in the episode—"Not today you New World Order jack-booted fucks"—was originally written as a description but Offerman insisted on saying it aloud. Offerman selected some of the books and videos to place in Bill's entertainment area.

A singing coach helped Offerman and Bartlett prepare for the piano performances; Bartlett was specifically coached to sing worse. Offerman rehearsed the song with Mullally, a singer. Cinematographer Eben Bolter recalled seeing Offerman's hands shaking between takes of the performance. Mazin and Offerman—both heterosexual—sought advice and approval from gay men involved in the production, including Bartlett, Hoar, editor Timothy A. Good, and unit production manager Cecil O'Connor. Mazin ultimately considered their age more important than their sexuality as he wanted to explore a long, committed relationship; having been married for 27 years, he understood "there's a different kind of love" in long-term partnerships. Mazin felt Offerman's inexperience in playing gay men added to the role, as Bill is similarly inexperienced in exploring his sexuality. Offerman considered the role important as he hoped the representation helped to "break down [the] walls" of gender stereotypes. In the sex scene, Offerman found Bill's discomfort "easy to channel" due to the crew members watching on set.

=== Music ===
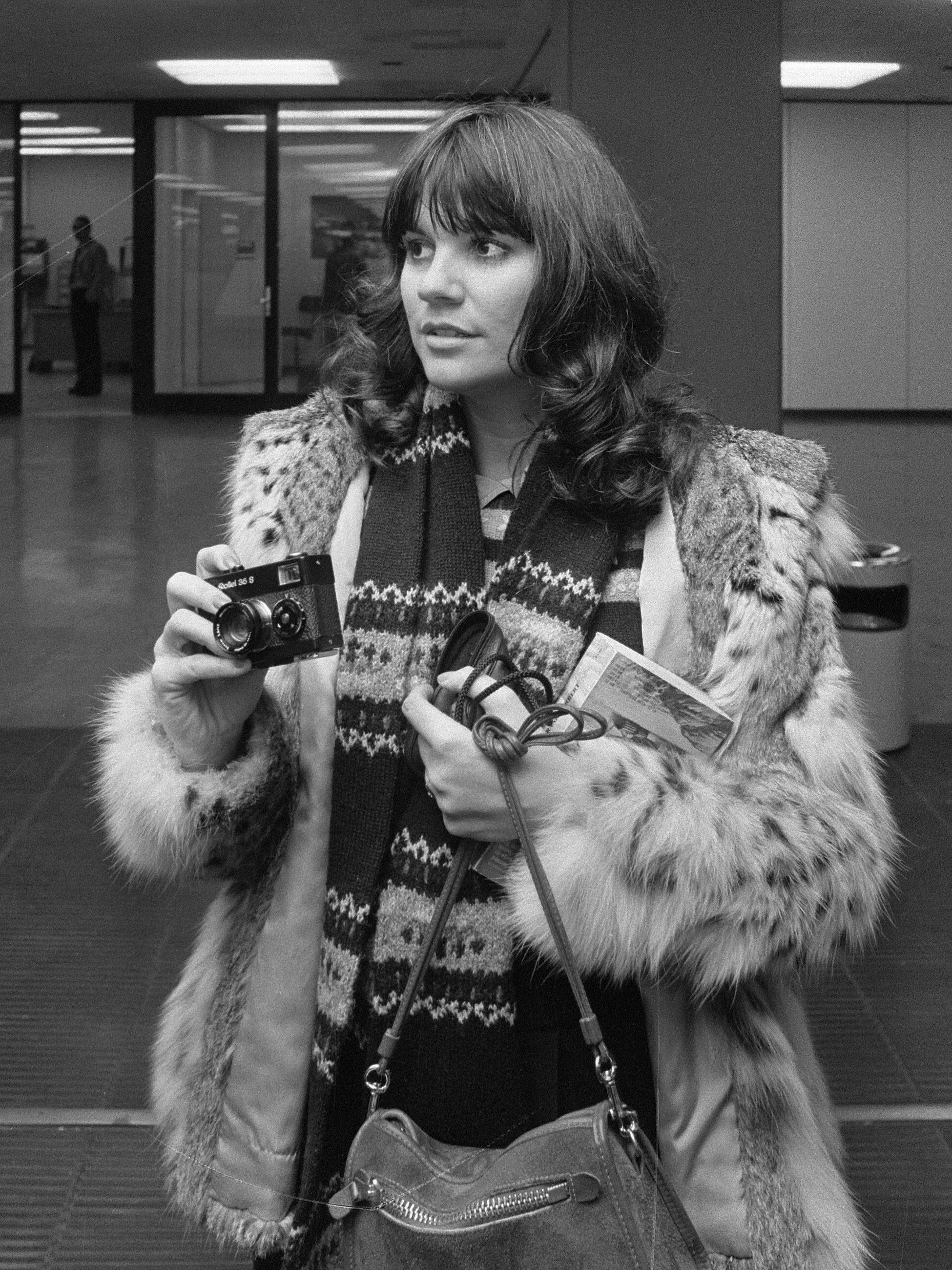
Linda Ronstadt's song "Long Long Time" is featured heavily in the episode as it represents unfulfilled and unacknowledged love.

Mazin wanted Bill and Frank to initially connect through a song about lonely heartache and "making your peace with the fact that you will always be alone". Struggling to find a song, he spoke to his friend Seth Rudetsky in February 2021, requesting a show tune like "I Miss the Music" from the musical Curtains (2006). Rudetsky suggested "Her Face" from Carnival! (1961), which Mazin felt was "perfect". After discovering the scenario involved a closeted man singing to an openly gay man, Rudetsky suggested Linda Ronstadt's "Long Long Time", written by Gary White; he felt the lyrics represented the lack of acknowledgement from one's love. Rudetsky received a consultancy credit for the episode. The song exhibits themes of unfulfilled love and how time heals wounds. The moment with Frank at the piano marks the beginning of profound change for Bill, who finds himself in an unexpected long-term, loving relationship that eventually sees him care for another individual. Bill and Frank's relationship is echoed in the lyrics:

Love will abide, take things in stride
Sounds like good advice, but there's no one at my side
And time washes clean, love's wounds unseen
That's what someone told me, but I don't know what it means.

In the hour after the episode's broadcast, Ronstadt's song saw a 4,900% increase in streams on Spotify in the United States over the previous week; outlets compared it to the 2022 resurgence of Kate Bush's "Running Up That Hill" after its use in the fourth season of Stranger Things. According to Luminate, from January 28 to 30, daily streams of the song in the United States increased from under 8,000 to almost 149,000—a spike of 1,776%—and daily sales jumped to over 1,500, a 13,782% increase. For the first time, (Note: "Long Long Time" previously peaked at 25 on the Billboard Hot 100 in October 1970.) the song topped three Billboard charts in the week preceding February 11: Rock Digital Song Sales from 6,000 downloads (an 11,181% increase) in the United States; LyricFind U.S., from a 3,013% increase in lyric search and usage; and LyricFind Global, a 2,047% increase. It ranked sixth on the Hot Trending Songs chart, and fifth on January's Top TV Songs chart. Ronstadt, who sold rights to her music in 2021, said "I still love the song and I'm very glad that Gary will get a windfall".

Montages in the episode use "I'm Coming Home to Stay" by Fleetwood Mac and "White Room" by Cream. Bill and Frank's final scene features an instrumental piece by Max Richter, "On the Nature of Daylight". Hoar had tried to use the piece in It's a Sin (2021) but it was removed. He used it as temp music for the episode and HBO approved the licensing; Bolter had assumed it would be replaced during editing, particularly due to the licensing fee, but was "so moved and delighted" by its inclusion. Richter responded by performing the piece on piano in a TikTok video, which he dedicated to Bill and Frank. "On the Nature of Daylight" ranked tenth on Billboard's Top TV Songs chart for January.

=== Filming ===
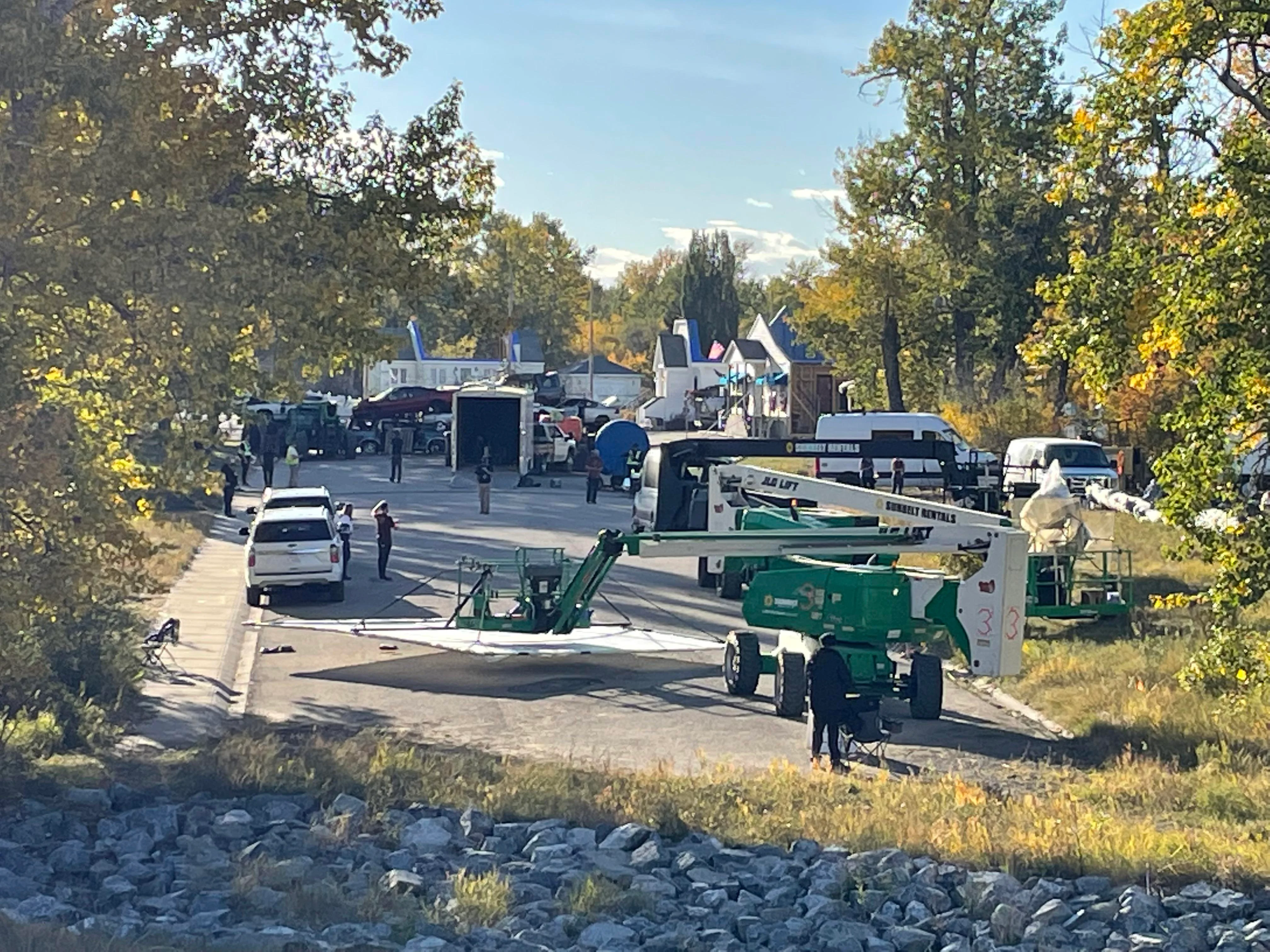
Bill's town of Lincoln, Massachusetts, was recreated in the former Beachwood area of High River, Alberta.

"Long, Long Time" was filmed in September 2021; preparation and filming took around 20 days each. Some larger sequences were filmed roughly in order. Eben Bolter worked as cinematographer. The opening scene of Joel at the river was filmed in Banff, Alberta; the production team discussed digitally removing mountains in the background to better resemble Greater Boston's topography but they were ultimately included. Bolter wanted the opening shots to resemble an "early morning feeling when the sun's just about to come up". The following scenes with Joel and Ellie was filmed at Sheep River Falls; Bolter had large lights in place in case clouds covered the sun. The walking sequences were filmed in the Ann & Sandy Cross Conservation Area, at a stone bridge in Fish Creek Park, and the Priddis General Store near Alberta Highway 22. Some of Bill's early montage scenes were filmed at a gas plant in Mazeppa, and the closed Lowe's Home Improvement store in Shawnessy, representing The Home Depot.

Bill's town of Lincoln was recreated in the former Beachwood area of High River, which was abandoned following the 2013 Alberta floods. On July 12, the High River town council approved the production team's request to film in Beachwood between July 12 and October 31; in exchange, the production paid CA$100,000 to the town of High River for community funding, which was ultimately split between the High River Bike Park Society (80%) and Spitzee School (20%). The production team removed three trees in the area, for which they reimbursed the town an additional CA$15,000. Production designer John Paino and his team constructed the town of Lincoln in around six to twelve weeks; greenery was transported from Vancouver to replicate Lincoln's foliage, which was expanded to demonstrate the passage of time. The buildings lacked roofs, requiring the visual effects department to add them into every shot. The scene at the strawberry patch was filmed in the last moments of available light during the day; Hoar considered it among his favorite moments "because it's so natural and so real". The piano scene was filmed with three cameras—separate cameras for Offerman and Bartlett, and a roving camera to move between them—as Mazin wanted it recorded as a live performance.

Most interiors were built on a soundstage, including Bill's house and bunker. The front room of Bill's house existed both on a soundstage and on location; the latter version was used to allow the camera to move from inside to outside during an action sequence. Hoar used minimal lighting for the action scene, limited to fire and occasional lightning. Mazin assisted in directing the scene, filming additional close-ups. Paino felt Bill's family were likely among the "first settlers" of the town, demonstrated by their house's central placement, and therefore it contained old artifacts. Bolter, a fan of the games, pitched the final shot of the window to Mazin as a tribute to the first game's title screen; the corner of the bedroom interior was constructed on a platform to allow the crane shot to move from outside to inside. He said they "had to fight for that shot". The last scene filmed was Bill and Frank in their bedroom on their final day. Principal photography concluded on October 5, 2021.

== Reception ==
=== Broadcast and ratings ===
The episode aired on HBO on January 29, 2023. Annie Wersching, who portrayed Tess in the video game, died on the same day; the episode was altered several days later to add a dedication. The episode had 6.4 million viewers in the United States on its first night, including linear viewers and streams on HBO Max—an increase of 12% from the previous week and 37% from the premiere. On linear television, it had 747,000 viewers on its first night, with a 0.21 ratings share.

=== Critical response ===
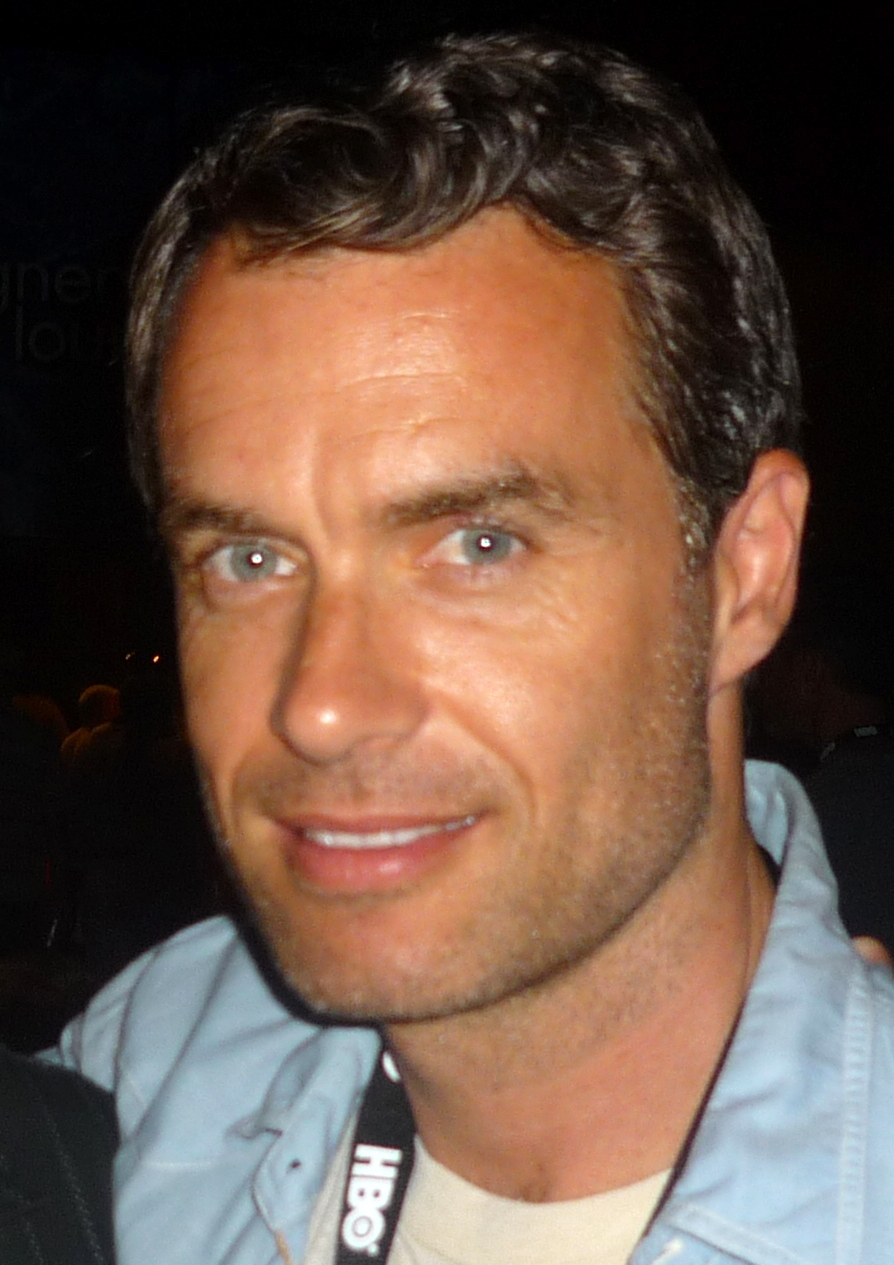
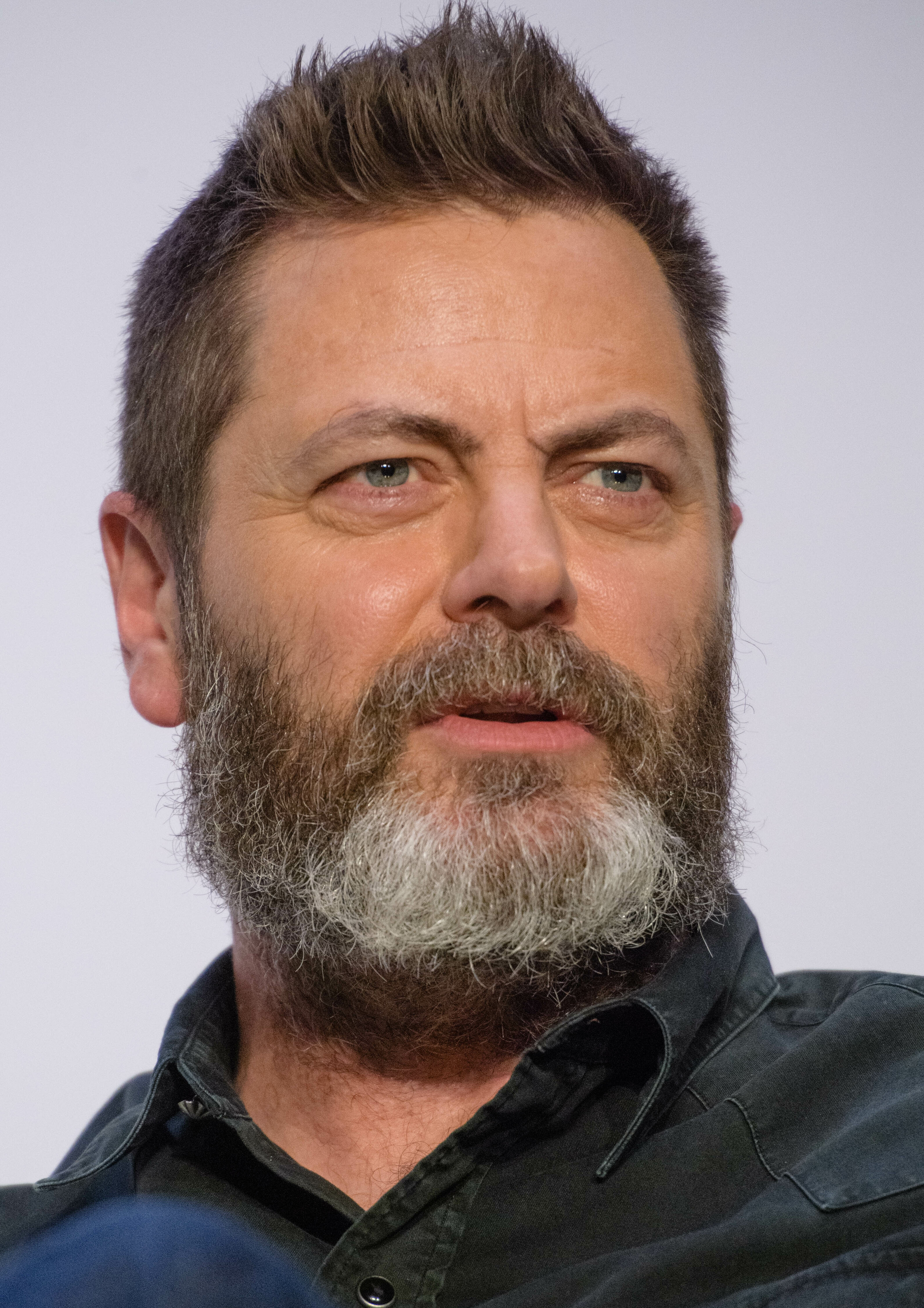
The performances of Murray Bartlett (left) and Nick Offerman (right) were widely praised by critics; both were nominated for Outstanding Guest Actor at the 75th Primetime Creative Arts Emmy Awards, with Offerman winning.

"Long, Long Time" has a Rotten Tomatoes approval rating of 98% based on 50 reviews, with an average rating of 9.9/10. The website's critical consensus said the episode "richly deepens" the show's story, "beautifully played" by Offerman and Bartlett. Critics overwhelmingly considered the episode the season's best, and some named it among the greatest television episodes in recent years and of all time; Rolling Stone's Chris Cruz calling it "a rare glimpse of an apocalypse that's more than just misery porn". The Hollywood Reporter's Daniel Fienberg felt it elevated the series to a new level. Empire's John Nugent named it "one of the finest hours of television in recent memory", and The Guardian's Andy Welch called it "absolutely magical television". CNN's Brian Lowry wrote the final shot "represented the perfect close to an almost-perfect hour of television". Some critics compared Bill and Frank's story to Up's (2009) opening sequence for its ability to tell a heartwarming and heartbreaking story in a limited time.

Offerman and Bartlett's performances were highly praised; Complex's William Goodman described them as a "career-best" and TV Guide's Kat Moon considered them deserving of Emmy nominations but felt Offerman's performance "demands special attention". Regarding the recasting of Bill, The Guardian's Welch wrote "it's now hard to imagine anyone other than Offerman in that role". Reviewers lauded Offerman's ability to portray Bill's gentler side, and Bartlett's eager and charismatic attitude as Frank; TVLine named them the Performers of the Week. Den of Geek's Bernard Boo wrote their "performance as a pair is pitch-perfect", and Vulture's Keith Phipps praised their ability to convey emotions without dialogue. Conversely, Vulture's Jackson McHenry found Offerman and Bartlett were "stuck in wooden roles acting out maudlin dynamics". Pedro Pascal and Bella Ramsey's performances as Joel and Ellie were well received.

The A.V. Club's David Cote praised Mazin's writing for its humor and heart without overt cheesiness. Push Square's Aaron Bayne applauded the decision to tell a different story from the game; Mashable's Belen Edwards felt the episode's beauty would have been impossible otherwise. Slate's Victoria Ritvo lauded the connection to the larger story while remaining largely self-contained. IGN's Simon Cardy called Bill and Frank's final day "remarkably touching from start to finish"; Den of Geek's Boo said it was "overwhelming to watch", an impressive feat considering the limited time with the characters. Evening Standard's Vicky Jessop felt, while beautiful and moving, the episode lacked explanation for viewers unfamiliar with the video game. Vulture's McHenry wrote it "tries so hard to imitate what we think of prestige television that it forgets to say anything at all". IndieWire's Steve Greene praised Hoar's physical direction and Paino's production design, and Total Film's Bradley Russell lauded Hoar's ability to elevate small moments into significance, citing the strawberry patch scene. After the episode, film director Steven Spielberg sent an email to Mazin, who shared it with Hoar, Offerman, Bartlett, and Bolter.

Radio Times's Adam Starkey felt the depiction of a mature gay relationship set a benchmark for the medium; Slate's J. Bryan Lowder recognized the importance of presenting a gay couple as role models amidst growing anti-LGBT sentiment that "gender ideology" and sexual deviance is being used to recruit children. Kotaku's Kenneth Shepard appreciated the relationship's ties to pre-apocalypse LGBTQ+ history that, as other characters and relationships in the franchise illustrate, were no longer common knowledge. The Washington Post's Riley MacLeod thought it suffered from tropes like Frank's illness and the couple's isolation, though acknowledged these were partly due to the apocalypse rather than their sexuality. The episode was the subject of review bombing on IMDb and Metacritic, which journalists largely attributed to homophobia.

=== Accolades ===
At the 75th Primetime Emmy Awards, Offerman won Outstanding Guest Actor in a Drama Series, for which Bartlett was also nominated. Offerman won Best Guest Actor in a Drama Series at the 1st Astra Creative Arts TV Awards and Best Supporting Performance in a New Scripted Series at the 39th Independent Spirit Awards; Bartlett was nominated for both. Offerman was nominated for Best Guest Starring Role on Television at the 51st Saturn Awards, and Bartlett for Supporting Role in a Series at the 28th Satellite Awards. Offerman's piano performance was nominated for Best TV Musical Performance at the Dorian Awards, and for Best Musical Moment at the 2023 MTV Movie & TV Awards.

At the Emmy Awards, the episode was nominated for Contemporary Makeup (Non-Prosthetic) (Note: Nominees: department head makeup artist Connie Parker; and key makeup artist Joanna Mireau) and Contemporary Hairstyling, (Note: Nominees: department head hairstylist Chris Glimsdale; key hairstylist Penny Thompson; and Pascal's personal hairstylist Courtney Ullrich) and Mazin, Hoar, and Gustavo Santaolalla for Outstanding Writing, Outstanding Directing, and Outstanding Music Composition, respectively. Mazin won the Humanitas Prize for Drama Teleplay, Hoar won Outstanding Directing at the 76th Directors Guild of America Awards, and Good won Best Edited Drama Series at the American Cinema Editors Awards 2024, while Michael J. Benavente and Joe Schiff were nominated for Outstanding Achievement in Sound Editing at the Golden Reel Awards 2023 and Mazin for Best Adapted Screenplay – Television at the USC Scripter Awards. The episode won Best Dramatic Presentation, Short Form at the 2024 Hugo Awards.
