= Lamar Johnson (actor) =

Canadian actor and dancer

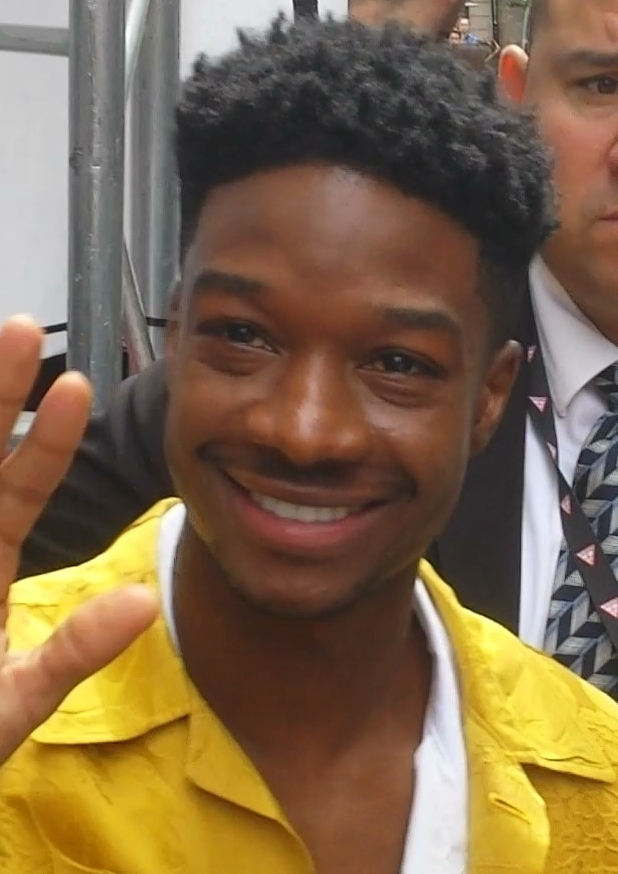
- Johnson in 2018
- Born: Toronto, Ontario, Canada
- Occupations: Actor, dancer
- Years active: 2006–present

Lamar Johnson is a Canadian actor and dancer. He is known for his roles as West in the dance drama The Next Step (2013–2019), as Seven Carter in the American drama film The Hate U Give (2018), as Charlie in All the Bright Places (2020), and as Henry Burrell in The Last of Us (2023).

He won the Canadian Screen Award for Best Lead Performance in a Film at the 11th Canadian Screen Awards in 2023, for his performance as Michael in the film Brother.

== Biography ==
Johnson was born in Toronto, Ontario. He is a skilled dancer and is self-taught, although he was later trained at the Canadian Dance Company. He attended school at St. Mother Teresa Catholic Academy. Johnson rose to fame in the hit show The Next Step as hip hop dancer West, after several bit-parts and minor appearances. He also danced with Seeds on the street, gaining experience dancing in a troupe.

For his role in The Last of Us as Henry Burrell, Johnson received a nomination for the Primetime Emmy Award for Outstanding Guest Actor in a Drama Series.

In 2024 he was named as co-winner, alongside Devery Jacobs, of the Radius Award at the 12th Canadian Screen Awards.

== Filmography ==
=== Film ===
Year	Title	Role	Notes
2012	Home Again	Young Dunston	
2016	Full Out	Twist	
2017	Kings	Jesse Cooper	
2017	Filth City	Smush	
2018	The Hate U Give	Seven Carter	
2019	Native Son	Gus	
2019	Dark Phoenix	Match	
2020	Run Sweetheart Run	Norlon	
2020	All the Bright Places	Charlie	
2022	Brother	Michael	
2023	Manodrome	Garfield	
2025	The Wilderness	Miles	

=== Television ===
Year	Title	Role	Notes
2011	Covert Affairs	Kid #1	Episode: "Begin the Begin"
2012	Degrassi: The Next Generation	Niner	Episode: "In the Cold, Cold Night: Part 1"
2012	The Firm	Donnell Heywood	Episode: "Pilot"
2012	Rookie Blue	Tyler Markes	Episode: "A Good Shoot"
2013–2019	The Next Step	West	118 episodes
2014	Saving Hope	Harry	Episode: "Remains of the Day"
2017	Mary Kills People	Ethan Grant	Episode: "Morning Glory"
2020–2021	Your Honor	Kofi Jones	5 episodes
2023	The Last of Us	Henry Burrell	2 episodes
2025	The Abandons	Albert Mason	Main role

== Awards and nominations ==
Award	Year	Category	Work	Result
Canadian Screen Award	2023	Best Lead Performance in a Film	Brother	Won
Primetime Emmy Awards	2023	Outstanding Guest Actor in a Drama Series	The Last of Us	Nominated
Satellite Awards	2023	Best Supporting Actor – Series, Miniseries or Television Film	The Last of Us	Nominated
