= Sara Nasserzadeh =

Social psychologist and author

- سارا ناصرزاده
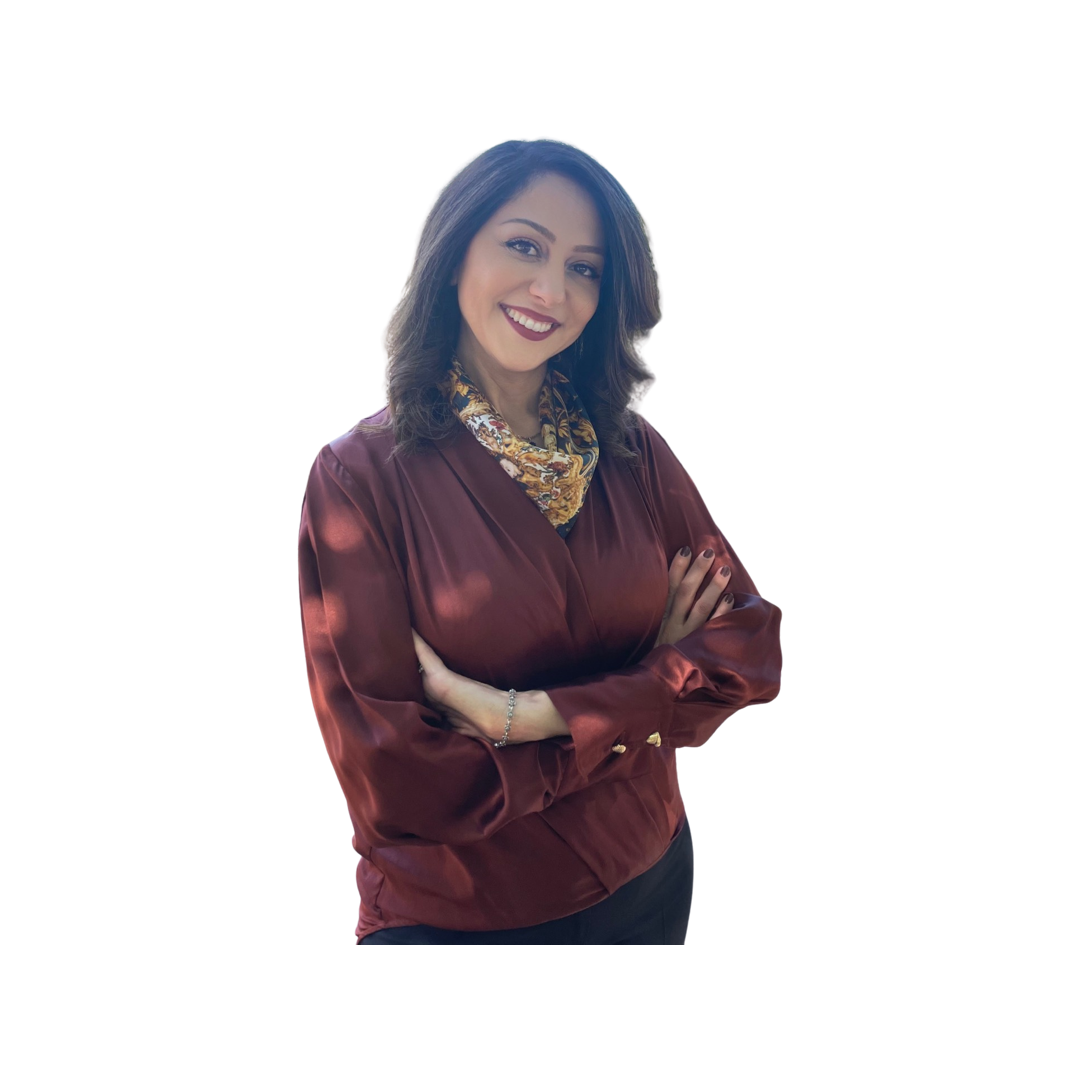
- Education: Middlesex University (PhD); Relate Institute; Palo Alto University
- Spouse: Pejman Azarmina
- Awards: AASECT Professional Standard of Excellence Award (2021), AASECT Book Award (2010), British Council Nomination for Social Impact Award (2017), BBC World Service Award for Innovation of the Year (2007), Vincent Clark Award
- Scientific career
- Fields: Social psychology, sexuality and relational science
- Institutions: Relationship Panoramic, Inc.
- Thesis: Understanding the sexual health information needs and preferences of “hard to reach” young people (2010)
- Doctoral advisor: Betsy Thom; Daniel Kelly
- Website: www.sara-nasserzadeh.com

Sara Nasserzadeh is a social psychologist, public speaker and author. She is known mostly for her educational programs on BBC World Service and Persian TV on human sexuality and relationships. She received the BBC’s Innovation of the Year Award in 2007 and was among the BBC Persian 100 Influential Women. Nasserzadeh received the People of Distinction Humanitarian Award in New York City in 2014. She is also a winner of AASECT Book Award and AASECT Professional Standard of Excellence Award. She won the Vincent Clark award for her book Love by Design, by the California Association of Marriage and Family Therapists (CAMFT).

== Education ==
Sara Nasserzadeh completed her undergraduate degree in linguistics and continued her graduate studies in London at Middlesex University, Relate Institute, Sheffield Hallam University and University of East London. In England, she obtained a master’s degree in social sciences research methodologies, a PhD in social psychology, a graduate certificate in couple counseling and a postgraduate diploma in psychosexual therapy. In the US, she also obtained a master’s degree in marriage and family therapy from Palo Alto University in California.

== Career ==
Nasserzadeh is a UK-trained social psychologist and psychosexual therapist who started her career with a focus on psychosexual dysfunctions and comprehensive sexuality education for marginalized groups. Between 2006 and 2008, BBC World Service commissioned her to produce three seasons of a radio show called the Whispers providing sex education for Persian-speaking audiences across Iran, Afghanistan and those living in diaspora. The show won a prestigious award by the BBC World Service in 2007 and was further commissioned by BBC Persian TV and aired from 2015 to 2019.

Nasserzadeh is also Senior Accredited member and a Registered Supervisor at the College of Sexual and Relationship Therapists in the UK (COSRT). She has collaborated with UN agencies (primarily with UNFPA), non-profit organizations, Pfizer, Stanford and professional organizations such as the American Association for Sexuality Educators, Counselors and Therapists (AASECT) and the World Association for Sexual Health (WAS).

As a public speaker and subject matter expert, Nasserzadeh has delivered hundreds of training workshop, plenary sessions, keynotes and lectures to thousands of mental health and healthcare professionals, educators, researchers, government officials and members of public on a wide range of topics such as emergent love, cultural humility and genital practices around the globe, to name a few. Nasserzadeh has developed the theoretical framework around the concept of "emergent love" as an anti-dote for love confusion at a time that current models of love seem to be inadequate or failing. One of her ideas is the introduction of sexual harmony as an alternative to basing relationships on sexual chemistry.

Nasserzadeh has been engaged in various leadership roles of a few professional association. In 2009, she created and continuously chaired the Middle East Sexual Health Committee of the World Association for Sexual Health (WAS) and held other offices such as Acting Vice President, Associate Secretary for North America, and member of the International Scientific Committee. At AASECT, Nasserzadeh chaired the Awards Committee, the Communications Steering Committee, and the International Outreach Committee for various terms. She is currently the chair of the board of Diversity and Social Justice at California Psychological Association.

In 2013, Nasserzadeh started the World Sexual Health Day events (North America chapter) in New York, which was later transferred to Stanford University. In 2019, she co-founded a California Benefit Corporation called Relationship Panoramic and co-created and scientifically validated an inventory to holistically assess dyadic relationships. She is currently based in West Los Angeles and works/travels globally.

== Selected publications ==
- Love by Design: 6 Ingredients to Build a Lifetime of Love, Balance, 2024 ISBN 978-0-00-861302-0
- The Orgasm Answer Guide, with Beverly Whipple, Barry R. Komisaruk, and Carlos Beyer-Flores, Johns Hopkins University Press 2009, ISBN 978-0-8018-9396-4
- Nasserzadeh, S., Azarmina, P. (2017). Sexuality Education Wheel of Context: A Guide for Sexuality Educators, Advocates and Researchers. CreateSpace.
- Nasserzadeh, S. (2021). Revitalization of Diversity and Social Justice within CPA, The California Psychologist. 54(4): 7.
- Nasserzadeh, S. (2020). Diversity and Inclusion from bedroom to the boardroom. The California Psychologist. 53(2), 14-17.
- Nasserzadeh, S. (2018). Psychological Management of Orgasm Disorders. In I. Goldstein et al. (Eds.) Textbook of Female Sexual Function and Dysfunction, Wiley. doi:10.1002/9781119266136.ch14
- Usigli, A. C., Braeken, D., Kismödi, E., Nasserzadeh, S., Pericas, C., & Dee, H. (2017). SY-13 Sexual pleasure: from a comprehensive definition to practical implementation. The Journal of Sexual Medicine, 14(5), e228.
- Nasserzadeh, S., & Ribner, D. S. (2016). Guest Editorial: The Challenge of Culture. Sexual and Relationship Therapy, 31 (3), 257-258.
- Nasserzadeh, S. (2015). Ethnic and cultural aspects of sexuality. In K.R. Wylie (Ed.) ABC of Sexual Health (3rd Edition), Wiley. ISBN 978-1-118-66569-5
- Nasserzadeh, S., et al. (2014) Health and Social Care Promotion Materials That Focus on Intimacy and Sexuality in the Third Age, IntimAge Guidelines.
- Nasserzadeh, S. (2010). Understanding the sexual health information needs and preferences of “hard to reach” young people (Doctoral dissertation, Middlesex University)
- Nasserzadeh S (2009). Sexuality education in Iran: personal reflections and professional experiences, in E. Schroeder and J. Kuriansky (eds.) Sexuality Education: Past Present and Future. Westport, Connecticut: Praeger. ISBN 978-0275997946
- Nasserzadeh S. “Sex therapy”: a marginalized specialization. Arch Sex Behav. 2009 Dec;38(6):1037-8. DOI: 10.1007/s10508-009-9537-z. PMID 19705269.
- Nasserzadeh, S. (2007). Challenges of Muslim immigrants: a psychosexual perspective. Psychotherapy in Australia, 14(1), 65.
- Ohlrichs Y., Nasserzadeh S., and Doherty M. (2007) The International Platform of Sexuality & Relationship Education, Sex Education, 7:3, 331-332, DOI: 10.1080/14681810701448135
- Hoggart, L., Nasserzadeh, S., & Shamash, M. (2006). Young women, sex and choices: a study of young motherhood in Haringey.
