= Future Days =

Future Days may refer to:

- Future Days (album), 1973 album by Can
- "Future Days" (Pearl Jam song), 2013
- "Future Days" (The Last of Us), 2025 television episode
