= The Orgasm Answer Guide =

2009 book

- Author: Beverly Whipple, Barry R. Komisaruk, Sara Nasserzadeh, Carlos Beyer-Flore
- Language: English
- Subject: orgasm
- Publisher: Johns Hopkins University Press
- Publication date: 2009
- Media type: Print
- Pages: 176
- ISBN: 978-0-8018-9396-4

The Orgasm Answer Guide is a 2009 book by Beverly Whipple, Barry R. Komisaruk, Sara Nasserzadeh and Carlos Beyer-Flores in which the authors pose 84 questions and answers pertaining to orgasm and other aspects of human sexuality. The book is a winner of 2010 AASECT Book Award. It is a more accessible version of the book The Science of Orgasm (2006).

== Reception ==
Susan Quilliam calls this book "thoroughly" recommended and believes that it "brings together in a single work all human knowledge about orgasms."
