= The G Spot and Other Recent Discoveries About Human Sexuality =

1982 book by Alice Kahn Ladas, Beverly Whipple, and John D. Perry

- Author: Alice Kahn Ladas, Beverly Whipple, and John D. Perry
- Publication date: 1982

The G Spot and Other Recent Discoveries About Human Sexuality is a book by Alice Kahn Ladas, Beverly Whipple, and John D. Perry that argues for the existence of the Gräfenberg Spot and popularized the term G-Spot. It was published in 1982 and became an international bestseller, appearing on The New York Times bestseller list, and was translated into 19 languages. The book was published by Holt, Rinehart, and Winston and was, at the suggestion of Ladas, a popular account of three academic papers published by the authors the previous year.

The book contains information on enhancement of sexual function, including by stimulation of the male prostate. It discusses female ejaculation and brought the issue back into discussions of women's sexuality both in the medical community and among the general public. Ladas, Beverly Whipple, and John Perry argue that male and female sexuality were almost identical, and suggested that men, like women, can experience multiple orgasms. The book advances the feminist theory that because women's pleasure in their sexuality has been historically excluded, the pleasure of ejaculation has been either discounted or appropriated by health professionals as a physiological phenomenon.

Author and sex educator Rebecca Chalker states that this book was largely met with scorn, skepticism and disbelief. The chapter on "Female Ejaculation" is largely based on anecdotal testimony, and illustrates another issue in the debate, the weight placed on anecdotes and small numbers of observations rather than biomedical investigation or clinical trials. Importantly, a number of the women stated that they had been diagnosed with urinary incontinence.

== In popular culture ==
In Ali Abbasi's 2024 film The Apprentice, Ivana Trump is depicted gifting the book to her then husband Donald Trump.
