= Barry Komisaruk =

American psychologist (born 1941)

- Born: 1941 (age 84–85)
- Education: Rutgers University (PhD), City University of New York (BA)
- Scientific career
- Fields: psychology
- Institutions: Rutgers University
- Thesis: Localization in brain of reproductive behavior responses to progesterone in ring doves (1966)
- Doctoral advisor: Daniel S. Lehrman
- Other academic advisors: Charles H. Sawyer

Barry R. Komisaruk (born 1941) is an American psychologist and Distinguished Professor of Psychology at Rutgers University. He is known for his works on sexology and sex therapy.

== Books ==
- The Orgasm Answer Guide (2009) with Beverly Whipple, Sara Nasserzadeh and Carlos Beyer-Flores
- The Science of Orgasm (2006) with Beverly Whipple and Carlos Beyer-Flores
