= When We Are in Need =

- The Last of Us episode
- Ellie (Bella Ramsey) is traumatized after killing David. Ramsey considered the moment a turning point for Ellie. Critics praised their performance and the cinematography.
- Episode no.: Season 1 Episode 8
- Directed by: Ali Abbasi
- Written by: Craig Mazin
- Cinematography by: Nadim Carlsen
- Editing by: Cindy Mollo
- Original air date: March 5, 2023
- Running time: 51 minutes

Guest appearances
- Scott Shepherd as David; Troy Baker as James

Episode chronology
← Previous "Left Behind"	Next → "Look for the Light"
- The Last of Us season 1

"When We Are in Need" is the eighth episode of the first season of the American post-apocalyptic drama television series The Last of Us. Written by series co-creator Craig Mazin and directed by Ali Abbasi, it aired on HBO on March 5, 2023. In the episode, Ellie (Bella Ramsey) attempts to protect Joel (Pedro Pascal). She encounters a group of survivors led by a preacher, David (Scott Shepherd), who wants vengeance against Joel and shows interest in Ellie.

The episode was filmed in February 2022 in Alberta. Troy Baker, who portrayed Joel in the video games on which the series is based, guest starred as James; co-creators Mazin and Neil Druckmann considered his inclusion important due to his proximity to the games. The episode received positive reviews, with praise for its direction, cinematography, and performances of Ramsey and Shepherd, though some critics found its pacing rushed. It was watched by 8.1 million viewers on its first day. Ramsey submitted the episode to support their nomination for Lead Actress in a Drama Series at the 75th Primetime Emmy Awards.

== Plot ==
After discovering Joel's wound is infected, Ellie ventures out to find food. After shooting and killing a deer, she encounters David and James. She makes a deal to trade half of the deer for penicillin, which James returns to camp to obtain. Meanwhile, David, a preacher, explains he was a teacher of children the same age as Ellie, and he found God after the outbreak. He is now the leader of his group of survivors. He reveals the man Joel killed in Colorado (Note: As depicted in "Kin") was a member of his group. Ellie runs away after James gives her the penicillin under David's orders.

Ellie returns to Joel and injects him with penicillin. The following day, she spots David and James with a group of men seeking vengeance against Joel. She gives Joel a knife and warns him of the danger before fleeing on horseback to draw them away from Joel, but is captured after James shoots and kills her horse. David places her in a cage at his camp. After Ellie notices a human ear on the floor, David admits he has been feeding his group the flesh of their deceased. He tells her he admires her strengths and the violence in her heart. He caresses her hand through the bars of the cage, and tries to convince Ellie they should begin a relationship, but she breaks his finger in an unsuccessful attempt to steal his keys. Meanwhile, Joel awakens and kills one of David's men, then tortures and kills two more to discover Ellie's whereabouts.

Ellie bites David as he and James prepare to butcher her. Before they can kill her, she tells them she is infected, as proven by her bite mark. While they argue about whether this is a trick, Ellie kills James with the meat cleaver and escapes. As David hunts her, she sets fire to the steakhouse. She stabs him with a kitchen knife, but he overpowers and attempts to rape her. Ellie grabs David's fallen meat cleaver and kills him in a frenzied attack. A traumatized Ellie wanders outside. She panics as Joel embraces her, not immediately recognizing him. Joel comforts Ellie and they walk away.

== Production ==
=== Conception and writing ===
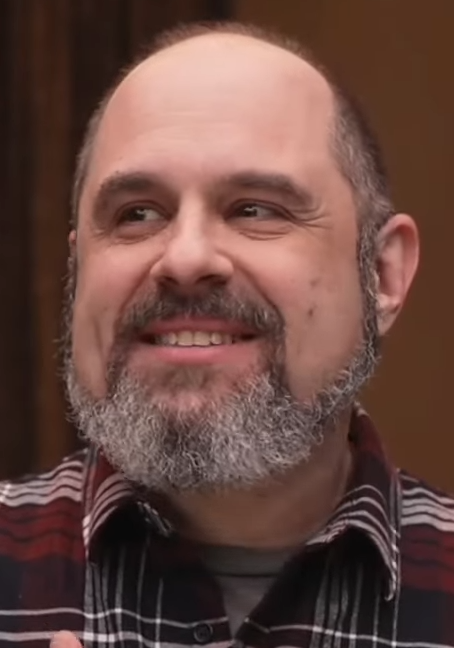
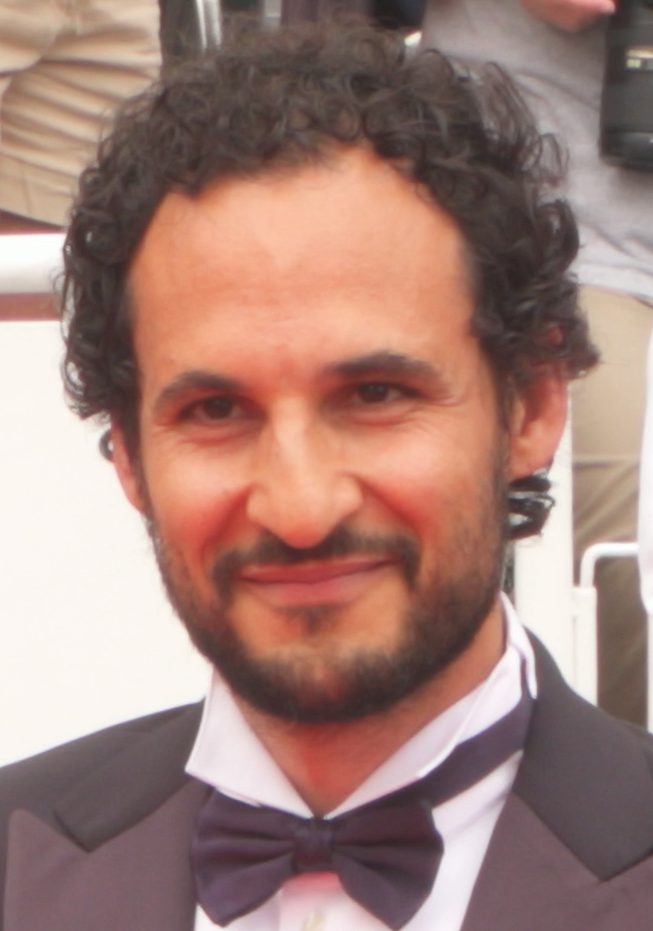
"When We Are in Need" was written by series co-creator Craig Mazin (left) and directed by Ali Abbasi (right).

"When We Are in Need" was written by The Last of Us series co-creator Craig Mazin and directed by Ali Abbasi. Abbasi was announced as one of the show's directors in April 2021. Mazin chose to open the episode with David reading Revelation 21 as it relates to the new world exceeding the old one, and dealing with grief and tragedy. The scene in which David and James attempt to kill Ellie was written similarly to the game as Mazin found it "so visceral".

The decision to move Joel and Ellie reuniting outside the restaurant (as opposed to inside, as in the game) was partly logical—the fire and lock would have prevented Joel from entering—and partly to demonstrate Ellie's ability to physically save herself before Joel saves her emotionally. Series co-creator Neil Druckmann, who wrote and co-directed the video game on which the series is based, felt the effectiveness of the series—like the game—hinged on the viewer feeling the emotion between Joel and Ellie in the conclusion; he considered it effective, as he cried heavily while watching the episode.

=== Casting and characters ===
Bella Ramsey, who portrays Ellie, found production on the episode "exhausting" but among their favorite on set. They held a real rifle in the episode and struggled with its weight; some of these moments were included in the episode to reflect Ellie's struggle. Ramsey felt Ellie was attempting to imitate Joel in those scenes, particularly in her handling of the gun and attempts to sound tough. For the scene in which Ellie kills David, Ramsey said that Ellie "learns that she really has this capacity for violence", which she finally expresses; they thought Ellie "scares herself because it felt good". Ramsey considered it a turning point for Ellie, and felt the character would have post-traumatic stress disorder as a result of her experience.

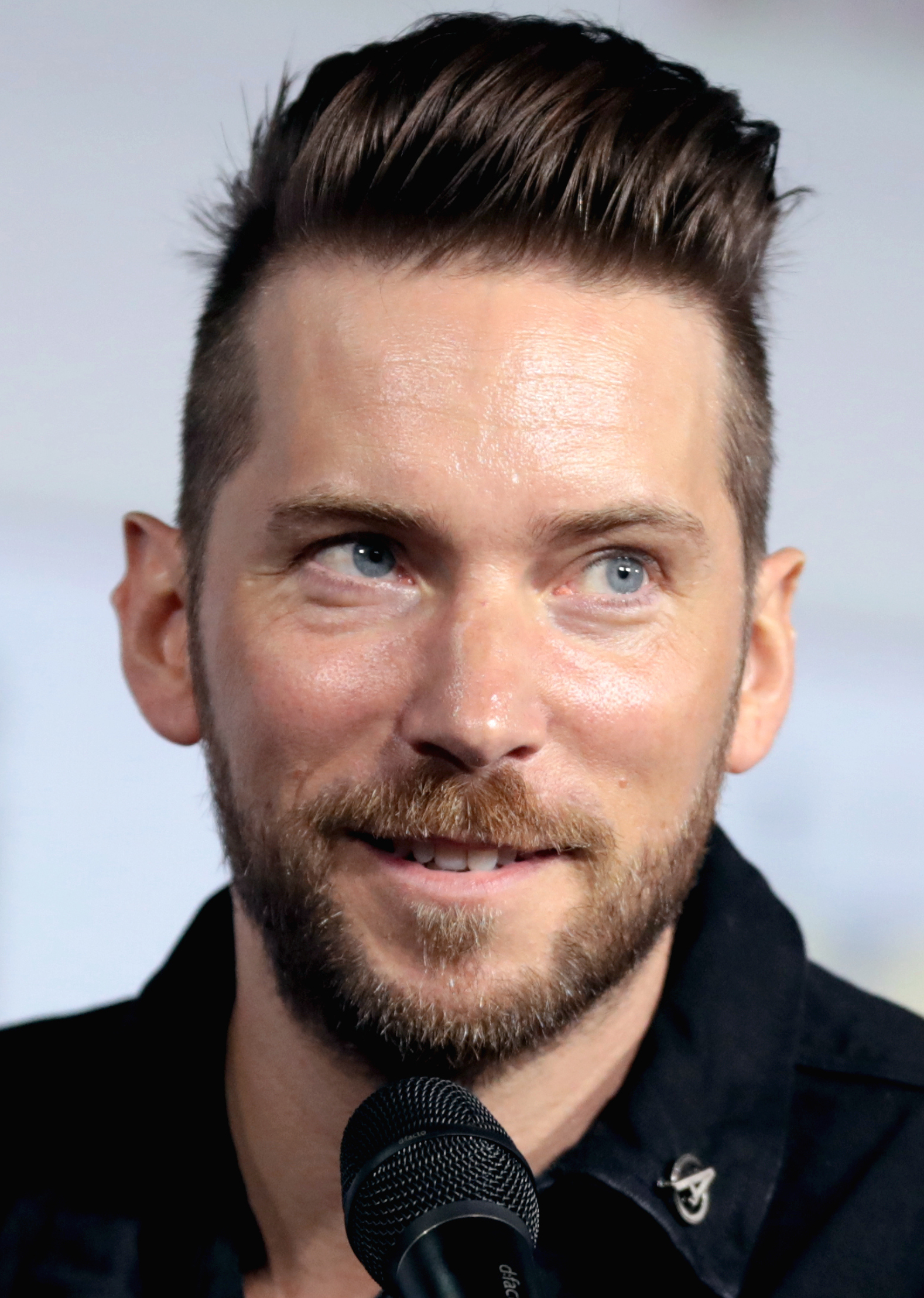
Troy Baker, who played James in "When We Are in Need", portrayed Joel in the video games.

In June 2022, Druckmann announced Troy Baker—who portrayed Joel in the video games—would feature in the series; his character name was revealed in December. Mazin and Druckmann considered Baker's inclusion in the series important due to his proximity to the games; meanwhile, Baker never assumed he would be involved in the series, except perhaps as a cameo appearance like a clicker. Upon being approached by Mazin and Druckmann, Baker did not initially remember James from the games; he was surprised by the character's significance upon reading the script.

Baker did not want to portray James as a villain but as someone with truth and empathy, reflected in his inability to shoot Ellie when prompted. He considered James a pragmatist who believes "David is the Devil" and, as a result, wants to remain on his good side; when Ellie's capabilities threaten to usurp James's position alongside David, he becomes defensive. Abbasi directed Baker to pray in the opening scene, but Baker suggested otherwise, noting James "thinks it's all bullshit". He felt James was likely preparing to enter law enforcement when the outbreak occurred, supporting his experience with weaponry and demonstrations of morality.

Prior to the announcement of Scott Shepherd's casting as David, rumors suggested Baker would play the character, but he felt it "would've been too on the nose". Shepherd's casting was revealed in the first trailer in December 2022. Druckmann felt the series allowed a deeper look into the character's complexities than the game; he and Mazin wanted to humanize David in his initial interactions with Ellie, before revealing more of his true actions when he slaps a young girl. Druckmann found David's goal of producing offspring through violence representative of some organized religions, and Mazin noted his goal to "secure a future" reflective of the ideologies of white supremacists.

=== Filming ===
Nadim Carlsen worked as cinematographer for the episode. Production took place in Okotoks, Alberta, in early 2022, with preparatory work from January 31 to February 6, including the addition of trees, grass, and snow. The area was closed to the public from February 4, and filming occurred from February 7–12, with some traffic disturbance. Clean-up took place from February 13–15. Fake horses were spotted on set. Okotoks residents noted that the production brought increased business to the area, with 28 storefront businesses supported by the production, leading to CA$18,000 in revenue for the town. Three or four large fans were used to imitate heavy snowfall; the temperature was around −17 °C (1 °F). Production moved to Waterton Lakes National Park from February 14–18, with on-set vehicles featuring Colorado license plates. Production occurred over winter while the park was closed, and some cabin interiors were used. Production designer John Paino and his team constructed the steakhouse where David preaches; Paino wanted its symmetry to reflect a church.

== Reception ==
=== Broadcast and ratings ===
The episode aired on HBO on March 5, 2023. The episode had 8.1 million viewers in the United States on its first night, including linear viewers and streams on HBO Max—an increase of 74% from the premiere episode. On linear television, it had 1.039 million viewers, with a 0.30 ratings share.

=== Critical response ===
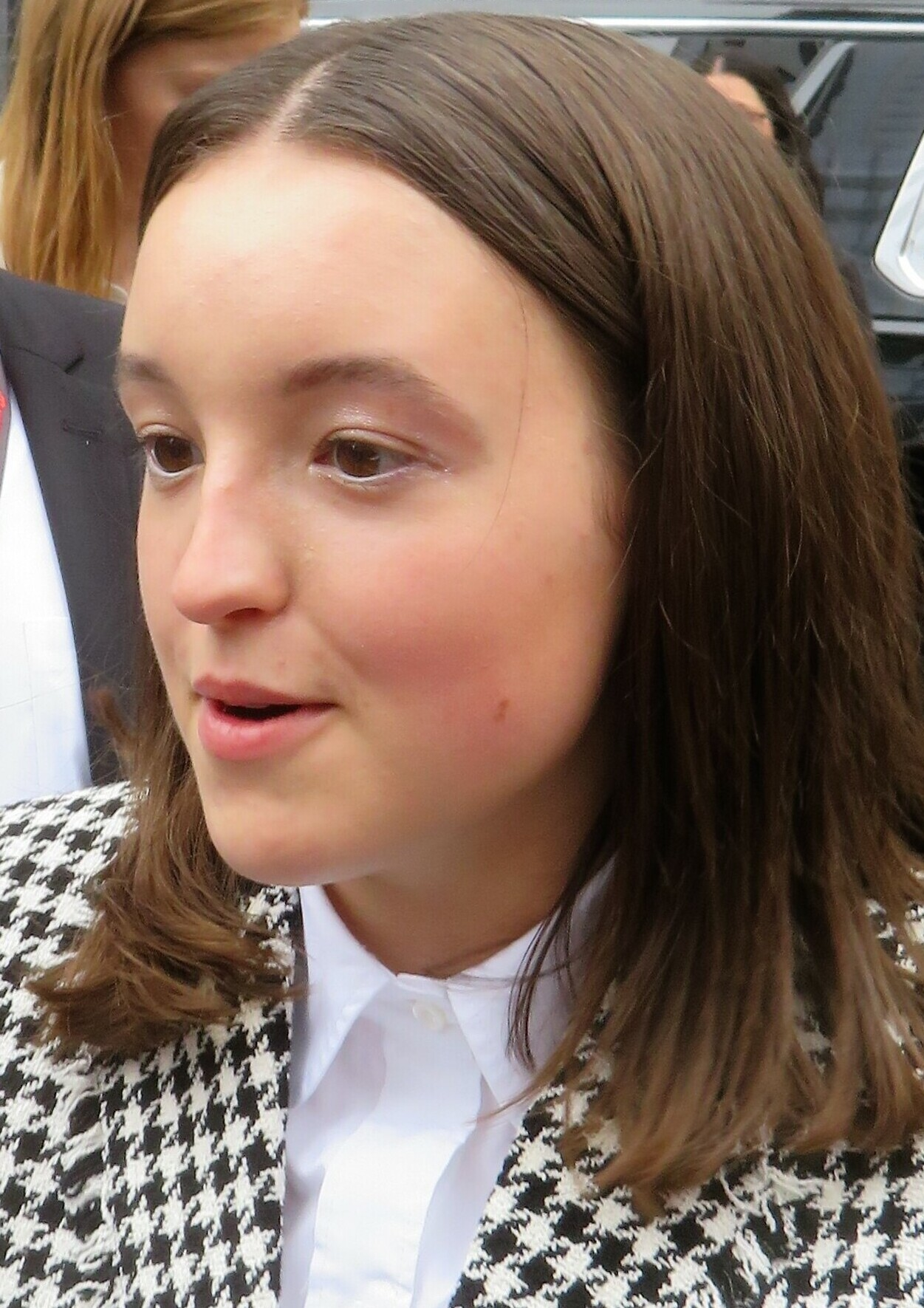
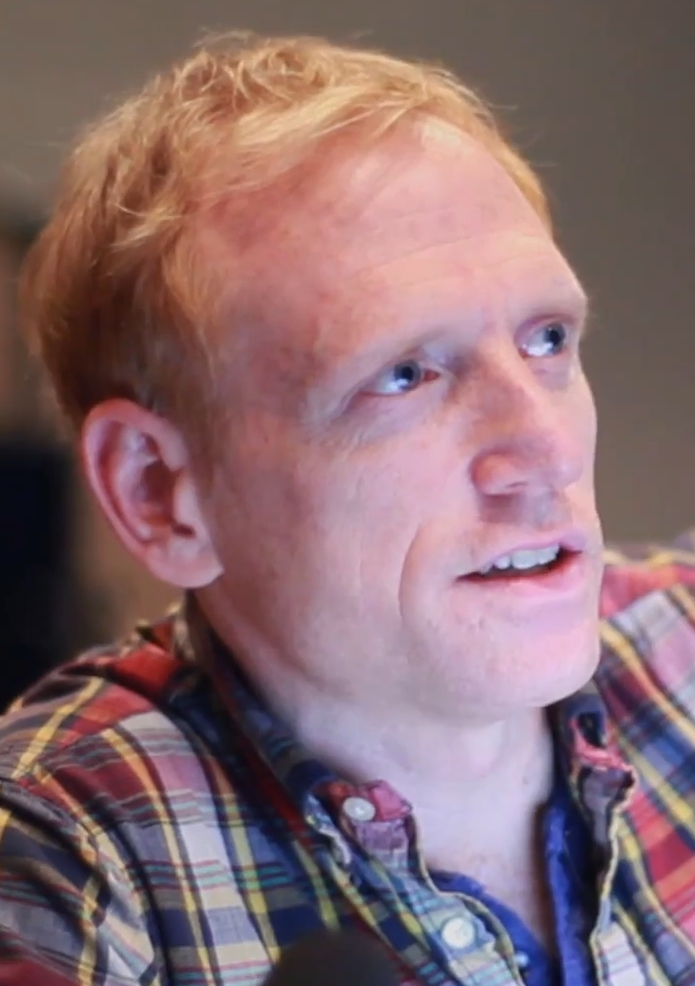
Critics widely praised the performances of Bella Ramsey (left) and Scott Shepherd (right).

On review aggregator Rotten Tomatoes, "When We Are in Need" has an approval rating of 97% based on 29 reviews, with an average rating of 8.1/10. The website's critical consensus reads "Scott Shepherd coolly underplays the personification of evil to chilling effect in ... a horrifying chapter that goes to prove that fungal zombies aren't necessary for this series to instill terror". IndieWire's Steve Greene praised the episode's cinematography, particularly the added tension of the close-up shots and the focus on Ellie's reaction while killing David. IGN's Simon Cardy compared the cinematography to picturesque Westerns and modern horror films, and lauded Gustavo Santaolalla's score during Ellie's horseback escape and the production design of David's camp.

Ramsey and Shepherd's performances received particular praise; Ramsey submitted the episode to support their nomination for Lead Actress in a Drama Series at the 75th Primetime Emmy Awards. Den of Geek's Bernard Boo lauded Ramsey's ability to portray toughness while maintaining vulnerability, and The Washington Post's Gene Park wrote their performance "should finally erase" any remaining doubts of their ability. CNET's Sean Keane called Shepherd's performance "charismatic", and IGN's Cardy considered him an effective adversary opposite Ramsey. IndieWire's Greene lauded Shepherd's ability to deliver otherwise stereotypical lines; The A.V. Club's David Cote wrote his performance "is masterful in its wry, understated charm". Bleeding Cool's Tom Chang felt Ramsey and Shepherd were unable to match the performances of the game's Ashley Johnson and Nolan North as Ellie and David, respectively, due to the pacing of the script, but wrote they "do their best with what they had to work with". Pedro Pascal's performance as Joel was well received for his portrayal of both anger and tenderness.

IndieWire's Greene praised the ambiguity introduced through Mazin's writing. IGN's Cardy felt the episode's contextual additions justified the adaptation of the game. The Escapist's Darren Mooney found Mazin used common tropes in an effective manner to enrich themes and characters. The A.V. Club's Cote lauded the episode's horrifying construction, attributing it to Mazin's writing and Abbasi's direction; Push Square's Aaron Bayne appreciated the grounded and barren depiction of David's group. The New York Times's Noel Murray admired the realism of Ellie's confusion with penicillin. Several critics considered the episode rushed; Bleeding Cool's Chang felt it would have been more effective as a two-parter to allow more time to build David's personality. Total Film's Bradley Russell found the final 15 minutes suffered from the rushed pacing, as it effectively remade the scenes from the video game. Den of Geek's Boo opined the story lacked the dramatic impact of the game, considering the religious overtones unnecessary, David's characterization incongruous, and the cannibalism reveal too heavy-handed.

Actor Rainn Wilson criticized the episode, accusing it of anti-Christian bias and adding that he would like to see "a Bible-reading preacher on a show who is actually loving and kind" to reflect his own experience with Christians; Wilson himself is a member of the Baháʼí Faith. Some Christian leaders supported his sentiment, though some journalists disagreed, citing sexual abuse in the Catholic Church, the influence of the Christian right on modern politics, and the fact that David is not actually a Christian by conviction, but a charlatan who uses Christianity to control his followers.
