= Daniel Kelly (sociologist) =

British sociologist

- Born: 1959 (age 66–67)
- Education: Goldsmiths College (PhD)
- Awards: Order of the British Empire, Fellow of the Royal Society of Arts
- Scientific career
- Fields: social psychology, nursing
- Workplaces: Cardiff University, Middlesex University
- Thesis: In the company of men: embodiment and prostate cancer (2002)
- Doctoral students: Sara Nasserzadeh

Daniel Martin Kelly (born 1959) is a British nurse and sociologist and the Royal College of Nursing Chair of Nursing Research at Cardiff University. He is known for his works on cancer and palliative care and received Order of the British Empire for his services to cancer care research and education. He was made a Fellow of the Royal College of Nursing in 2016.
