= Alice K. Ladas =

American psychologist and psychotherapist (1921–2023)

- Born: Alice Kahn Daniel; May 30, 1921; New York, New York, U.S.
- Died: July 29, 2023 (aged 102); Santa Fe, New Mexico, U.S.
- Education: Smith College; Washington School of Psychiatry; National Psychological Association for Psychoanalysis; Columbia University (EdD)
- Known for: Sexology and human sexuality; G-spot
- Spouse: Harold Samuel Ladas (m. 1962)
- Children: 2
- Scientific career
- Fields: Psychology

Alice Kahn Ladas (May 30, 1921 – July 29, 2023) was an American psychologist and psychotherapist. In 1982, she co-authored the book The G Spot and Other Recent Discoveries About Human Sexuality that argued for the existence of the Gräfenberg Spot and popularized the term G-Spot. She died on July 29, 2023, at the age of 102.

== Early life and education ==
=== Childhood ===
Alice Kahn was born on May 30, 1921, in Manhattan, New York, the daughter of Rosalie (née Heil) and Myron Daniel Kahn. Her mother was an interior designer and an early supporter of the Ethical Culture movement, an ethical, educational, and religious movement to develop humanist codes of behavior; her father was a cotton merchant.

Her parents divorced when she was two, after which she spent summers with her father in Montgomery, Alabama, and winters with her mother in Manhattan, New York. Ladas later attributed the progressive nature of her career to the breadth of experiences her unusual upbringing brought her, saying, "I had intercultural experiences few kids have...I think that led me to not fully accept the cultures I lived in and to be a pioneer."

=== Education ===
Ladas attended the Ethical Culture Fieldston School in Manhattan from kindergarten through high school, which prioritized the study and practice of ethics and ingrained in her the ideology that the central purpose of education is world betterment.

After this, Ladas attended Smith College, graduating cum laude in 1943 with a Bachelor of Arts degree in political science. Her thesis was titled, "Towards a Better Presidential System." She was also a member of the honor society Phi Beta Kappa. Ladas continued at Smith College, receiving her Master of Science in Social Work in 1947.

Concurrent to her master's program, Ladas also attended postgraduate studies at the Washington School of Psychiatry, an institute that provides postgraduate training to nonmedical psychotherapists, from 1944 to 1946. After completing her master's program, she continued her postgraduate studies from 1948 to 1950 at the National Psychological Association for Psychoanalysis: a training institute and membership organization that provides psychoanalysis training to individuals with degrees in medicine, psychology, social work, and the arts, founded on the principle that the requirement of a medical degree to practice psychoanalysis was both unnecessary and detrimental to the field.

Ladas finished her graduate studies at Teachers College, Columbia University, where she received her Doctor of Education in 1970. She wrote her doctoral dissertation on the topic of breastfeeding, working with the newly formed La Leche League. Although her proposal to write her dissertation on this topic was initially refused by faculty members, it was accepted after she persuaded the anthropologist Margaret Mead to sit on her dissertation committee. Her doctoral research was ultimately published in peer-reviewed journals in medicine and sociology. She was particularly fond of her doctoral work, later commenting, "That's what I'm most proud of. I believe it influenced, in the United States at least, more women to breastfeed."

== Personal life ==
During her undergraduate education at Smith College, Ladas participated in a student leadership program at the Roosevelts' Campobello Island home and summer retreat in New Brunswick, Canada, where she met Eleanor Roosevelt. Inspired by the first lady's feminism and activism, Dr. Ladas marched for civil rights in the South and in Washington.

She married Harold Samuel Ladas, a professor of psychology at Hunter College, on January 30, 1962. He died in 1989. They had two children, Robin Lee and Pamela Sue, and three grandchildren.

== Career ==
Ladas' career as a licensed psychologist and body psychotherapist would not only encompass psychotherapy, but also ultimately included efforts to educate on the topics of childbirth, breastfeeding, and sexuality.

As an undergraduate, Ladas served as an intern from 1943 to 1944 with the Fair Employment Practices Commission in Washington, D.C, where she was successful in upgrading the positions of Black workers at the Patent Office. She continued to work there as a field examiner during her graduate education from 1944 to 1947. In 1945, also during her master's program, she served as a voluntary case worker at the National Institute of Mental Hygiene, now the National Institute of Mental Health, and worked as a social worker at the Payne Whitney Psychiatric Clinic from 1946 to 1947.

During her master's program internship placement at the Jewish Board of Guardians, the precursor to the Jewish Board of Family and Children's Services, she met psychoanalyst and family therapy pioneer Nathan Ackerman. Ackerman hired Ladas once she completed her degree; thus 1947, she entered private practice as a family therapist in New York City and in Armonk, New York, and worked with Ackerman in that position until 1952.

From 1952 to 1957, she was the Director of Child Guidance at public schools in Caldwell, NJ.

Critical of traditional talk therapy, Ladas became a follower of the Austrian psychologist Wilhelm Reich, a developer of psychosexual theories centered on the orgasm, due to his incorporation of the body into methods of psyschotherapy. She joined his staff at the Infant Research Center in New York in the early 1950s. In 1956, she helped Reich's student Alexander Lowen found the Institute for Bioenergetic Analysis, which focuses on the bodily underpinnings of mental health.

Reich's work inspired Ladas to study infants and breastfeeding, for which she travelled to France to learn about the Lamaze technique of childbirth, whereby women are encouraged to move around and use controlled breathing and relaxation as tools to begin labor. Upon her return in 1959, she became instrumental in bringing the technique to an American audience as one of the first individuals to teach Lamaze classes in the United States.

Ladas worked as a counselor and assistant to the director at Maternal Care Adoption Service in Lakeville, CT, from 1957 to 1960. Then, partially during her doctoral studies, she was a staff member of the Young Women's Christian Association (YWCA) school in New York City from 1967 to 1973. In 1979, she became a member of staff of the Family Life Institute of Westchester County, NY.

In the 1970s, Dr. Ladas served on the boards of the Society for the Scientific Study of Sexuality, in Allentown, PA, and the International Institute of Bioenergetic Analysis, based in Barcelona, Spain. A study she conducted with her husband, Harold Ladas, about the effects of body psychotherapy on women's sexuality, led to her collaboration in the early 1980s with Beverly Whipple and John Perry on the pioneering book The G Spot and Other Recent Discoveries About Human Sexuality. Published in 1982, it became an international bestseller.
