= Eleanor Schill =

English medical doctor (1904–2005)

Eleanor Beatrice Schill MBE
- Born: 19 March 1904; Manchester, England
- Died: 26 December 2005 (aged 101)
- Education: Bedales School
- Alma mater: Victoria University of Manchester (MBChB)
- Occupation(s): Doctor, psychiatrist, philanthropist
- Organization: Marriage Guidance Council (co-founder)
- Spouse: Charles Ernest (Bill) Sykes
- Children: 5

Dr Eleanor Beatrice Schill MBE (19 March 1904 – 26 December 2005), also known as Mrs Sykes, was one of the first female medical doctors in England. She worked extensively in deprived communities in Manchester and was appointed MBE for her services.

== Early life ==
Eleanor Schill was born to Paul Schill and Beatrice Schill (née Melland) in Withington Hall, one of the most prestigious houses in Manchester on 19 March 1904. Her parents were active philanthropists, donating money to a number of projects in Manchester, including new premises of the Ardwick Lad's Club in 1898. Her mother came from a famous medical family and her father from a family of merchants, partners in Schill, Seebohm & Co based in Whitworth Street in the city centre. Her father's fortune was badly hit in the economic depression of the 1930s.

== Education ==
Schill was educated at Bedales, her time there having a profound effect on her Christian faith. From there she attended the Victoria University of Manchester where she studied medicine, one of the earliest female doctors to be trained there. Schill graduated MBChB in 1927, gaining her Diploma in Psychological Medicine in 1937.

== Medical practice ==
Schill had a long career as a practising physician, as a general practitioner, medical officer for a number of educational establishments and as a psychiatrist.

Upon qualifying, Schill initially worked as a medical officer to children at St Mary's Hospital, London. During the Second World War years she practised as a GP in Cheshire and Derbyshire and was the school doctor to Pehrhos College, a girls' boarding school in North Wales, when it was evacuated to Chatsworth House, Derbyshire.

Following the war Schill took up a post as the school doctor to Manchester High School for Girls, and in 1950 she is listed as the Medical Officer for Women Students in the Department of Education at the University of Manchester. In 1957 she was appointed a part time assistant psychiatrist at Withington Hospital.

== Counselling, community and social work ==
Shortly after leaving university Schill joined the committee for the McAlpine Home for unmarried mothers in Fallowfield, beginning a life of service to disadvantaged communities in Manchester. She carried on the philanthropic efforts she knew as a child, serving on a number of boards that had been previously served by her parents including the Manchester Girls Institute based in Ancoats and Ardwick Lads’ Club. She also served on the playing fields committee (the Melland playing fields in Gorton being a gift from her mother's family to Manchester City Council), and the board of Norbrook Youth Club.

Schill was a founding member of the Marriage Guidance Council, attending its inaugural meeting in 1939 and later becoming its vice-chairman, a post she held until 1970. She also served on the parole board of Styal Women's Prison.

== Honours ==
Schill was created MBE in 1995.

== Later life ==
Schill died on 26 December 2005 at the age of 101.

== Personal life ==
Schill met her future husband, Bill Sykes, while studying at Manchester. They had five children together. Schill's married name was Sykes but she practised medicine under her maiden name, an unusual choice at the time.
