= Relate =

UK relationship support charity

- Formation: 1938; 88 years ago
- Founder: Herbert Gray; Edward Fyfe Griffith; Eleanor Schill
- Type: Charity
- Location: United Kingdom
- Affiliations: Relationships Alliance
- Website: www.relate.org.uk
- Formerly called: National Marriage Guidance Council

Relate is a charity providing relationship support throughout England, Wales and Northern Ireland. Services include counselling for couples, families, young people and individuals, sex therapy, mediation and training courses. Relate also offers online services including webcam counselling and a therapeutic based LiveChat service.

It was founded in 1938 as the National Marriage Guidance Council, after a clergyman, Herbert Gray (1868-1956), noted that the divorce rate was increasing. Co-founders of the Council included the Methodist David Mace (1907-1990), the eugenicist Dr Edward Fyfe Griffith and Dr Eleanor Beatrice Schill MBE. The first funder of Relate was the British Eugenics Society. Relate expanded after the Second World War with government funding secured from the Home Office and later the Lord Chancellor's Department in the late 1940s. Relate celebrated its 75th birthday in 2013. Relate holds an annual lecture with previous speakers including David Cameron, Deirdre Sanders, Nick Clegg, Alan Johnson, Charles Handy and Alain de Botton.

Relate adopted its current name on Valentine's Day 1988. In the 1990s, Relate's public profile increased after Princess Diana became its patron in 1989. The current President of Relate is Prof. Janet Walker OBE. Former Presidents of Relate include Professor Sir Cary Cooper and comedian and writer Ruby Wax. The current Patrons of Relate are Tanya Byron and Bel Mooney. Current Vice President is Anjula Mutanda (elected 2018) and Author of How to do Relationships. Anjula Mutanda elected President of Relate November 2021.

Today, Relate sees over 150,000 clients a year, at more than 600 locations across the UK. Relate is a federated charity with Relate Centres operating across England, Wales and Northern Ireland. A separate charity, Relationships Scotland, provides similar services in Scotland. In 2017, Relate merged a third of its Centres into the national charity in response to funding cuts.

In 2006, Relate opened the Relate Institute, the UK's first Centre of Excellence for the study of relationships, in partnership with Doncaster College and the University of Hull. The Relate Institute closed in 2015. Baroness Tyler of Enfield was Chief Executive between 2007 and 2012 and was succeeded by Ruth Sutherland; Tyler is currently a Vice President of Relate.

Relate was a founding member of the Relationships Alliance which was launched in 2013 in partnership with OnePlusOne, Tavistock Relationships and Marriage Care.

== Relationship books ==
Title	Author	Description	Publisher
Personal Relationship Skills for beginning, strengthening, and maintaining an intimate personal relationship	Stephen J. Sampson Ph.D.; Cindy Elrod Ph.D.	The fundamental skills to maintain a personal relationship. Teaches social, intellectual and emotional skills to create a lasting and intimate relationship – based on scientific principles and research	HRD Press
Loving Yourself, Loving Another: The Importance of Self-esteem for Successful Relationships	Julia Cole	This text reveals how a lack of self-esteem can profoundly affect an individual's close relationships. Comprising exercises, advice, and self-awareness puzzles, this guide is designed to help the reader improve their emotional well-being.	Relate
Staying Together – From crisis to deeper commitment	Susan Quilliam	This guide offers advice on how to learn to come to terms with a failing relationship, assess whether it is worth saving, and how to overcome relationship difficulties.	Relate
Stop Arguing: Start Talking – The 10 point plan for couples in conflict	Susan Quilliam	Aims to help couples break free of old patterns of behaviour and avoid using words as weapons when the going gets tough. Encourages upfront discussion rather than resorting to nagging, and to bring discussion rather than confrontation back into your relationship.	Relate
Moving On – Breaking up without breaking down	Suzie Hayman	Information, advice and practical strategies to help you cope, as positively as possible, with the stress of breaking up with your partner.	Relate
Starting Again – How to learn from the past for a better future	Sarah Litvinoff	A guide to looking to a positive future after the grief of a failed relationship.	Relate
Simply Irresistible	Dr Raj Persaud	How to catch and keep your perfect partner	Bantam
Ten Lessons to Transform Your Marriage	Dr John Gottman	America's Love Lab Experts Share Their Strategies for Strengthening Your Relationship	Crown Publishers, 2006

Other publications - Relate booklist

== See also ==
- Loving kindness
- Marriage
- Outline of relationships
- Relationship education
