= Look for the Light =

- The Last of Us episode
- Joel and Ellie feed a giraffe. The scene, filmed at Calgary Zoo, was presented similar to the game to maintain the same impact. Critics praised its presentation and emotion.
- Episode no.: Season 1 Episode 9
- Directed by: Ali Abbasi
- Written by: Craig Mazin; Neil Druckmann
- Cinematography by: Nadim Carlsen
- Editing by: Timothy A. Good; Emily Mendez
- Original air date: March 12, 2023
- Running time: 43 minutes

Guest appearances
- Merle Dandridge as Marlene; Ashley Johnson as Anna

Episode chronology
| ← Previous "When We Are in Need" | Next → "Future Days" |
- The Last of Us season 1

"Look for the Light" is the ninth and final episode of the first season of the American post-apocalyptic drama television series The Last of Us. Written by series creators Craig Mazin and Neil Druckmann, and directed by Ali Abbasi, it aired on HBO on March 12, 2023. In the episode, Joel (Pedro Pascal) and Ellie (Bella Ramsey) arrive in Salt Lake City, Utah, in search of the hospital run by the Fireflies, led by Marlene (Merle Dandridge). A flashback follows Ellie's mother, Anna (Ashley Johnson), as she gives birth.

The episode was filmed in May 2022 in Calgary and Grande Prairie, Alberta. Ashley Johnson, who portrayed Ellie in the video games on which the series is based, guest starred as Anna, Ellie's mother; Mazin and Druckmann considered her inclusion important due to her proximity to the games. Druckmann had conceived Anna's story for the video games or related media but it was unused until the television series. The episode received positive reviews, with praise for its direction, cinematography, score, and performances of Pascal, Ramsey, and Johnson, though some critics found its pacing rushed. It was watched by 8.2 million viewers on its first day.

== Plot ==
A pregnant woman, Anna, flees a pursuing infected but is bitten as she gives birth to Ellie, infecting Anna before she can cut Ellie's umbilical cord. They are found by Marlene and a group of Fireflies. Anna begs Marlene to kill her and take Ellie back to Boston, Massachusetts, lying to her and insisting she was bitten after cutting Ellie's umbilical cord. Marlene hesitates before taking Ellie and executing Anna.

In the present, Joel and Ellie arrive in Salt Lake City, Utah, in search of the Fireflies' secret lab. Ellie, still traumatized after her encounter with David, (Note: As depicted in "When We Are in Need") is unusually taciturn until they encounter a herd of giraffes, which lifts her mood. Joel proposes that they return to Tommy's community in Jackson, Wyoming, and forget about their destination; Ellie counters, after all they have been through, she wants to finish their journey. Joel opens up about his suicide attempt after Sarah's death, and requests Ellie tell some jokes from her book. They are ambushed by Firefly soldiers, who capture Ellie and knock Joel unconscious.

After Joel awakens in a hospital, Marlene explains doctors believe Cordyceps has been growing in Ellie's brain since birth, giving her immunity. Joel recognizes that this means the Fireflies plan to surgically remove Ellie's brain, killing her. Marlene orders her soldiers to escort Joel out of the city; Joel subdues them and kills them. He moves through the hospital to the operating room and kills over a dozen Fireflies in his path, including those who surrender. When the lead surgeon operating on Ellie resists giving her up, Joel shoots him in the head. He takes the unconscious Ellie and attempts to leave the hospital. Marlene intercepts them in the parking garage and tells Joel he still has time to do the right thing; he shoots her. Marlene begs for mercy but Joel executes her, claiming she would hunt Ellie down if spared.

Ellie wakes up from anesthesia as Joel drives out of the city. Joel lies, telling her the Fireflies had found other immune people but were unable to create a cure, and that he escaped with Ellie after the hospital was attacked by raiders. After their car breaks down, they hike the rest of the way to Jackson. Ellie expresses survivor guilt and, at her insistence, Joel swears his story about the Fireflies is true; Ellie hesitates before replying "Okay".

== Production ==
=== Conception and writing ===
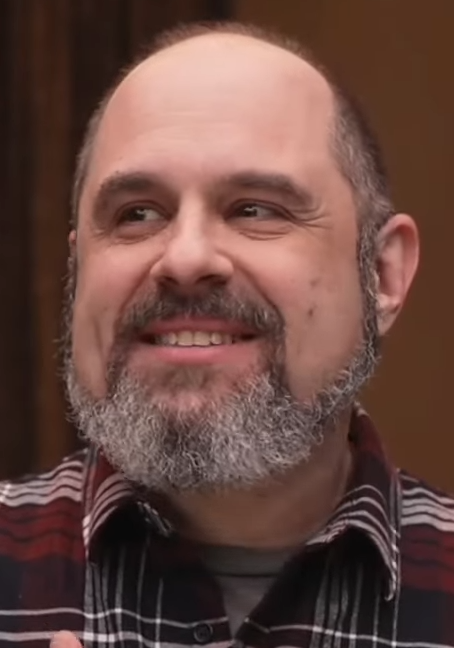
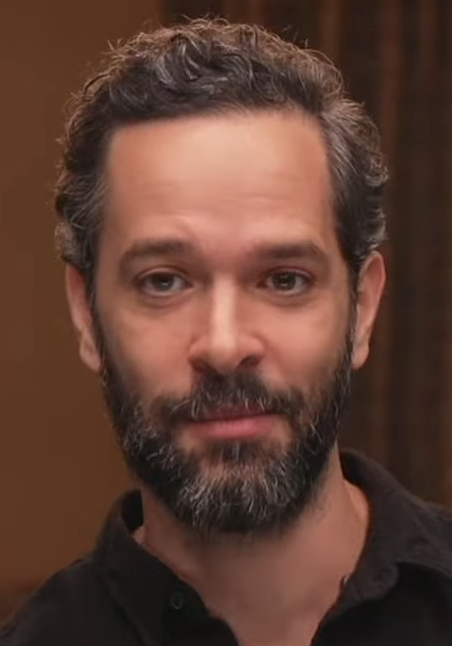
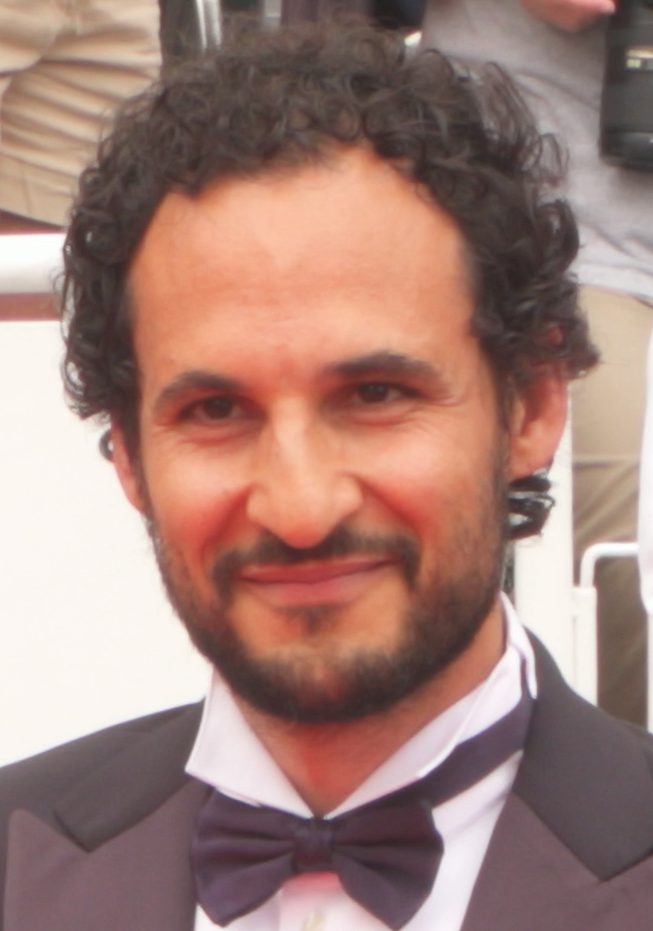
"Look for the Light" was written by series creators Craig Mazin (left) and Neil Druckmann (center), and directed by Ali Abbasi (right).

"Look for the Light" was written by The Last of Us series creators Craig Mazin and Neil Druckmann and directed by Ali Abbasi. Druckmann wrote and co-directed the video game on which the series is based. Abbasi was announced as one of the show's directors in April 2021. Mazin stepped in after Abbasi contracted COVID-19, directing some Anna scenes and Joel discussing his suicide attempt; the latter was the season's third-to-last day of production.

The writers always intended to include Anna's scenes in the finale's cold open; Mazin felt it had more impact after following Ellie's journey—particularly after her actions in the previous episode—and provided more context to Marlene's decision later in the episode. Mazin considered the imagery of Anna with a knife while holding Ellie "the most fucked up mother and child Pietà that you've ever seen". Druckmann identified similarities between Anna's lie about when she was bitten and Joel's lie about the Fireflies, and both Marlene and Ellie's respective acceptance of these lies as the alternatives are unbearable.

Mazin enjoyed the juxtaposition of Joel's actions upon meeting Ellie—using violence by aiming his gun at her—with his actions in the final episode—using violence to save Ellie. Druckmann and Mazin are fans of Unforgiven (1992), an action film with little violence until its conclusion, which they felt was reflected in the action scene in "Look for the Light". Druckmann found the scene as sad instead of epic as it is about protecting Ellie more than killing soldiers, as reflected by the music. Mazin attempted several variations of music for the sequence, including dark and action-heavy tracks; he ultimately chose Gustavo Santaolalla's "saddest" music from the game. In the game, the music plays as Joel is carrying Ellie out of the hospital; Mazin identified Joel's emotion during the action and escape scenes were ultimately the same.

Mazin wanted to present the giraffe scene similar to the game sequence, particularly for viewers unfamiliar with the game, as he found it "gorgeous". In the game, Joel becomes more vulnerable with Ellie after she gives him a photograph of his daughter; Druckmann and Mazin felt the moment was not as grounded in the television series and replaced it with Joel's story about his attempted suicide, which they hinted at in the third episode. Marlene's final scene was recreated similar to the game, including the editing choices, as Mazin found it powerful. He was a fan of the game's ending and never considered changing it for the series. At the request of executives at HBO, an alternative ending was filmed to set up the second season, focusing on Joel's face before following him and Ellie as they walk towards Jackson. Druckmann was opposed to the alternative ending and Mazin found it "soft" in context during editing, and it was removed. The footage was later used in the opening of the second-season premiere.

=== Casting and characters ===
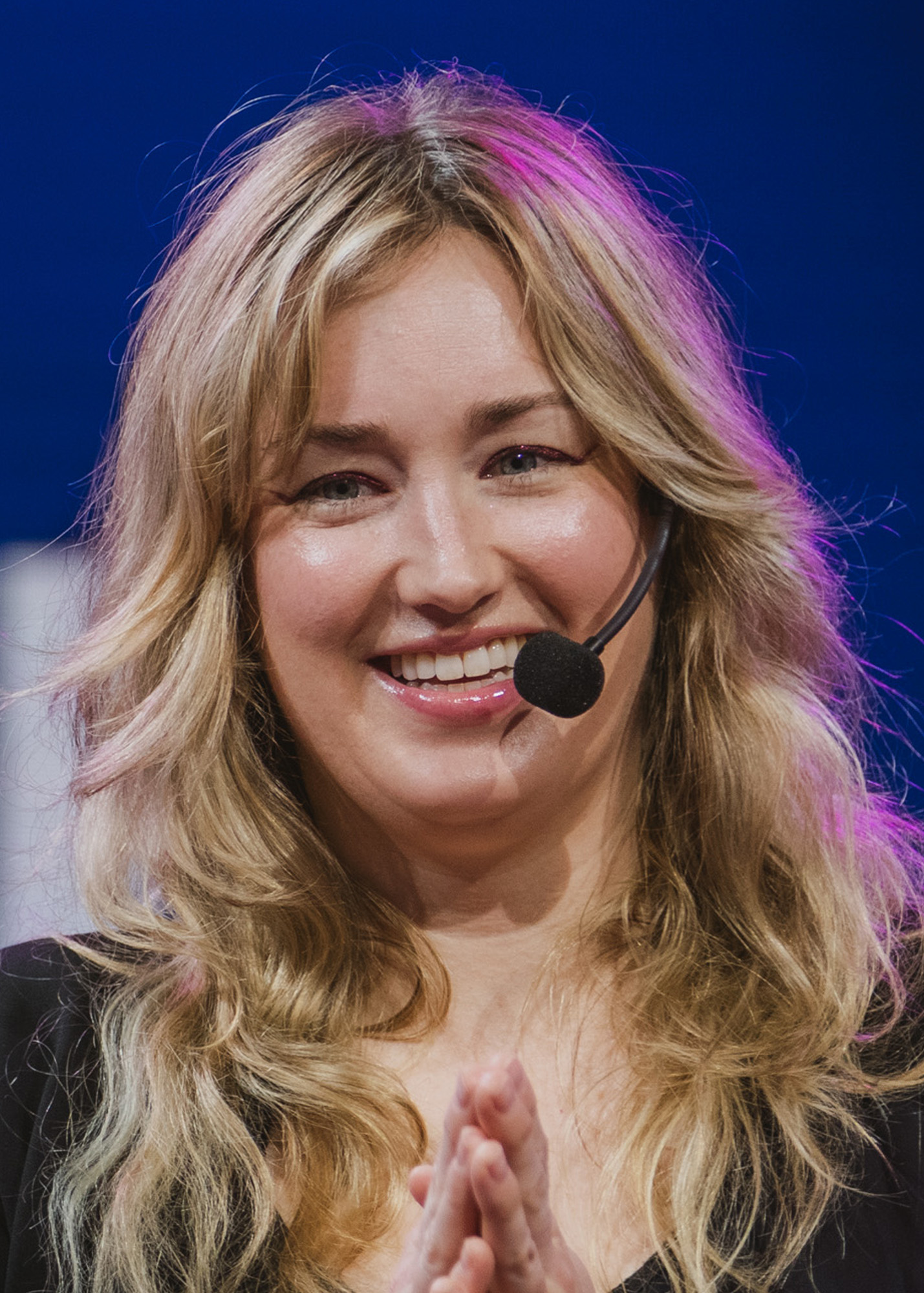
Ashley Johnson, who played Ellie in the games, portrayed Ellie's mother Anna in the episode.

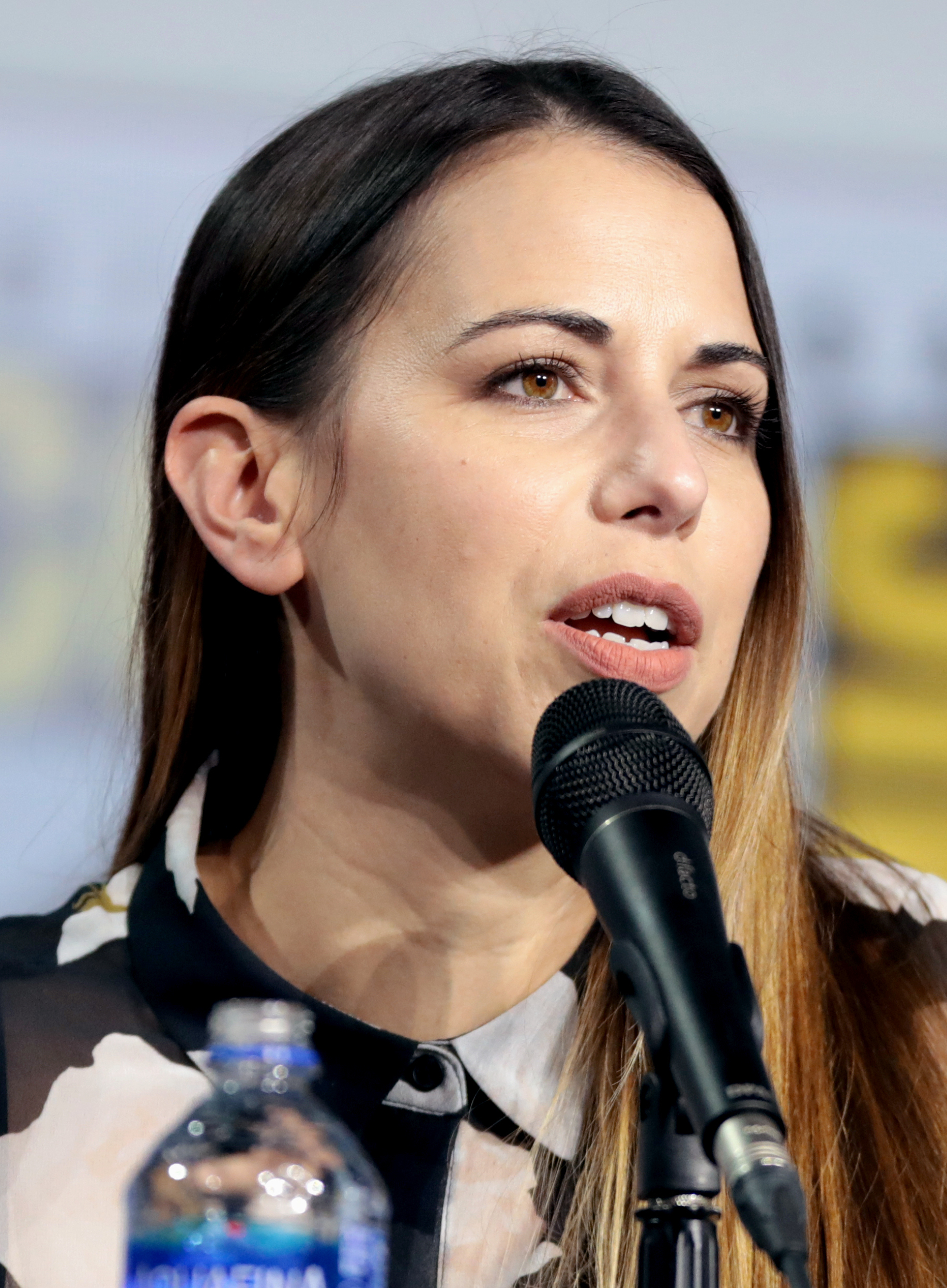
Laura Bailey, who played Abby in The Last of Us Part II, had a cameo appearance as a nurse.

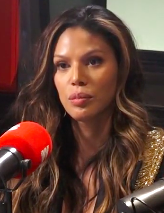
Merle Dandridge reprised her game role as Marlene in the television premiere and finale.

Ashley Johnson, who portrayed Ellie in the video games, was cast as Ellie's mother Anna in the episode. Druckmann was unable to explore Anna's story in the games but considered it personally important to include in the series; after the game's release, he wrote a short story about Anna, which was later intended to be adapted into an animated or live-action short film or released as downloadable content but "it fell apart". Mazin found the story "gorgeous" and upsetting and demanded its inclusion in the series. Mazin and Druckmann simultaneously thought of casting Johnson; they considered her inclusion important due to her relationship with the games. Abbasi was hesitant about working with actors from the games—he had also worked with Troy Baker, who played Joel in the games, in the previous episode—as he feared it was gimmicky, but found they added authenticity to the project.

Johnson cried after Druckmann offered her the role via text. She watched some of Ramsey's performance to match Ellie's mannerisms as Anna, and referred to her original combat style as Ellie for her fighting scene with an infected. She watched videos of natural births to prepare for the role, and recreated an in-game letter from Anna to Ellie and kept it in her pocket as a reminder of the character's origins. The production crew considered dressing Anna in pants but found a dress more logical; Johnson felt its bright colors reflected the character "holding onto the old world a little bit". Johnson's scenes were filmed over four days. She was nervous about working on the series without Druckmann—he spent several months away from set—as it was one of the first times she had worked on a Last of Us project without him, but he insisted she trust Mazin.

Kelsey Andries, who played the infected in the cold open, attained a black eye while filming the fight scene. Merle Dandridge, who played Marlene in the games and the television series, found the cold open provided important context for the relationship between Marlene and Anna, and was happy to work alongside Johnson again. She tried to forget her performance in the game and focus on the contextual differences in Marlene's scenes with Joel, particularly noting the differences in the script and location. Dandridge cried while recording automated dialogue replacement for the episode—a first for her—as she found Anna's death so emotional. She "had a really hard time" while filming Marlene's final scenes, partly due to the overwhelming emotions of the character's decision and consequences. Laura Bailey had a cameo appearance as a nurse, the same character she played in the game; she also portrayed Abby in The Last of Us Part II (2020). Bailey had requested an appearance in the series. According to Mazin, she cried while looking at the hospital set.

=== Filming ===
Nadim Carlsen worked as cinematographer for the episode. Production took place around Grande Prairie in early-to-mid May 2022; the crew were looking for at least 20–30 extras for production. Production designer John Paino thought his team would be required to build the hospital set, but the sequences were filmed in unused floors of the Queen Elizabeth II Hospital. Paino's team repainted and added aging to the hospital, and painted the pediatric wing's murals to match the game. He added construction lights to "give a dark and moody vibe" and demonstrate the hospital was powered by portable generators, as well as plastic barriers to reflect the isolation of the infected immediately after the outbreak.

The giraffe scenes were crafted with several locations, including a soundstage for the construction site and a platform at the Calgary Zoo, which houses three giraffes. The crew helped the zookeepers place green screens within the enclosure to aid in visual effects; this was done gradually over a month-and-a-half to ensure the giraffes remained comfortable. Pedro Pascal and Bella Ramsey, who portray Joel and Ellie, stood on a balcony in the enclosure, and the zookeepers acclimated the giraffes to being fed by strangers. Paino considered the sequence "probably the most complicated piecing of [visual effects] stage, scenery, and location I've worked on".

== Reception ==
=== Broadcast and ratings ===
The episode aired on HBO on March 12, 2023, followed by a 31-minute special chronicling the production of the series. The episode had 8.2 million viewers in the United States on its first night, including linear viewers and streams on HBO Max—an increase of 75% from the premiere episode. On linear television, it had 1.04 million viewers, with a 0.33 ratings share. It had over 3 million viewers in the United Kingdom, topping House of the Dragon's first season finale as Sky's most-viewed finale for an American debut series; around 1.2 million viewers watched on Sky Atlantic.

=== Critical response ===
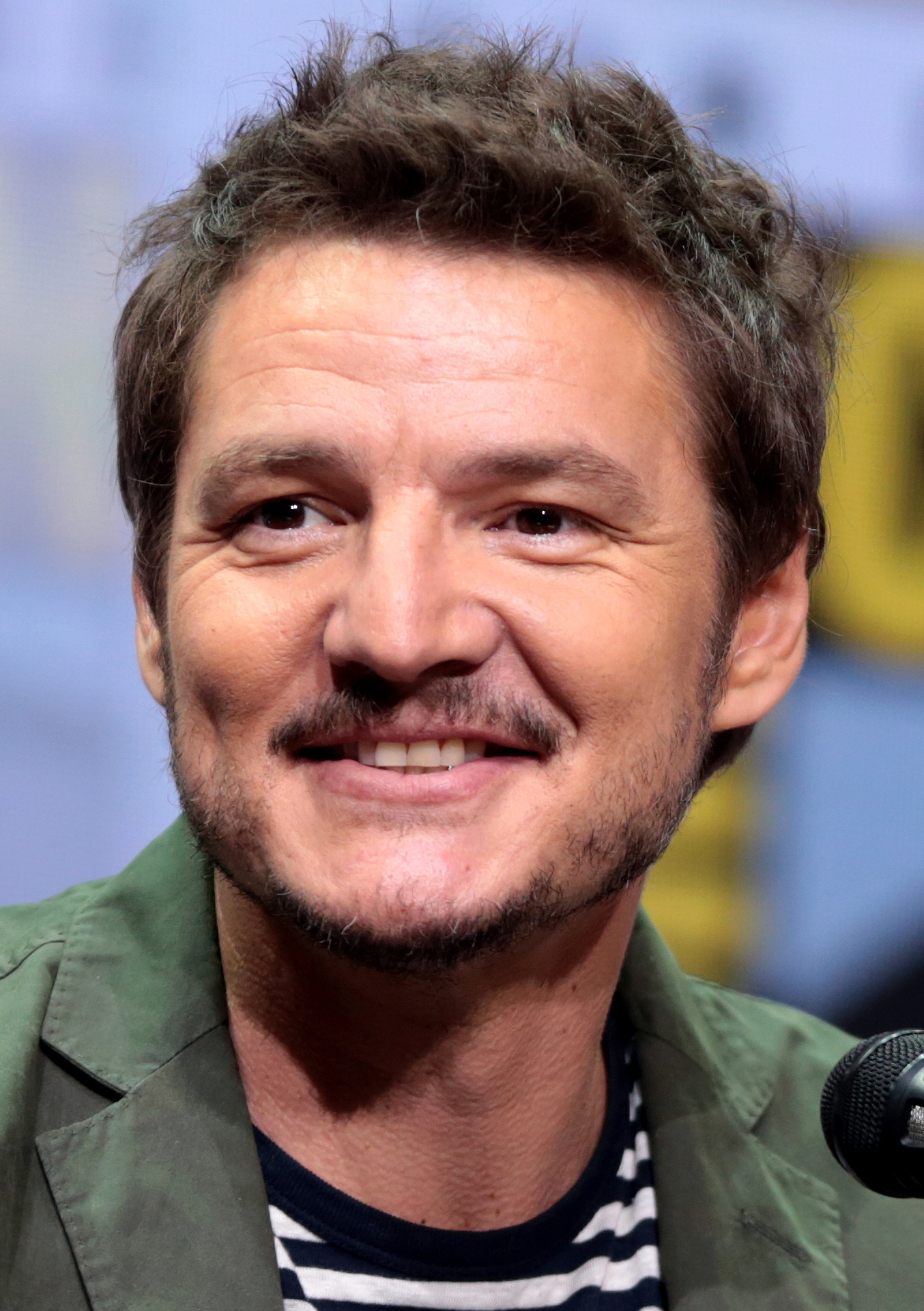
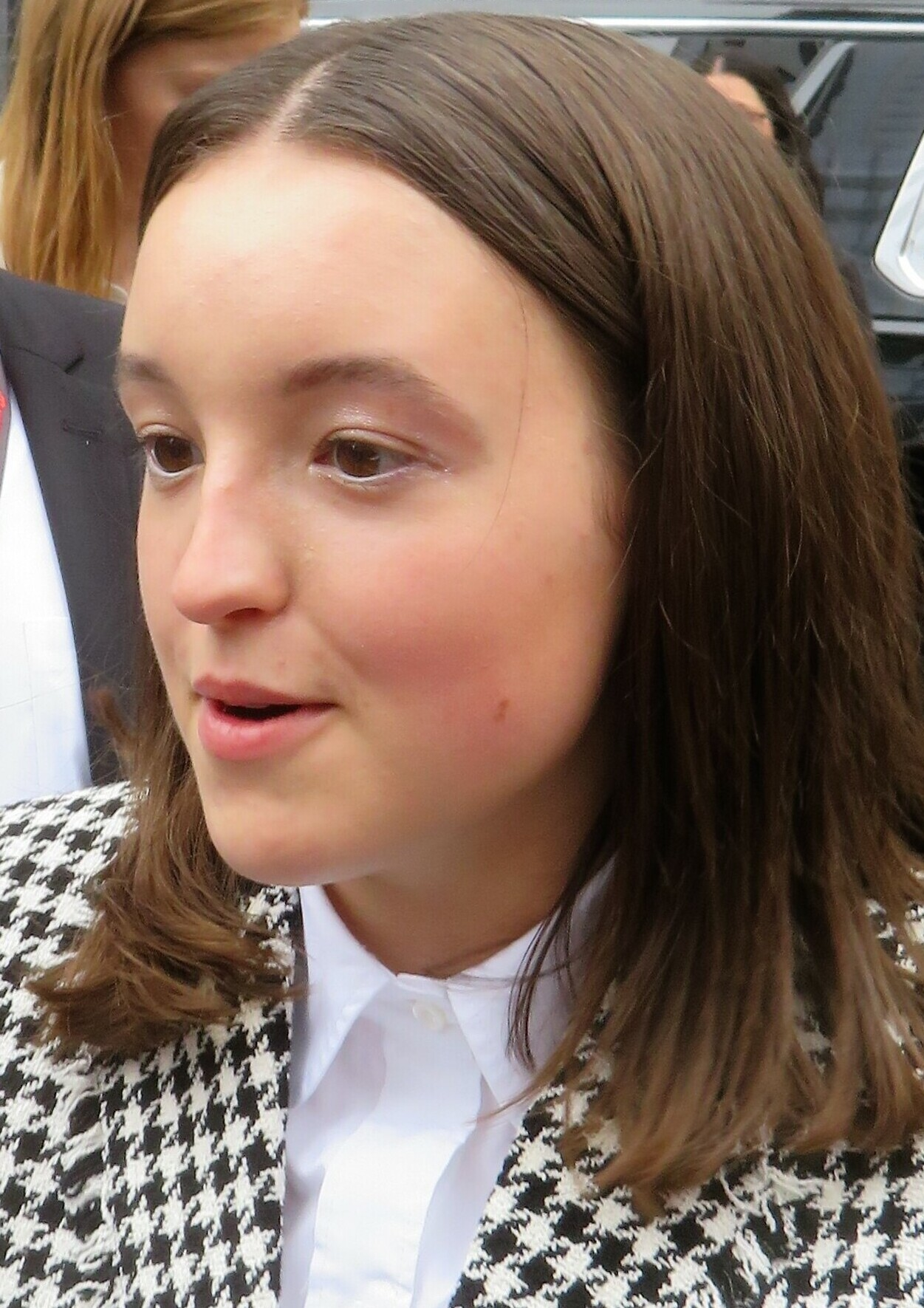
The performances of Pedro Pascal and Bella Ramsey were widely praised by critics.

On review aggregator Rotten Tomatoes, "Look for the Light" has an approval rating of 92% based on 37 reviews, with an average rating of 8.6/10. The website's critical consensus called the episode "swiftly paced to the point of feeling needlessly abbreviated", ending "with a morally ambiguous about-face that will give viewers plenty to contemplate". Critics praised the chemistry between Pascal and Ramsey. Several reviewers lauded Pascal's range of demonstrating terror, fragility, and rage. The New York Times's Noel Murray commended Ramsey's unique portrayal of Ellie's emotional shutdown, noting she "is clearly lost in her own thoughts, but she is never entirely unresponsive". The A.V. Club's David Cote enjoyed Ramsey's touching final speech, and The Atlantic's David Sims called them "dead on in conveying Ellie's suspicion". TVLine named Ramsey the Performer of the Week, calling them "one of the most dynamic young presences on TV". Den of Geek's Bernard Boo enjoyed Johnson's inclusion as Anna, and Total Film's Bradley Russell lauded her simultaneous portrayal of "pain and maternal instinct".

Reviewers praised Abbasi's direction and Carlsen's cinematography. The A.V. Club's Cote highlighted the framing of the Firefly ambush and favorably compared the action sequence to the game's third-person camera. The Escapist's Darren Mooney lauded Abbasi's decision to anchor the camera on Joel's perspective during the action scene, making it more brutal and unsettling. /Film's Rafael Motamayor lauded the use of practical sets in the military medical camp but found the visual effects of the giraffe scene underwhelming. Santaolalla's score received praise, particularly the mournful music during the action sequence; Total Film's Russell considered the scene's music among the season's strongest and lauded the increasing tension of the final track. The Salt Lake City set was nominated for Outstanding Created Environment (Note: Nominees: Pascal Raimbault, Nick Cattell, Jasper Hayward, and Kristine-Joeann Jasper) at the 22nd Visual Effects Society Awards.

The Escapist's Mooney described the episode as having "masterful storytelling", citing its ambiguous ending and inscrutable characters. Several reviewers found the giraffe scene touching and enjoyable and the cold open effective in its messaging. The New York Times's Murray praised Ellie's fragility in her opening scenes, and Total Film's Russell enjoyed the vulnerability depicted in her relationship with Joel. Den of Geek's Boo found "Joel's murderous rampage ... pretty damn near perfect" as a character arc, having been built throughout the season; Push Square's Aaron Bayne commended the faithfulness of the scene's brutality, though Slate's Sam Adams felt Joel possessed an unrealistic invulnerability. Los Angeles Times's Lorraine Ali considered the episode rushed; Push Square's Bayne felt the pacing resulted in a lesser emotional impact than the game. Den of Geek's Boo bemoaned the lack of a final action sequence against infected, but Bleeding Cool's Tom Chang found this omission an improvement.
