= The Science of Orgasm =

2006 book

- Author: Beverly Whipple, Barry R. Komisaruk, Carlos Beyer-Flore
- Language: English
- Subject: orgasm
- Publisher: Johns Hopkins University Press
- Publication date: 2006
- Pages: 376
- ISBN: 978-0-8018-8490-0

The Science of Orgasm is a 2006 book by Beverly Whipple, Barry R. Komisaruk and Carlos Beyer-Flores in which the authors explore research findings about orgasm and other aspects of human sexuality.
