= Relate Institute =

The Relate Institute is a department of Doncaster College, based at the High Melton campus, providing courses in relationship studies at various levels. It is a collaborative project between Relate, Doncaster College, and the University of Hull. The Relate Institute opened in September 2006, and is classified as a "centre of excellence" for the study of relationships.

The Higher Education Programmes are validated by the University of Hull.

The range of programmes offered by the Relate Institute enable the students to begin at entry-level, or to expand their knowledge of working with couples, families, and individuals with relationship issues or sexual problems.

In February 2007, the Alan Johnson MP, Secretary of State for Education and Skills, delivered the inaugural lecture of the Relate Institute. Since then, the lecture has been delivered by David Cameron MP, Nick Clegg MP, and Professor Cary Cooper of Lancaster University.
