= Ali Abbasi (director) =

Iranian-Swedish-Danish filmmaker (born 1981)

- علی عباسی
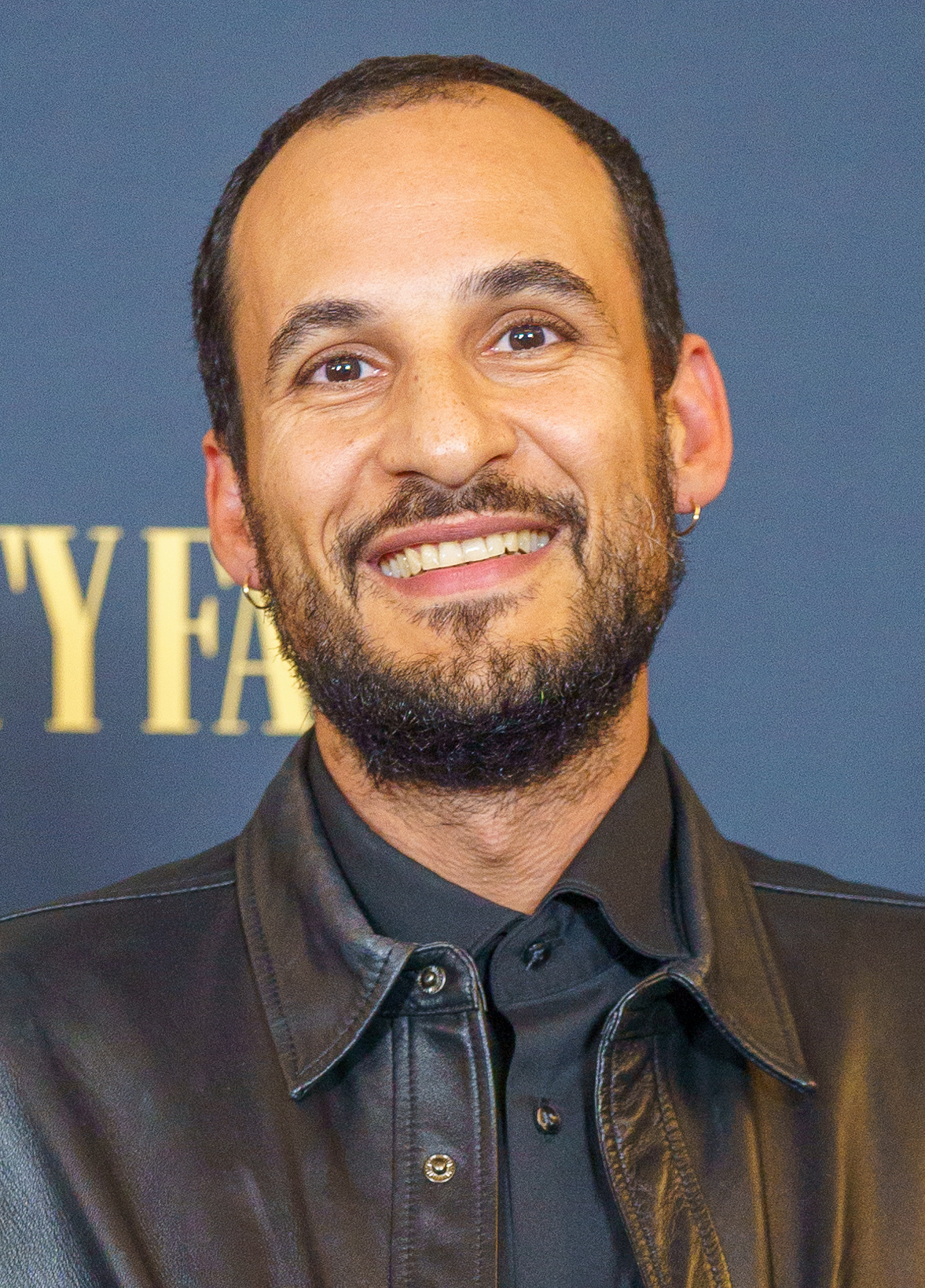
- Abbasi in 2024
- Born: 1981 (age 44–45); Tehran, Iran
- Education: Tehran Polytechnic; KTH Royal Institute of Technology; National Film School of Denmark
- Occupations: Director; screenwriter; producer
- Years active: 2008–present

Ali Abbasi (Persian: علی عباسی, born 1981) is an Iranian-Swedish-Danish filmmaker. He is known for his films Shelley (2016), Border (2018), Holy Spider (2022), and The Apprentice (2024). Abbasi also directed the last two episodes of the first season of the series The Last of Us. He has received various accolades, including an Un Certain Regard award, four Robert Awards, and a German Film Award, in addition to nominations for seven European Film Awards, a Goya Award, and two Guldbagge Awards. His films have also been nominated for multiple Academy Awards.

== Early life ==
Abbasi attended Tehran Polytechnic until 2002, when he emigrated to Sweden to study architecture at the KTH Royal Institute of Technology in Stockholm. After earning his bachelor of arts in 2007, he enrolled at the National Film School of Denmark, earning a degree in 2011 with the short film M for Markus.

== Career ==
=== 2018: Border ===
In 2018, Abbasi premiered his second film, Border. It won the Un Certain Regard award at the Cannes Film Festival, was selected as the Swedish entry for the Best Foreign Language Film at the 91st Academy Awards. Although the film didn't get a nomination in that category, it earned a nomination for Best Makeup and Hairstyling.

=== 2022: Holy Spider ===
His third feature film, Holy Spider, came out in 2022 and was a Persian-language co-production between Sweden, Denmark, France, and Germany. Based on the true story of Saeed Hanaei, a serial killer who targeted sex workers and killed sixteen women from 2000 to 2001 in Mashhad, Iran, the film depicts a fictional female journalist investigating a serial killer.

The film was selected to compete for the Palme d'Or at the 2022 Cannes Film Festival, where it premiered on 22 May 2022. Zar Amir Ebrahimi, who starred in the film, won the festival's Best Actress Award. The film was selected as the Danish entry for Best International Feature Film at the 95th Academy Awards, and made the December shortlist.

=== 2024: The Apprentice ===
Abbasi's latest film, The Apprentice, a portrait of a young Donald Trump, premiered at the 2024 Cannes Film Festival. The film was nominated for two Oscars at the 97th Academy Awards, including Best Actor for Sebastian Stan and Best Supporting Actor for Jeremy Strong.

== Personal life ==
Abbasi lives in Copenhagen and continues to hold an Iranian passport.

=== Groping allegation ===
In February 2025, Abbasi was accused of groping an unnamed actor at a Golden Globes after-party hosted by Creative Artists Agency (CAA). No named witnesses publicly came forward about the alleged incident, however. Abbasi himself released a statement clarifying his account of what occurred. Initial reports suggested that Abbasi was dropped by his own representatives at CAA as well as by his management and legal teams, due to the incident, but Abbasi clarified in his statement that he himself had ended those relationships in "a long-term career decision".

== Filmography ==
=== Film ===
Year	Title	Director	Writer	Notes	Ref(s)
2008	Officer Relaxing After Duty	Yes	Yes	Short film	
2010	In the Darkness Is the Light	Yes	Yes	Short film	
2011	M for Markus	Yes	Yes	Short film, also editor	
2016	Shelley	Yes	Yes		
2018	Border	Yes	Yes		
2022	Holy Spider	Yes	Yes	Also co-producer	
2024	The Apprentice	Yes	No		

=== Television ===
Year	Title	Episode(s)	Director	Writer	Notes	Ref(s).
2023	The Last of Us	"When We Are in Need", "Look for the Light"	Yes	No	2 episodes	

== Critical reception ==
Year	Title		Rotten Tomatoes	Metacritic	Ref(s)
2016	Shelley		92%	62	
2018	Border		97%	75	
2022	Holy Spider		84%	66	
2023	The Last of Us	"When We Are in Need"	96%	84	
2023	The Last of Us	"Look for the Light"	89%	84	
2024	The Apprentice		83%	64	

== Awards and nominations ==
Name of award ceremony, year presented, category, nominee, and nomination result
Award	Year	Category	Nominated Work	Result	Ref.
Bodil Awards	2017	Best Danish Film	Shelley	Nominated	
Bodil Awards	2019	Best Non-American Film	Border	Nominated	
Bodil Awards	2023	Best Danish Film	Holy Spider	Nominated	
Bodil Awards	2023	Best Screenplay	Holy Spider	Won	
Cannes Film Festival	2018	Un Certain Regard	Border	Won	
Cannes Film Festival	2022	Palme d'Or	Holy Spider	Nominated	
Cannes Film Festival	2024	Palme d'Or	The Apprentice	Nominated	
Chicago International Film Festival	2018	Gold Hugo	Border	Nominated	
Cork International Film Festival	2018	Spirit of the Festival Award	Border	Won	
Cinema for Peace awards	2025	Political Film of the Year	The Apprentice	Nominated	
Denver International Film Festival	2018	Krzysztof Kieslowski Award	Border	Nominated	
European Film Awards	2018	Best Film	Border	Nominated	
European Film Awards	2018	Best Screenwriter	Border	Nominated	
European Film Awards	2018	Best Director	Border	Nominated	
European Film Awards	2019	Lux Award	Border	Nominated	
European Film Awards	2022	Best Film	Holy Spider	Nominated	
European Film Awards	2022	Best Screenwriter	Holy Spider	Nominated	
European Film Awards	2022	Best Director	Holy Spider	Nominated	
Fantastic Fest	2022	Best Director	Holy Spider	Won	
German Film Award	2023	Best Director	Holy Spider	Nominated	
German Film Award	2023	Best Film in Bronze	Holy Spider	Won	
Goya Awards	2020	Best European Film	Border	Nominated	
Guldbagge Awards	2019	Best Director	Border	Nominated	
Guldbagge Awards	2019	Best Screenplay	Border	Nominated	
Jerusalem Film Festival	2018	Best International Film – Honorable Mention	Border	Won	
Jerusalem Film Festival	2022	Best International Film	Holy Spider	Nominated	
Los Angeles Film Festival	2018	Best World Fiction Film	Border	Won	
Munich Film Festival	2018	CineVision Award	Border	Nominated	
Norwegian International Film Festival	2018	Film Critics Award	Border	Won	
Oslo Films from the South Festival	2022	Silver Mirror Award	Holy Spider	Nominated	
Palm Springs International Film Festival	2019	Directors to Watch	Border	Won	
Palm Springs International Film Festival	2019	Best Foreign Language Film	Border	Nominated	
Robert Awards	2017	Best Original Screenplay	Shelley	Nominated	
Robert Awards	2019	Best Non-American Film	Shelley	Won	
Robert Awards	2023	Best Danish Film	Holy Spider	Won	
Robert Awards	2023	Best Director	Holy Spider	Won	
Robert Awards	2023	Best Original Screenplay	Holy Spider	Won	
San Sebastián Horror and Fantasy Film Festival	2018	Blogos de Oro for Best Feature	Border	Won	
Seville European Film Festival	2022	Golden Giraldillo	Holy Spider	Nominated	
Stockholm Film Festival	2022	Bronze Horse	Holy Spider	Won	
Tallinn Black Nights Film Festival	2022	DDA Spotlight Award	Holy Spider	Won	
Transilvania International Film Festival	2016	Transilvania Trophy	Shelley	Nominated	
Valladolid International Film Festival	2018	Golden Spike	Border	Nominated	

Directed Academy Award performances
Under Abbasi's direction, these actors have received Academy Award nominations for their performances in their respective roles.

Year	Performer	Film	Result
Academy Award for Best Actor
2024	Sebastian Stan	The Apprentice	Nominated
Academy Award for Best Supporting Actor
2024	Jeremy Strong	The Apprentice	Nominated
