= Future Days (The Last of Us) =

- The Last of Us episode
- Ellie looks upon a New Year's Eve party in Jackson. Filmed on a hand-held camera, the shot was framed to specifically match the video game, for which it was praised.
- Episode no.: Season 2 Episode 1
- Directed by: Craig Mazin
- Written by: Craig Mazin
- Cinematography by: Ksenia Sereda
- Editing by: Emily Mendez; Timothy A. Good
- Original air date: April 13, 2025
- Running time: 60 minutes

Guest appearances
- Kaitlyn Dever as Abby; Rutina Wesley as Maria; Robert John Burke as Seth; Spencer Lord as Owen; Tati Gabrielle as Nora; Ariela Barer as Mel; Danny Ramirez as Manny; Ezra Agbonkhese as Benjamin "Benji"; Finn Higgins as Caleb; Noah Lamanna as Kat; Catherine O'Hara as Gail

Episode chronology
← Previous "Look for the Light"	Next → "Through the Valley"
- The Last of Us season 2

"Future Days" is the first episode of the second season of the American post-apocalyptic drama television series The Last of Us. Written and directed by series co-creator Craig Mazin, it aired on HBO on April 13, 2025. Set five years after the events of the first season, the episode follows Joel (Pedro Pascal) and Ellie (Bella Ramsey), whose relationship has become strained as a result of Joel's lie in the previous episode. They have settled into Jackson, Wyoming, with Joel's brother Tommy (Gabriel Luna) and Ellie's friends Dina (Isabela Merced) and Jesse (Young Mazino).

The episode was filmed in February and March 2024 in British Columbia, including in Britannia Beach where the town of Jackson was built on a private property. It introduces several characters, including Dina, Jesse, Abby (Kaitlyn Dever), and Gail (Catherine O'Hara), for whom the writers made several changes from the games to fit the medium. Critics considered the episode a strong opening chapter which largely serves to establish the remainder of the season, praising the direction, cinematography, writing, and performances of Pascal, Ramsey, and O'Hara; the latter was nominated for Guest Actress in a Drama Series at the 77th Primetime Creative Arts Emmy Awards. The episode was watched by 5.3 million viewers on its first day.

== Plot ==
Joel swears to Ellie that his story about the Fireflies (Note: In "Look for the Light", Joel tells Ellie that the Fireflies had found other immune people but were unable to create a cure.) is true; Ellie hesitates before replying "Okay", and they walk towards the safe settlement of Jackson, Wyoming. In Salt Lake City, a group of Fireflies are burying their dead from the hospital massacre. (Note: The hospital massacre was depicted in "Look for the Light".) One of them, Abby, insists that they track down Joel but is dissuaded by Owen, who suggests they regroup in Seattle first. She vows to kill Joel slowly.

Five years later, at the end of 2028, Ellie and Joel have become increasingly estranged from each other. During combat training, leader Jesse orders Ellie's opponent show restraint, fearing Joel's aggression, but Ellie demands equal treatment. Joel's brother, Tommy, takes Ellie off patrol at Joel's request, but Ellie insists on following through with her assignment. While clearing out a group of infected in an abandoned supermarket with her close friend Dina, Ellie is confronted by a new type of infected capable of stalking her and moving silently; she kills it after it bites her and they later report its existence to the council in Jackson.

With Joel and the other townspeople rebuilding the derelict buildings across Jackson, Maria instructs him to work faster in order to accommodate the town's growing population of refugees. Joel suggests that the town council stop allowing them in, to which Maria points out that both he and Ellie came to Jackson as refugees. Joel has his session with psychotherapist Gail, who admits her resentment toward him for killing her husband Eugene. Overcome with emotion, Joel confesses to saving Ellie. At a New Year's Eve party, Dina dances with Ellie and they kiss, prompting bar owner Seth to use a homophobic slur. After Joel attacks Seth, Ellie tells him she does not need his help, and he leaves. She later encounters him playing guitar on his porch but does not speak to him.

Unbeknownst to the townsfolk, infected tendrils begin to enter Jackson through a broken pipe as Abby and her friends arrive nearby and observe the town at a distance.

== Production ==
=== Conception and writing ===
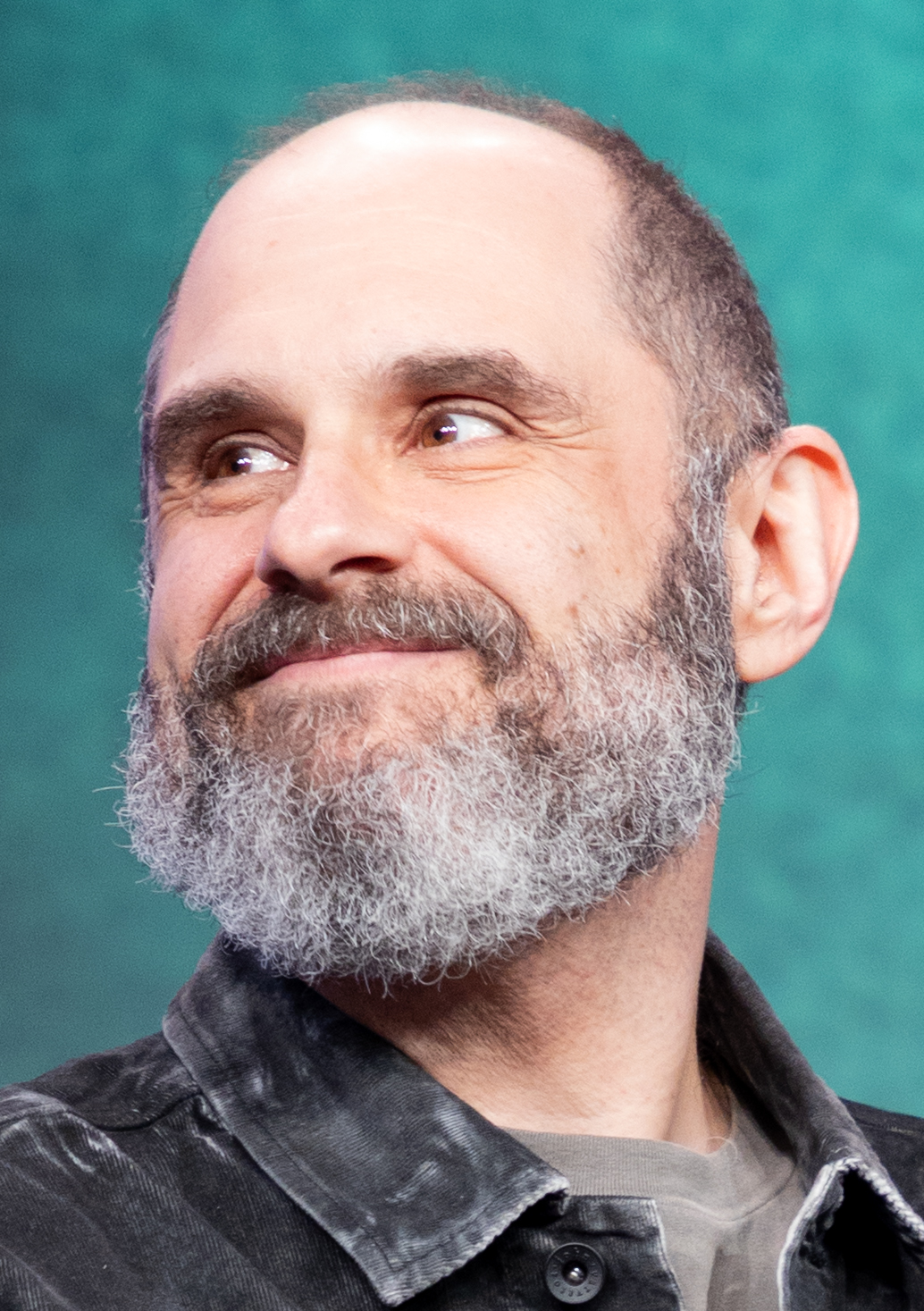
"Future Days" was written and directed by series co-creator Craig Mazin.

The Last of Us series co-creator Craig Mazin wrote and directed "Future Days", based on the 2020 video game The Last of Us Part II. The season's scripts were being written by April 2023, but writing was impacted by the Writers Guild of America strike in May; Mazin submitted "Future Days" about 90 minutes before the strike began. Inspired by Noah Hawley's work on the television series Fargo, Mazin felt directing the season premiere allowed him to prepare the full season, and he subsequently worked closely with each director on set. HBO revealed the episode's title and runtime on March 24, 2025. It is named after the Pearl Jam song "Future Days", which features in the game; while the song did not exist in 2003, when the outbreak takes place in the television series, Mazin and Druckmann felt its inclusion was important and thematically appropriate to Joel and Ellie's character arcs.

The episode opens with unused footage from the first-season finale, showing Joel's reaction to Ellie's comment and the two walking towards Jackson. Druckmann and Mazin found these an appropriate opening for the episode as the conversation establishes Joel and Ellie's conflict throughout the season, and the additional shots of Joel's reaction (also absent from the games) demonstrate his commitment to maintaining the lie. The stalker scene was included to show how the infected can evolve, while also demonstrating a possible sadness within each creature. Costume designer Ann Foley dressed the stalker in a blouse from Gap, "something [she] would have given to [her] mother for Mother's Day", which "made it scarier" in its relatability. Mazin said the tendrils growing inside a pipe in Jackson was caused by the residents' need to "master [their] environment", ultimately disrupting the world while achieving industry: breaking the pipe was a noble effort to build homes for refugees but it has consequences, allowing the tendrils into Jackson.

A scene featuring Joel's therapist was cut from the first season before production; Mazin reused the idea in the second season, considering therapy—invaluable in a world like The Last of Us's—an opportunity to discover what people are hiding. Joel's conversation with Gail in the episode is similar to his confession to Tommy in the game; while the latter served partly as a recap for the first game's events, the former demonstrates the impacts of Joel's lie, and Druckmann felt the change was justified by how it impacts the narrative later. Other scenes were also adapted in different ways, such as Ellie and Tommy hunting infected. In the dance scene, the writers found it important to consider the state of LGBTQ rights in 2003 and demonstrate "the way things were" through Seth's homophobia.

=== Casting and characters ===
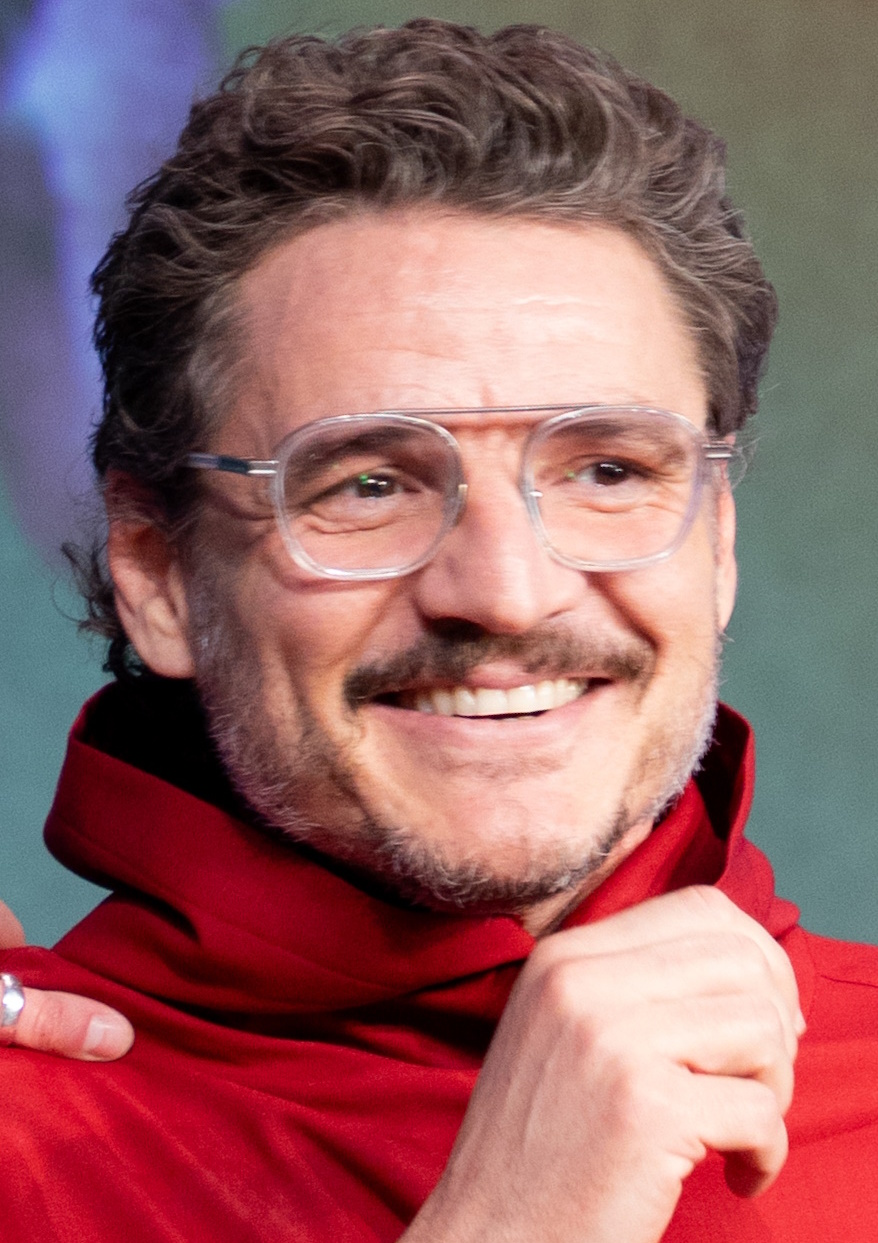
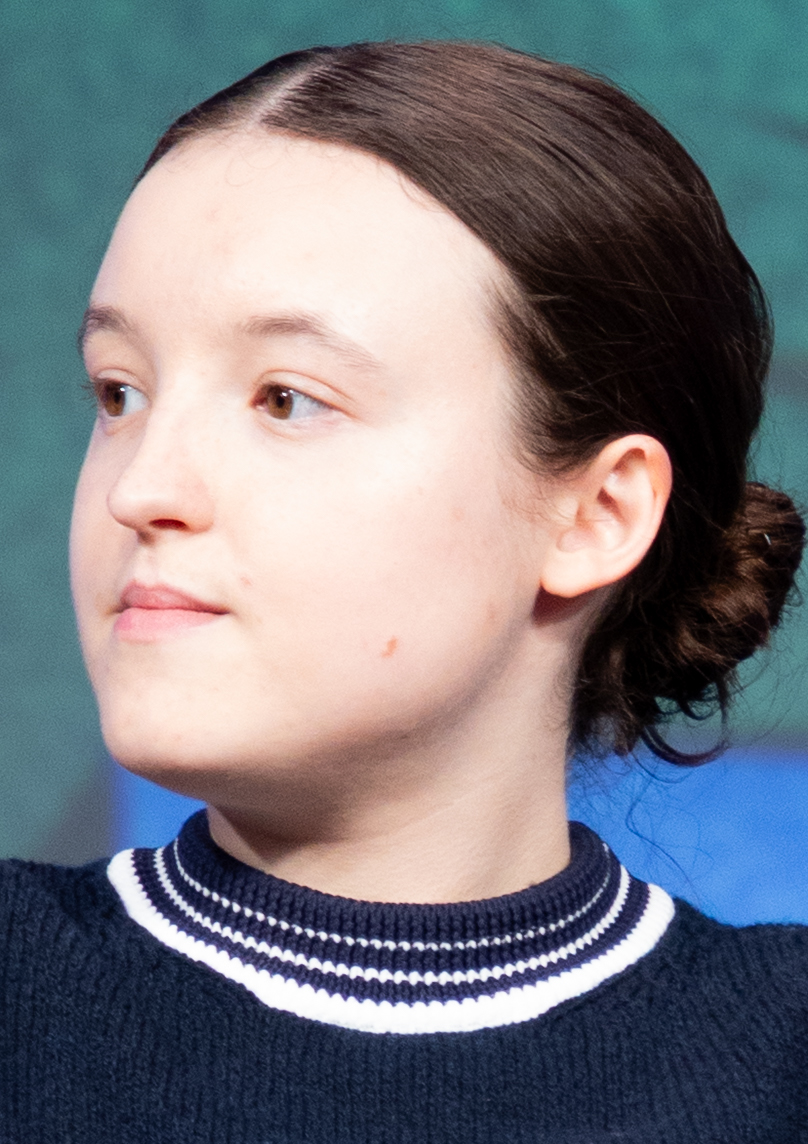
Pedro Pascal and Bella Ramsey considered the separation of their characters Joel and Ellie "painful" and "lonelier" while filming the second season.

Pedro Pascal and Bella Ramsey, who grew close during production of the first season, considered the separation of their characters Joel and Ellie "painful" and "lonelier" during filming for the second, though Pascal considered it "a very relatable fissure in relationships between parent and child". Pascal was forced to become vulnerable because of Joel's "stubborn paralysis" fueled by fear of losing Ellie, which helped the actor address exhaustion in his own life. Mazin found Ellie's combat encounters more interesting due to Ramsey's size, exploring techniques used by shorter people against larger enemies, such as Brazilian jiu-jitsu. Ramsey trained in jiu-jitsu for two months before filming; they found the stunts enjoyable but exhausting. Ramsey, though typically comfortable with stunts, was nervous about falling through the supermarket floor as it was filmed late in the day and involved several technical elements. Mazin felt he had witnessed the growth in Ramsey's personality and emotional maturity between seasons, which is reflected in the series.

The season introduces several new characters and spends more time with them. Mazin felt the new actors "fit right in" due to the series's established reputation. Casting was put on hold due to the writers' strike in May 2023; actors auditioned with scenes from Part II due to lack of scripts. Abby was the first to be cast; Kaitlyn Dever became the frontrunner after the SAG-AFTRA actors' strike ended in November 2023, following the response to her performance in No One Will Save You (2023). Her casting was announced on January 9, 2024. Several changes were made to Abby's story in the series—such as her role as a Firefly being revealed in "Future Days" despite the information being withheld until much later in the game—as her playability in the game demanded different narrative revelations. Mazin considered it important to demonstrate the human impact of Joel's actions, and Dever found the change allowed viewers to understand Abby's rage in a more limited time. Mazin compared Abby's grief and rage to Joel's emotions after his daughter's death in the first season. A spider bite on Dever's face was digitally removed in the Salt Lake City scene, costing thousands of dollars per shot; it was covered by insurance.

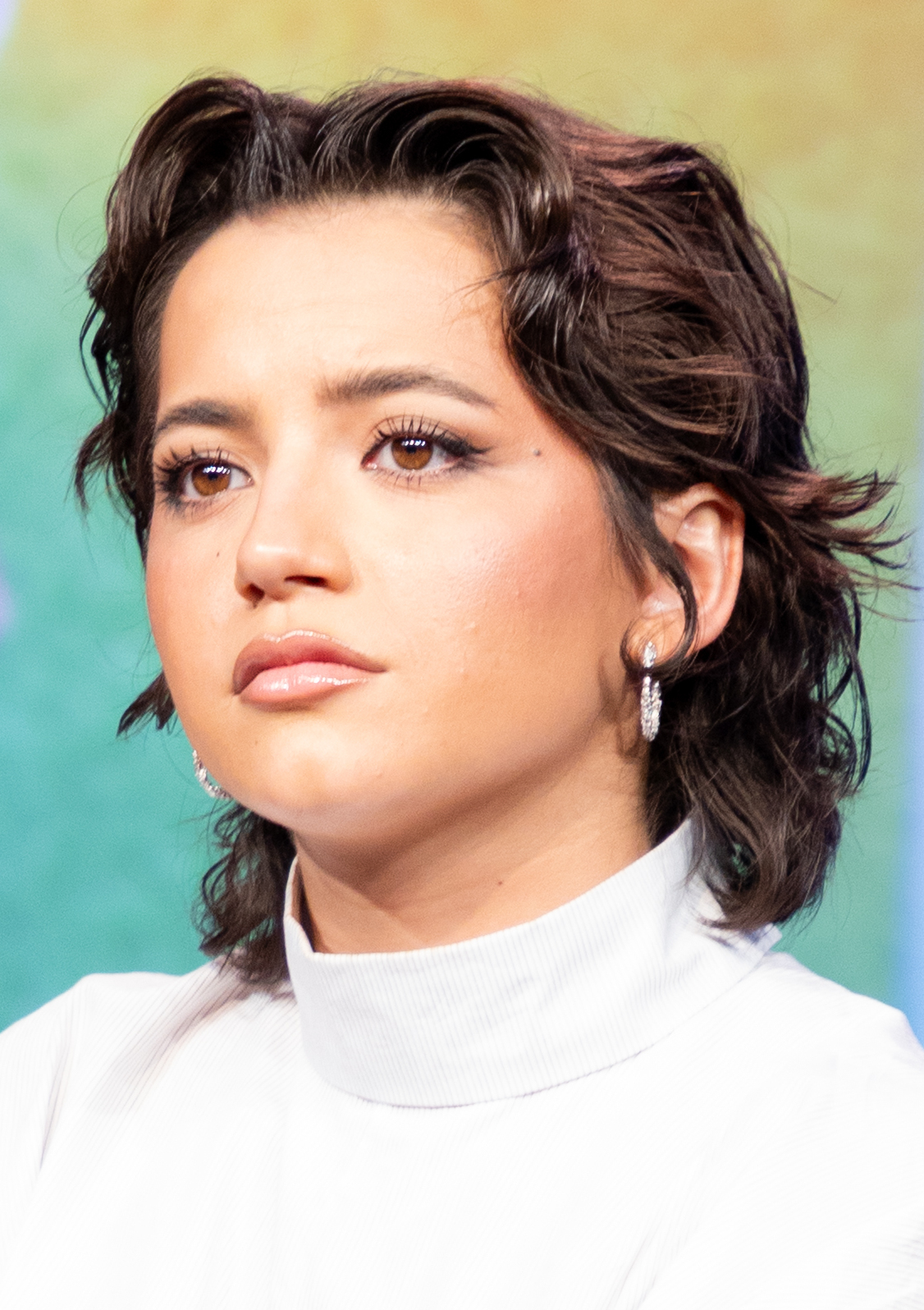
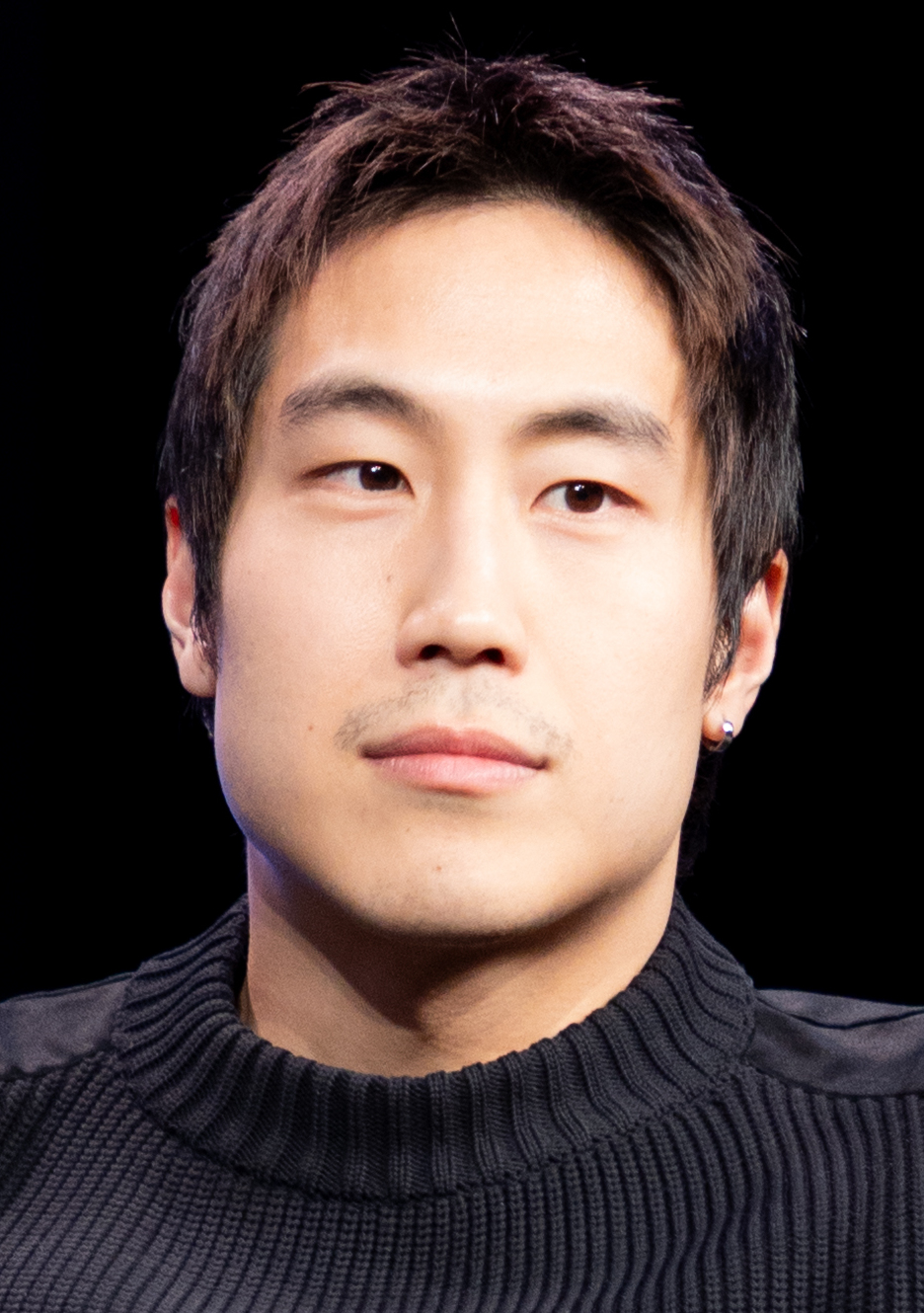
"Future Days" introduces Isabela Merced and Young Mazino as lead characters Dina and Jesse.

Young Mazino's casting as Jesse was announced on January 10, 2024, followed by Isabela Merced's as Dina on January 11. Mazino felt his dynamic with Merced reflected Jesse's with Dina: envious of her bubbly personality but too burdened by responsibility to reciprocate. Dina's relationship with Joel is discussed but unseen in the game; the writers felt the series provided an opportunity to show it. Mazin found it reflected real relationships wherein a parent is often appreciated more by their child's friends. Merced found Joel a "fun uncle" figure to Dina, noting their mutual confidence was natural considering their love for Ellie. Merced considered Dina the intelligence to Ellie's strength. She and Ramsey improvised some elements, such as Ellie and Dina's hand signs, which Merced thought reflected their playful dynamic; Mazin was reassured that the actors were comfortable together. Mazino and Merced took Santaolalla's instrument during filming to play, unaware it was his as he had not yet arrived.

Rumors in January 2024 claimed Catherine O'Hara had been cast as Gail; her casting was announced on February 2, and her character's name was revealed in February 2025. Mazin felt O'Hara—a traditionally comedic actor—was suitable for the dramatic role due to her depth, inspired by Vince Gilligan's work on Breaking Bad and Better Call Saul, such as casting Bryan Cranston as Walter White. O'Hara sought to bring dark humor to the role. She watched the first season after being introduced through her sons, who played the games; one works on the series as a set dresser. Though Gail drinks alcohol, O'Hara avoided "playing drunk" as she wanted to relate to the character. She requested that Gail drink out of a cup, based on a childhood memory of a neighbor who did the same with whiskey. The casting of Danny Ramirez, Ariela Barer, Tati Gabrielle, and Spencer Lord as Manny, Mel, Nora, and Owen, respectively, was announced on March 1, 2024, followed by Robert John Burke and Noah Lamanna's as Seth and Kat on March 5, 2025.

=== Music ===
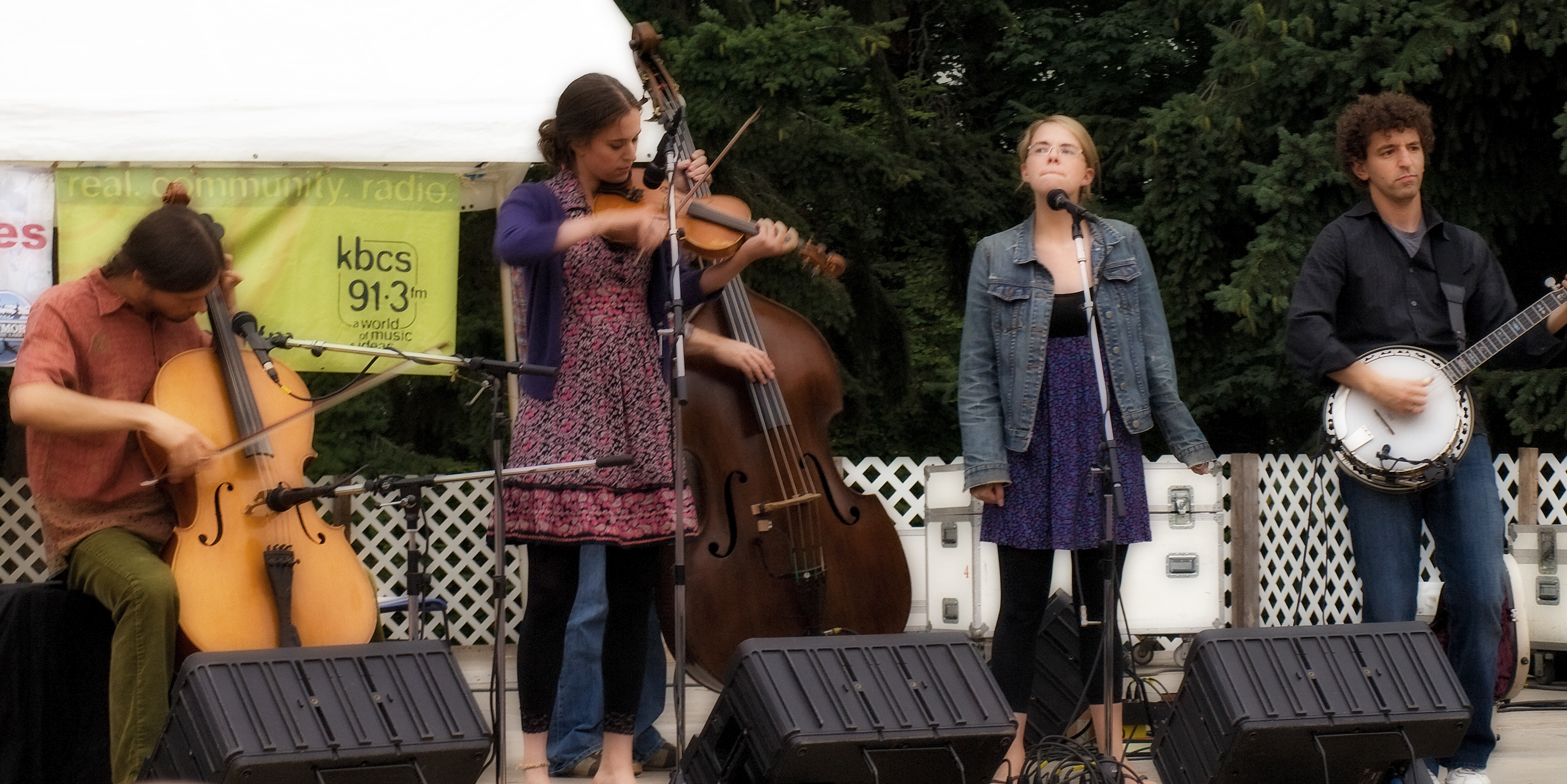
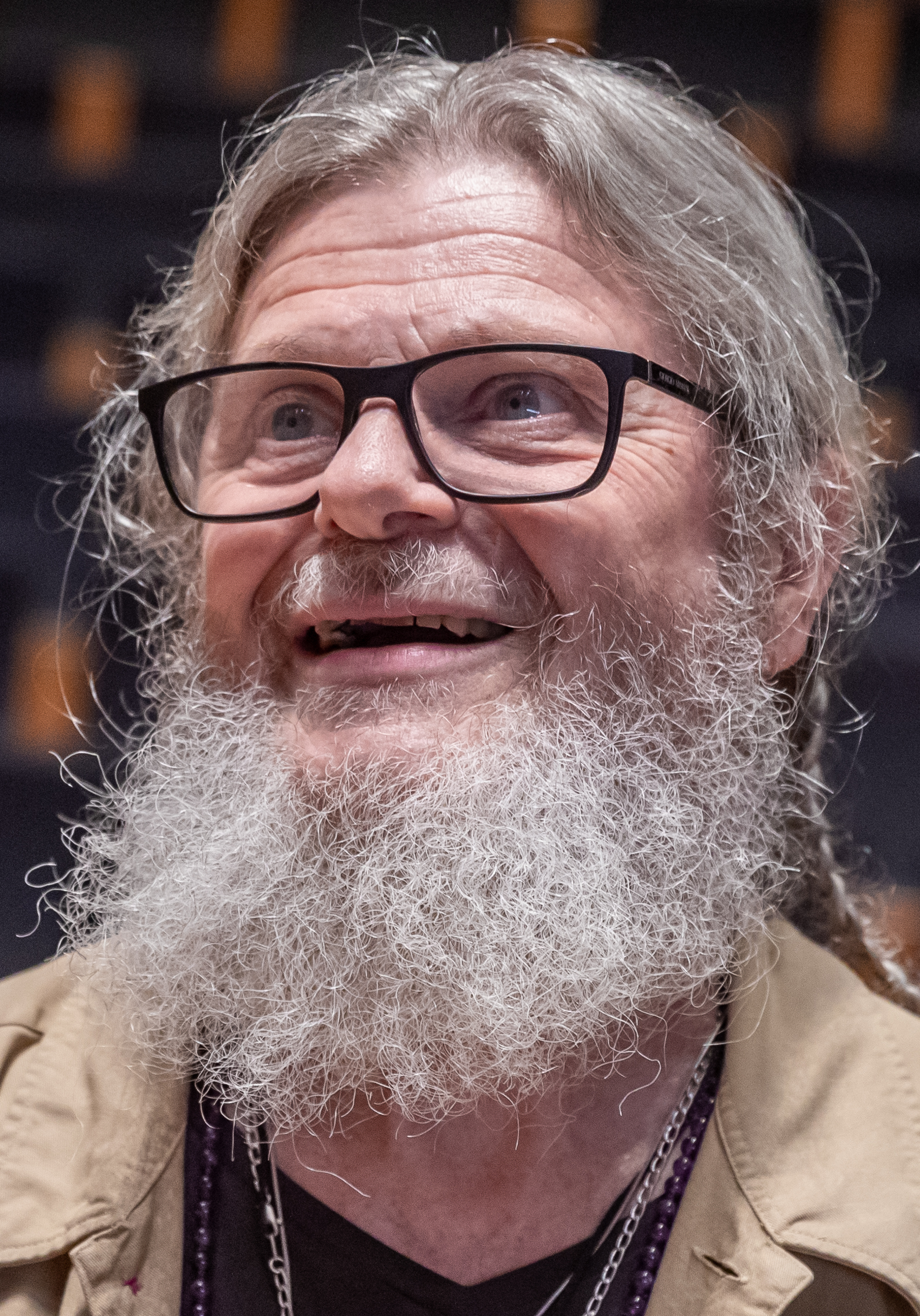
Crooked Still (left) and Gustavo Santaolalla (right) have a cameo appearance in the episode playing the former's songs.

The band Crooked Still appear in the dance scene as the fictional band Brittany and the Jug Boys, playing their own music which featured in the game: "Little Sadie" and "Ecstasy". Druckmann had wanted a band to appear in the game but was limited by time and development constraints. The band had been inactive for a few years, with some no longer making music, but the core group "jumped at the chance" to appear in the episode. Gustavo Santaolalla, who composes the music for the series and games, also has a cameo appearance—a reference to his cameo in the game—playing music alongside Crooked Still, with whom he only briefly spoke before filming despite never having played their songs before. Crooked Still provided the music supervisors with the tracks' stems, to which Santaolalla added instruments: his signature ronroco on "Little Sadie" and a guitar on "Ecstasy". The combined masters were featured on the season's soundtrack album. Ellie listens to Nirvana's "Love Buzz" in her room. Seeking to build upon the series's existing musical palette, co-composer David Fleming scored the stalker scene using an Appalachian dulcimer, which he had never used, likening it to a "vocal moan" which he immediately associated with the creature.

=== Filming ===
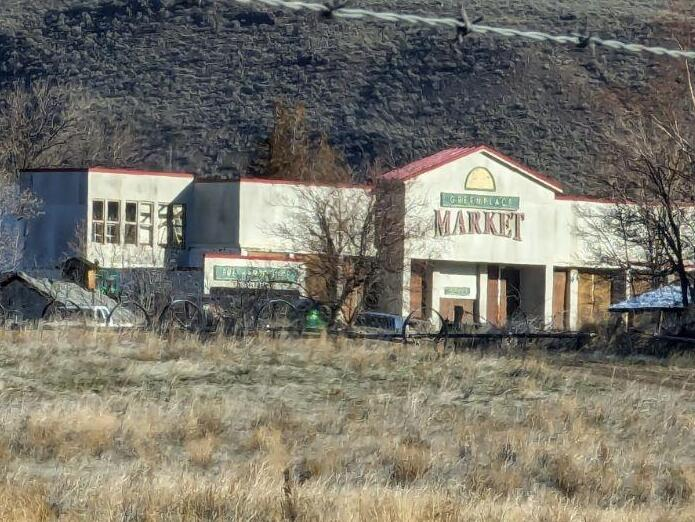
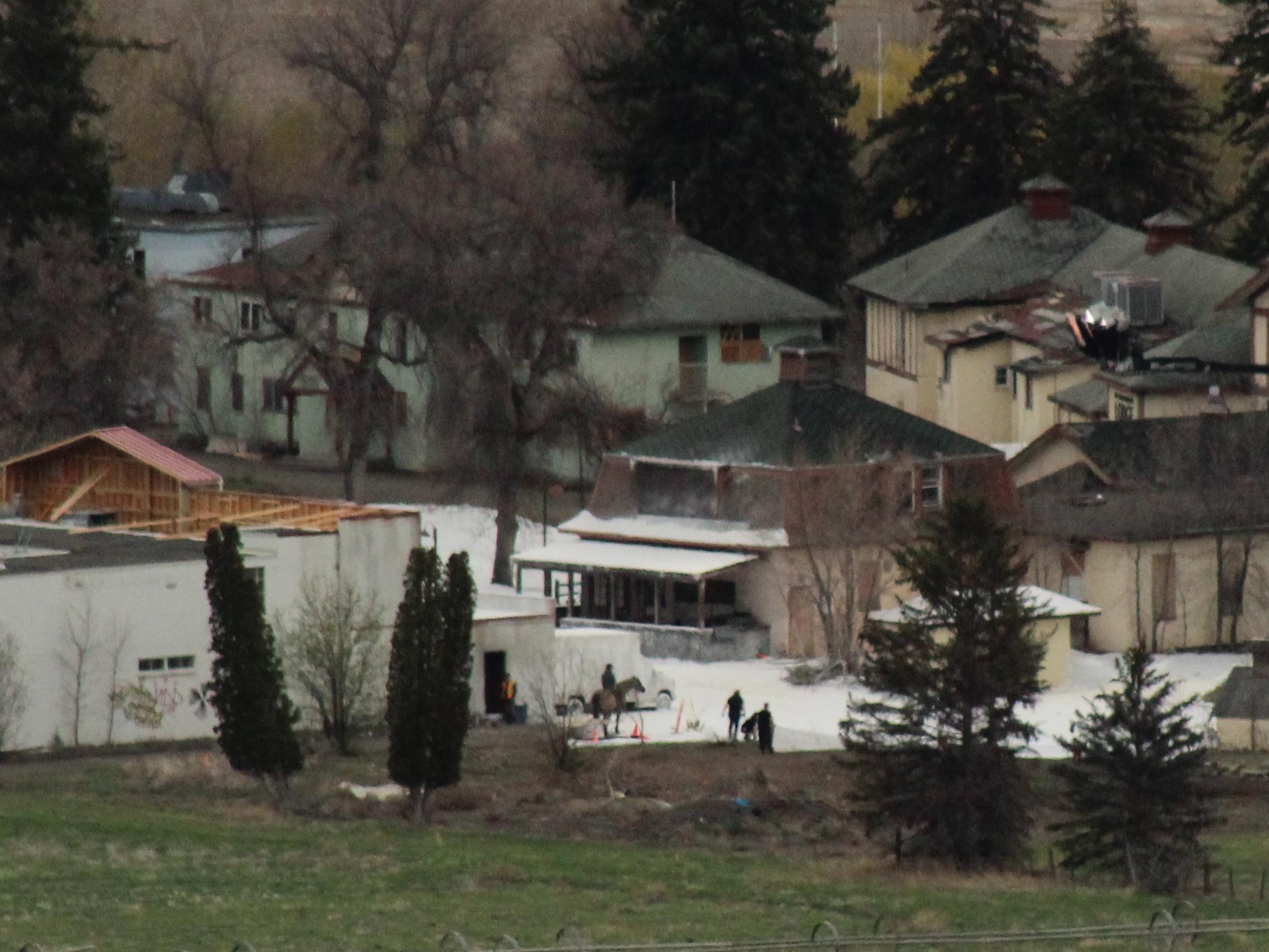
Filming took place in Kamloops in February 2024, with a set replicating the Greenplace Market.

Delayed by the writers' and actors' strikes, principal photography for the season began with "Future Days" on February 12, 2024, running under the working title Mega Sword. Ksenia Sereda, who returned as the season's lead director of photography, worked on the episode, setting the tone for the season. The first day of production involved Ramsey and Merced—the scene wherein Dina picks up Ellie for patrol—and Mazin felt their chemistry immediately. A building in Kamloops was dressed to replicate the Greenplace Market in February. Production took place in Calgary, Alberta—where the first season was partly filmed—on March 5–6, before moving to Mission, Fort Langley, and Langley, replicating Jackson. The episode neared completion by March 12.

Production returned to Alberta for ten days from March 18, with filming in Exshaw and along Highway 1A from March 21–24 requiring snow and a 72-hour partial highway closure; the production company donated CA$5,000 to the Municipal District of Bighorn to fund community projects. The town of Jackson was built on a private property in Minaty Bay, Britannia Beach; the original designs were much larger but limited by budgetary constraints. The actors' green rooms were in storefronts built by the construction teams, who had full access to the concept arts from the games. The town's wall was built with real lumber and trees, and each gate weighed around 1,800 pounds (820 kg). It was approved by engineers to ensure the safety of those atop it. Sereda appreciated the freedom provided by the set, specifically for lighting scenes. Distillery VFX designed the digital version of Jackson for visual effects. Close-up shots of the giraffes were filmed at Greater Vancouver Zoo, which DNEG used as reference when creating the wide shots using entirely computer-generated imagery to allow more flexibility.

The dance scenes were filmed at St. Clement's Anglican Church in Lynn Valley. According to the church's rector, the Reverend Helen Dunn, the location scout was concerned that the church would object to the scene due to the gay kiss; Dunn reassured them that she herself was gay. The parish council was enthusiastic about the production as many members were fans of the series; one particularly enjoyed the first-season episode "Long, Long Time", which she called "the most beautiful episode of television I've ever seen". Several church members supervised the use of the building, and the production crew compensated the community: they constructed a dance floor at a local tennis court for a church dance group, sent a guitar ministry group on a field trip, and offered to pay the rental costs to each group who typically occupied the church. The overhead lighting was maintained during a Sunday service. Dunn was proud that the church participated in an LGBTQ storyline for the series.

The shot of Ellie at the beginning of the dance was replicated from the game as Mazin considered it important; he felt it showed both the similarities and differences of the series. Sereda initially tried filming it on a crane; when Mazin was unsatisfied with the shot, Sereda filmed it handheld instead, which Mazin considered perfect. Druckmann found the shot emotional as he felt it demonstrated the love and passion of the production crew—especially Mazin and Sereda—for the source material. Sereda lowered the camera as the scene progresses to show the lights and create a magical feeling reflecting the characters falling in love. The therapy sequence was filmed over a full day, which O'Hara found "intense". It was filmed to slowly build as the characters approach the truth, with increasingly closer shots and longer lenses to focus on their eyelines; the final close-up of Joel is a reference to The Silence of the Lambs (1991). Pascal requested that Joel stand when delivering the final line; Mazin was concerned about the logistics of the shot but found it effective, especially as O'Hara reacted by flinching. Sereda used specific camera movements and positions to build tension in the stalker sequence. She opted for a handheld style and longer shots to maintain a deeper and more real connection to the characters. The scene was lit using a SkyPanel S360, which Sereda felt added a suitable glow.

=== Post-production ===
"Future Days" was edited by Timothy A. Good and Emily Mendez, who worked on the first season. Mendez, a fan of the games, worked with Mazin to approach scenes from the perspective of fans while Good, who has not played the games, approached from a general viewpoint. Good ensured scenes focused on Abby making decisions to allow audiences to understand her perspective despite her antagonistic actions. Mazin gave specific instructions for some scenes, such as showing Gail's assertiveness and nuance. The scene is specifically edited to remain unbalanced, showing a close-up of Gail to demonstrate her power over Joel; it is only matched with a close-up of Joel when he begins to speak and equalizes the power. Mendez edited the stalker sequence.

== Reception ==
=== Broadcast and ratings ===
In December 2023, HBO announced the season was set to premiere on its television network and the streaming service Max in 2025; Casey Bloys, the chairman and chief executive officer of HBO and Max, said it would air during the eligibility window for the following Emmy Awards. Druckmann announced the season's April premiere window as part of Sony's Consumer Electronics Show presentation in January 2025; the following month, HBO announced the April 13 date. The first episode received its red carpet world premiere at the TCL Chinese Theatre in Los Angeles on March 24, followed by a red carpet and theater screening at the State Theatre in Sydney on April 2, Grand Rex in Paris on April 5, and Vue West End in Leicester Square, London, on April 10. An influencer pre-screening took place at the Domino Sugar Refinery in Brooklyn.

Viewership for the first season surged by 150% in the week preceding "Future Days", becoming the fourth-most-viewed program across all streaming platforms. The episode aired on HBO on April 13; an American Sign Language version, performed by Daniel Durant and directed by Leila Hanaumi, was released on Max simultaneously. "Future Days" had 5.3 million viewers in the United States on its first night, including linear viewers and streams on Max—a 13% increase from the first-season premiere. Within a few hours of the episode's release, the season was the sixth-most-viewed across all streaming services for the week; On linear television, the episode had 938,000 viewers, with a 0.31 ratings share.

=== Critical response ===
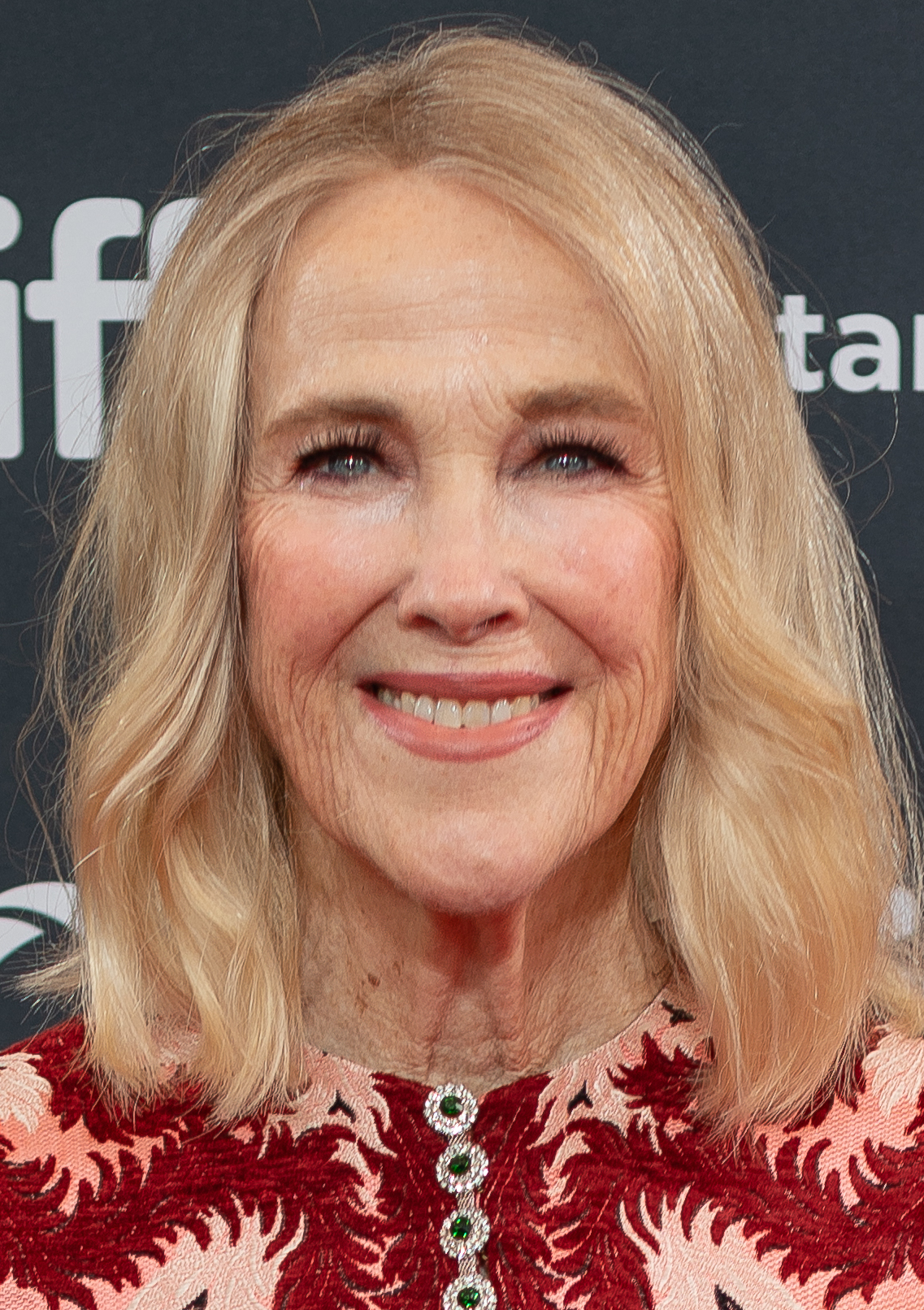
Critics praised Catherine O'Hara's performance for portraying vulnerability underlying her placidity.

"Future Days" has an approval rating of 97% on review aggregator Rotten Tomatoes based on 31 reviews, with an average rating of 8.7 out of 10. The website's critical consensus reads "Pedro Pascal and Bella Ramsey once again prove to be an unyielding life-force in ... the Season 2 opener which lights an unshakable fire". Critics considered it a strong opening chapter which largely serves to establish the remainder of the season, and USA Today's Kelly Lawler found the opening episodes' engaging pace reminiscent of the first season. IGN's Simon Cardy lauded Mazin's direction, which Engadget's Nathan Ingraham considered a nice tribute to the game, particularly in the party scene's opening shot. CBR's Katie Doll considered the wide shots of Jackson "a love letter" to the team who created it, praising Mazin and Sereda's focus on its scope.

Critics praised Pascal and Ramsey's performances and wanted more shared scenes between them. Ramsey's portrayal of Ellie was commended for their charm, though Kotaku's Kenneth Shepard felt unconvinced that they embodied the five-year time jump. Pascal was lauded for his subtle nuance in portraying Joel's frustration and sadness, particularly in his scene with O'Hara, which The A.V. Club's Caroline Siede considered "perhaps Pascal's finest acting work to date". TechRadar's Tom Power felt "each new actor fits their character like a glove". Reviewers enjoyed O'Hara's portrayal of vulnerability and mania underlying her placidity, and Vulture's Keith Phipps enjoyed her dramatic performance in light of her comedic work on The Studio airing simultaneously; she was nominated for Guest Actress in a Drama Series at the 77th Primetime Creative Arts Emmy Awards. Dever's performance was praised for her emotionality and ferocity despite her brief appearance, and Mazino and Merced's work was commended; Esquire's Brady Langmann felt the latter "bursts from the screen" and considered her the standout.

Several reviewers appreciated the homages to and changes from the game's narrative, which Push Square's Aaron Bayne wrote "is what we're looking for in an adaptation", though IGN's Cardy questioned some changes, preferring Abby's backstory and the dance sequence to be withheld until later in the narrative, as in the game. Kotaku's Shepard similarly found Abby's motivations benefited from mystery and tension, rather than outwardly revealing her thoughts as in the episode. Screen Rant's Mary Kassel felt the episode had some "heavy exposition" but considered it necessary to establish the story. Critics lauded the suspense of the stalker scene, which The A.V. Club's Siede favorably compared it to a horror movie due to the performer's movements, and the quiet tension of Joel's therapy session, which IGN's Cardy felt "displays the shared grief of everyone in this world wonderfully". Kotaku's Shepard called the dance sequence "a perfect fucking scene" left largely unchanged, including the meticulously crafted dialogue. The episode was submitted for Music Composition for a Series (Original Dramatic Score), Stunt Coordination, and Stunt Performance at the Emmy Awards.
