= Beverly Whipple =

American sexologist (1941–2026)

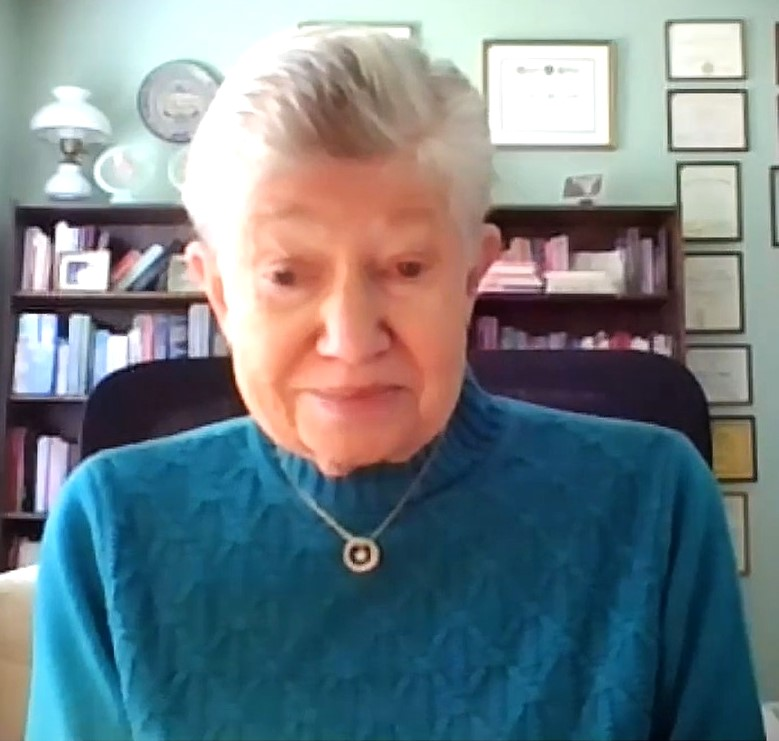
- Whipple in 2021
- Born: Beverly Hoehne; June 30, 1941; Jersey City, New Jersey, U.S.
- Died: November 2, 2026 (aged 85); Voorhees Township, New Jersey, U.S.
- Education: Wagner College
- Occupations: Sexologist; author; academic; professor

Beverly Whipple (née Hoehne; June 30, 1941 – November 2, 2026) was an American sexologist, author and academic, who was a professor at Rutgers University-New Brunswick. She was a co-author of the publication The G Spot and Other Recent Discoveries About Human Sexuality (1982).

== Early years and education ==
Whipple was born Beverly Hoehne in Jersey City, New Jersey, on June 30, 1941, grew up in Secaucus, New Jersey, and graduated from Weehawken High School. She received a bachelor's degree in nursing from Wagner College in New York City and was a member of the Zeta Tau Alpha fraternity. After her graduation, in 1962, she married Jim Whipple. She later earned a master's degree in counseling, a master's in nursing, and a doctorate in psychobiology, all from Rutgers University.

== Career ==
Following a career in nursing, much of her academic work has been concerned with the enhancement of female sexual function. In 1981, she was co-author of Frank Addiego et al., "Female ejaculation: a case study". The paper was presented in The Journal of Sex Research and includes the first published instance of the term "G-spot". She was an elected Fellow of the Society for the Scientific Study of Sexuality.

== Publications ==
Following the book, Whipple continued to publicize her work, including a 9 min video made in 1981 Orgasmic Expulsions of Fluid in the Sexually Stimulated Female. In 1984, the Journal of Sex Research described the debate surrounding female ejaculation as "heated".

Whipple was a co-author of the paper "Who's afraid of the G-spot?" This was a review by six scientists who looked at the available literature to evaluate the evidence for or against the existence of the G-spot. It was published in the Journal of Sexual Medicine and concluded that more research was required.

Her techniques included using fMRI scans to gather evidence on what was happening in the brain. Her animal experiments contributed to the isolation of the vasoactive intestinal peptide and the discovery that orgasms can be rerouted to the brain via the vagus nerve without using the spinal cord, thus enabling females with spinal cord injury to achieve orgasm by psychological stimulation alone.

== Death ==
Whipple died at her home in Voorhees Township, New Jersey, on November 2, 2026, from complications of what was assessed as "an illness consistent with Alzheimer's disease". She was 85.

== Books ==
The following is a list of books that have been written or co-written by Whipple.

- Khan Ladas, Alice; Whipple, Beverly; Perry, John (1982). The G Spot: And Other Recent Discoveries About Human Sexuality. Holt & Company. ISBN 9780030618314.
- Whipple, Beverly; Ogden, Gina (1988). Safe Encounters: How Women Can Say Yes to Pleasure and No to Unsafe Sex. McGraw Hill Education. ISBN 9780070695191.
- Khan Ladas, Alice; Whipple, Beverly (2000). Smart Women, Strong Bones. LIFESTYLES Four Heart Press. ISBN 9781878319029.
- Gates, Ronda; Whipple, Beverly (2003). Outwitting Osteoporosis: The Smart Woman's Guide To Bone Health. Atria Books/Beyond Words. ISBN 9781582700991.
- Khan Ladas, Alice; Whipple, Beverly (2005). The G Spot: And Other Discoveries About Human Sexuality. Macmillan. ISBN 9780805077599.
- Komisaruk, Barry; Beyer-Flores, Carlos; Whipple, Beverly (2006). The Science of Orgasm. Johns Hopkins University Press. ISBN 9780801884900.
- Komisaruk, Barry; Whipple, Beverly; Nasserzadeh, Sara; Beyer-Flores, Carlos (2009). The Orgasm Answer Guide. Johns Hopkins University Press. ISBN 9780801893964.
