= Is the Alabama Boys Choir =

EP by Verbena
- Released: 2003
- Genre: Alternative rock
- Length: 18:51
- Label: Capitol
- Producer: Rob Schnapf (tracks 1–4); Ed Buller and Verbena (tracks 5–6)

Verbena chronology
Into the Pink (1999)	Is the Alabama Boys Choir (2003)	La Musica Negra (2003)

Is the Alabama Boys Choir is a promotional EP recording by Verbena released in 2003 on Capitol Records. Tracks 1 and 2 were from the then forthcoming album, La Musica Negra, while tracks 3 through 6 were all previously unreleased and can only be found on this release.

== Track listing ==
All songs written by Scott Bondy.

1. "Killing Floor (Get Down on It)" – 3:01
2. "All the Saints" – 3:19
3. "Six White Horses" – 3:51
4. "Dr. Strangelove" – 2:03
5. "Criminals and Beauty Queens" – 4:55
6. "The List" – 1:40

== Personnel ==
- Scott Bondy – vocals and guitar
- Anne Marie Griffin – guitar and vocals
- Nick Daviston – bass
- Les Nuby – drums

=== Production ===
- Producer: Rob Schnapf, Ed Buller and Verbena
- Engineer: Doug Boehm, Kent Matcke, Chris Manning and Damian Shannon
- Mixing: Rob Schnapf, Doug Boehm and Ed Buller
