= Verbena (band) =

American rock band (1994–2003)

- Also known as: The Alabama Boys Choir, Shallow, Volume
- Origin: Birmingham, Alabama, U.S.
- Genres: Southern rock; post-grunge; indie rock; alternative rock
- Years active: 1994–2003
- Labels: Capitol, Setanta, Merge
- Past members: Scott Bondy; Les Nuby; Anne Marie Griffin; Nick Daviston; Duquette Johnston; Louis Schefano; Ben Dunn; Carson Lamm; Mikey Welsh

Verbena was an American rock band from Birmingham, Alabama, founded in the early 1990s by Scott Bondy, Anne Marie Griffin, Les Nuby, and Daniel Johnston. They released three albums, one of which was issued on Merge Records and two of which were issued on Capitol Records.

== History ==
The band was founded in the early 1990s by high school friends Scott Bondy (vocals, guitar) Les Nuby (guitar), Daniel (changed to "Duquette" post-Verbena) Johnston (bass) and Carson Lamm (drums) with the name Volume.

Anne Marie Griffin (additional vocals, guitar) replaced Nuby and the band Volume was renamed Shallow. Eventually, drummer Carson Lamm quit Shallow to play with the band Fuzzy Sons, and the original Remy Zero drummer Louis Schefano joined Shallow. Shallow released the songs "Lot" and "Always and Forever" on the compilation album Balkanize Now. Soon after, Nuby rejoined the group as drummer (replacing Schefano) and the band recorded a handful of singles and an EP for Merge Records under the name Verbena.

Following their first full-length, Souls For Sale (1997), produced by Dave Fridmann and released on Setanta Records in the UK and Merge Records in the US, the band attracted attention from Dave Grohl, who agreed to produce its major-label debut, Into The Pink (1999), for Capitol Records. Before recording, Johnston left the band and Griffin took over bass duties after a short live stint with Grohl playing bass. The album's single, "Baby Got Shot," received moderate modern rock radio airplay, and its music video landed in rotation on MTV2 mid-year. While touring in support of Into The Pink, former Weezer bassist Mikey Welsh was recruited to provide bass duties with Griffin back on rhythm guitar. Shortly afterwards, Griffin left the band and was replaced with bassist Nick Daviston. Verbena continued as a trio and released La Musica Negra (2003), produced by Rob Schnapf, and again garnered airplay for the single "Way Out West" with a music video that featured Kiefer Sutherland and Natasha Lyonne. They toured in support of La Musica Negra, sometimes under the name The Alabama Boys Choir. Verbena disbanded in 2003.

=== Current projects ===
In the fall of 2005, Bondy and Nuby each started respective solo projects. Nuby had a brief stint in Amy Ray's backing band, The Volunteers, as second guitarist throughout her Prom tour, and is currently the guitarist for Vulture Whale. In September 2007, Bondy released his solo debut, American Hearts, under the name A.A. Bondy on Superphonic Records; it was re-released by Fat Possum Records the following year. Bondy released his second solo effort, When The Devil's Loose, in 2009. Duquette Johnson toured as Cutgrass for years and played bass on tour with a reunited Blake Babies. Duquette Johnson and the Rebel Kings released several albums on the Superphonic Label, including Etowah. Les Nuby is currently Producer/Engineer/Musician at Ol Elegante Studio in Birmingham, Alabama. Bondy returned in 2011 with Believers via Fat Possum Records. He did not release another record for nearly a decade until 2019 when Fat Possum Records put out his latest entitled, Enderness.

== Discography ==
=== Albums ===
- Souls for Sale (1997)
- Into the Pink (1999)
- La Musica Negra (2003)

=== EPs ===
- Pilot Park (1996)
- Is the Alabama Boys Choir (2003)

=== Singles ===
- "Everyday Shoes" (1995)
- "I Say So" (1995)
- "Hey, Come On" (1997)
- "Shaped Like a Gun" (1997)
- "Pretty Please" (1999)
- "Baby Got Shot" (1999)
- "Way Out West" (2003)
- "Top of the Mountain" (2003) - split single with Grandaddy
