= Music of The Last of Us Part II =

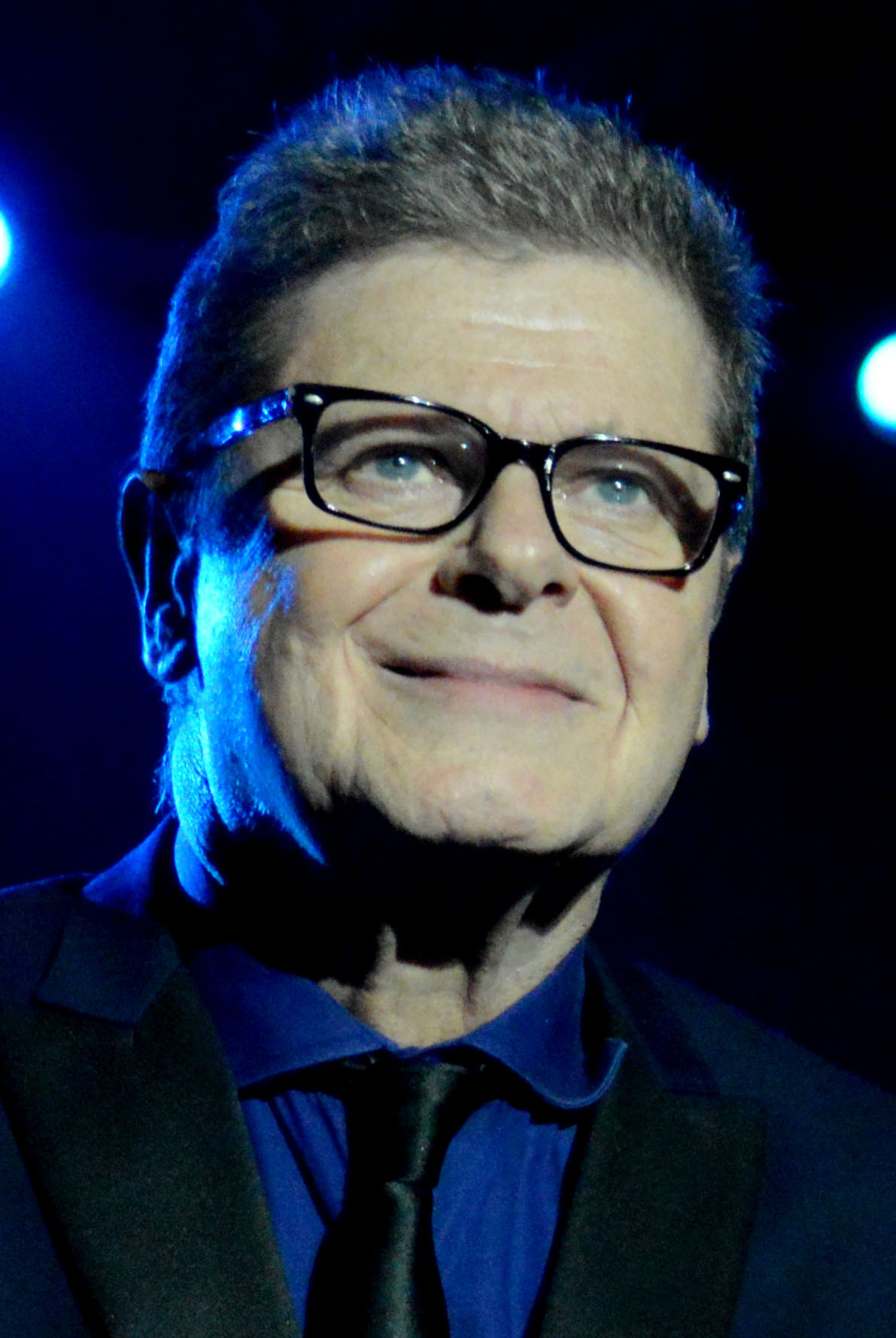
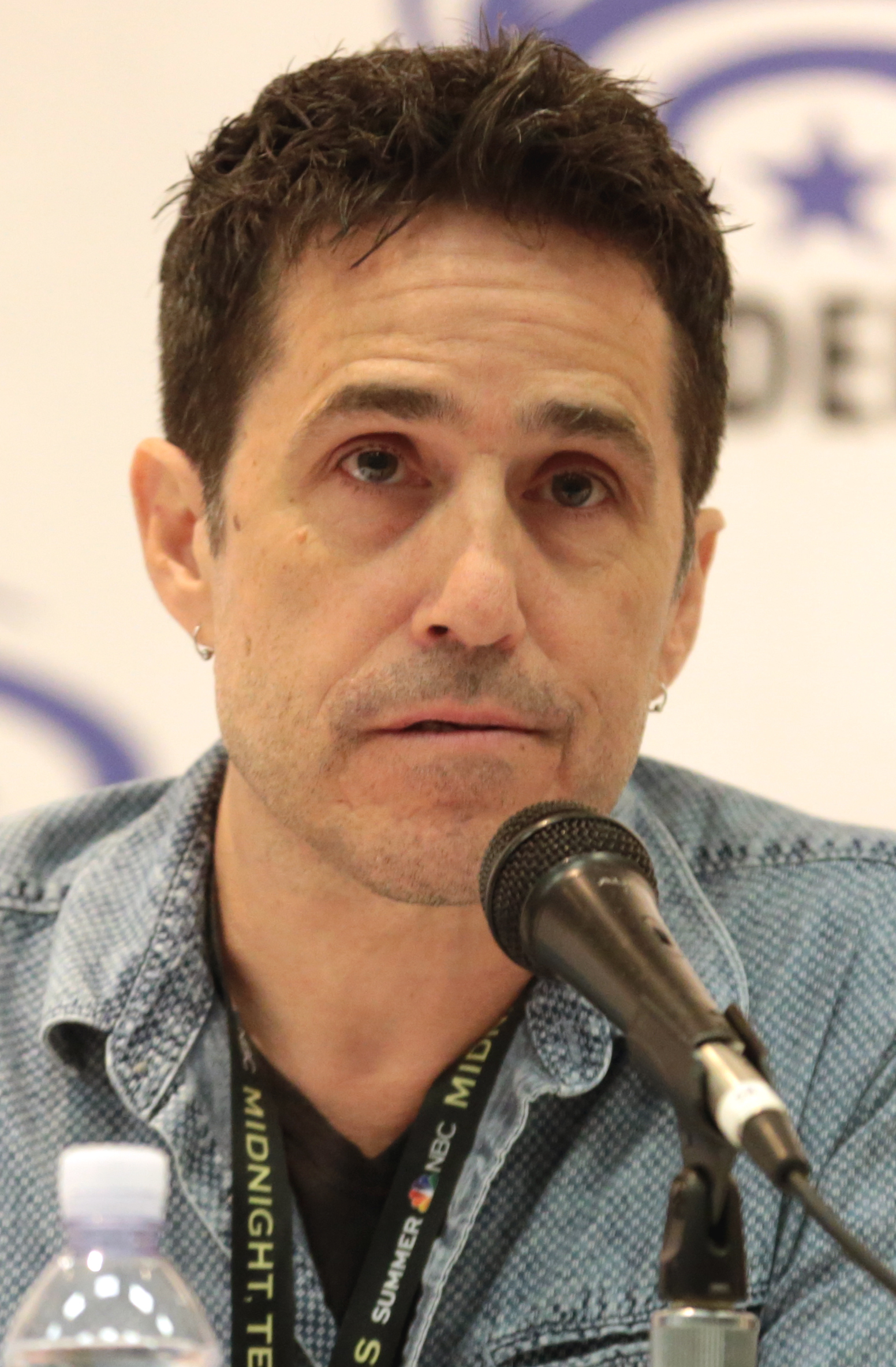
Gustavo Santaolalla (left) returned to compose the score for The Last of Us Part II, while Mac Quayle (right) provided additional combat music.

The music for the 2020 action-adventure survival horror video game The Last of Us Part II, developed by Naughty Dog and published by Sony Interactive Entertainment, was composed by musician Gustavo Santaolalla, with additional music composed by Mac Quayle. The original score album was released digitally alongside the game in June 2020, featuring the work of Santaolalla and Quayle. An additional extended play, Covers and Rarities, was released in September 2021, featuring five cover songs from the game and its marketing performed by Troy Baker and Ashley Johnson, who portrayed Joel and Ellie, respectively. The game also received two single releases as vinyl records: one in June 2018 featuring music from the trailers, and one in the Ellie Edition of the game in June 2020.

Santaolalla had previously composed the music for The Last of Us (2013). He created music based on the story pitch by creative director Neil Druckmann, and his work often inspired Druckmann to write new scenes. Santaolalla used his signature instrument, the ronroco, to represent Ellie, and the banjo for Abby. The game is themed around the banjo and an electric guitar. While Santaolalla was tasked with creating the emotional, character-based tracks, Quayle composed the combat music. He was hired in 2018 due to his work on the television series Mr. Robot, and aimed to create a suspenseful sound to keep the action moving and reflect the anxiety-inducing gameplay.

The development team received permission to create cover versions of several songs from artists such as Pearl Jam, Shawn James, and A-ha. The covers became a significant part of the characters and their development; Ellie's guitar allows her to access memories and emotions, and Pearl Jam's song "Future Days" acts as a theme between her and Joel throughout the game. Critical reception to the music was positive, as reviewers felt that it connected appropriately with the narrative and added tension to the gameplay. It was nominated for numerous awards.

== Production and composition ==
Gustavo Santaolalla returned to compose and perform the score for The Last of Us Part II, as he had done with the first game. Naughty Dog tasked him to create emotional, character-based tracks, and he worked on the game for two to three years. He created music based on the story pitch by creative director Neil Druckmann and they fit the music into the scenes later, occasionally requiring minor rewrites. Santaolalla delivered small parts over time, often inspiring Druckmann to write new scenes. With the game still in development, Santaolalla worked with the story, characters, and artwork to craft the score, though he was familiar with "the visual language" after the first game. He wanted to maintain and extend the first game's motifs while introducing new elements. He felt his approach in composing had not changed as the themes of love (continued from the first game) and hate (new to Part II) were linked: the latter a deformation of the former.

Santaolalla continued using the ronroco, his signature instrument used in the first game's theme, as he felt it enhanced Ellie's qualities through feminine sounds, while he introduced a banjo for Abby's theme. He composed Part II's score around the banjo and an electric guitar, feeling the increased characters and complexities demanded more timbre. The developers encouraged him to use the banjo despite his initial hesitance; he felt it reflected the game's American setting and origin and his spontaneous use imparted a "searching, reflective, pensive" feeling. Santaolalla wanted Joel's themes rendered acoustically in Part II, replacing the first game's Fender VI bass guitar with esoteric Argentine strings called "Magma", which maintained the Fender's darkness but emitted a more virile sound. For the orchestral parts, Santaolalla favored the bass clarinet for its five octave range and warm quality, akin to a flute. The music during Joel's death scene intended to build dread but feel inevitable, as opposed to the surprise and sadness invoked during Sarah's death in the first game. Druckmann wanted the music to convey narrative elements: after Abby collects the medicine to save Yara, the music symbolizes her redemption; when she later protects Lev, it represents their relationship.

Mac Quayle was hired in early 2018 to create the combat music. The developers were familiar with his work on the television series Mr. Robot. Quayle bought a PlayStation 4 and The Last of Us to familiarize himself with the series. He began writing ideas in May 2018 and delivered final music in January 2020; he found the deadlines more relaxed than film and television. Though they discussed potentially sharing stems and sessions, Santaolalla and Quayle's collaborations were minimal; they performed a three-day recording session in PlayStation's offices in October 2018, experimenting to create "grooves and textures". Quayle attributed their similarities to the developers "really knowing what they wanted". Quayle's music aimed to represent the gameplay's "relentless tension", consistently moving the action forward and heightening suspense and anxiety. Quayle was provided with videos of early gameplay for inspiration. He used Logic Pro to manipulate the live acoustic instruments, of which his favorite were the bass guitar and cello; he brought in a professional cellist for the latter.

== Albums ==
=== Music from The Last of Us Part II ===
Music from The Last of Us Part II

Soundtrack album by Crooked Still and Gustavo Santaolalla
- Released: June 12, 2018
- Genre: Soundtrack
- Length: 5:30
- Label: Sony Interactive Entertainment

Singles from Music from The Last of Us Part II
- 1. "The Last of Us (Cycles)" Released: September 27, 2018

Music from The Last of Us Part II is a single consisting of two songs from the game: "Little Sadie" performed by Crooked Still, and "The Last of Us (Cycles)" by Santaolalla. The vinyl record, mastered by James Plotkin, was released in June 2018 following the game's presentation at E3, which featured the song "Little Sadie". It was available to purchase in blue from Mondo, and in red at the PlayStation Gear Store at E3. "The Last of Us (Cycles)" was released digitally as an individual single on September 27, 2018.

Side A
No.	Title	Artist(s)	Length
1.	"Little Sadie"	Crooked Still	2:35

Side B
No.	Title	Writer(s)	Length
2.	"The Last of Us (Cycles)"	Gustavo Santaolalla	2:55
Total length:			5:30

=== Ellie Edition ===
Ellie Edition

Soundtrack album by Gustavo Santaolalla
- Released: June 19, 2020
- Genre: Soundtrack
- Length: 4:06
- Label: Sony Interactive Entertainment

A single featuring two songs from the game was released as a seven-inch vinyl record with the Ellie Edition of The Last of Us Part II on June 19, 2020, exclusive to the United States. The songs, composed and performed by Santaolalla, were also released in the Original Soundtrack under different titles.

Side A
No.	Title	Writer(s)	Length
1.	"The Purpose in Loss"	Gustavo Santaolalla	1:42

Side B
No.	Title	Writer(s)	Length
2.	"Desolation Road"	Santaolalla	2:24
Total length:			4:06

=== Original Soundtrack ===
The Last of Us Part II (Original Soundtrack)

Soundtrack album by Gustavo Santaolalla and Mac Quayle
- Released: June 19, 2020
- Genre: Soundtrack
- Length: 76:56
- Label: Sony Interactive Entertainment
- Producer: Gustavo Santaolalla; Aníbal Kerpel; Scott Hanau

The Last of Us Part II (Original Soundtrack) comprises songs from the game, composed and produced by Santaolalla. The soundtrack spans 28 tracks, covering a duration of 77 minutes. Sony Interactive Entertainment first published the album digitally on June 19, 2020. It was produced by Santaolalla, Aníbal Kerpel, and Scott Hanau, and mastered at Bernie Grundman Mastering by Patricia Sullivan. Vinyl record versions were released by Mondo on 5 February 2021 and by Milan Records on 26 February. The Mondo version cover was designed by Tula Lotay.

In the context of the game, the music received praise. IGN's Jonathon Dornbush lauded Santaolalla's "moving" score, and Andy McNamara of Game Informer found that the music added tension. Kevin Dunsmore of Hardcore Gamer wrote that the "haunting and subtle melodies blend into the world seamlessly". Eurogamer's Oli Welsh praised the score for its combination of banjo and electronics. The soundtrack was nominated for Best Physical Soundtrack Release at the 18th Annual Game Audio Network Guild Awards in April 2021.

The album ranked on the charts several times in Europe: August to September 2020, when it ranked 85 in Spain and 170 in Belgium and France; February to March 2021, ranking 11 in the United Kingdom, 62 in Belgium, 96 in Spain, and 193 in France; and January 2025, ranking 77 in Greece.

Side A
No.	Title	Writer(s)	Length
1.	"The Last of Us Part II"	Gustavo Santaolalla	2:52
2.	"Unbound"	Santaolalla	1:57
3.	"Longing"	Santaolalla	1:45
4.	"Eye for an Eye"	Mac Quayle	2:37
5.	"It Can't Last"	Santaolalla	2:19
6.	"The Cycle of Violence"	Quayle	5:04
7.	"Reclaimed Memories"	Santaolalla	1:42

Side B
No.	Title	Writer(s)	Length
8.	"Cordyceps"	Quayle	2:40
9.	"Longing (Redemptions)"	Santaolalla	1:42
10.	"Restless Spirits"	Santaolalla	2:12
11.	"Chasing a Rumor"	Santaolalla	2:54
12.	"They're Still Out There"	Quayle	3:32
13.	"Unbroken"	Santaolalla	4:38
14.	"The Rattlers"	Quayle	3:41

Side C
No.	Title	Writer(s)	Length
15.	"The Obsession"	Santaolalla	1:21
16.	"Soft Descent"	Santaolalla	1:50
17.	"The WLF"	Quayle	3:39
18.	"A Wolf's Ghost"	Santaolalla	2:24
19.	"Masks On"	Quayle	2:02
20.	"It Can't Last (Home)"	Santaolalla	4:29
21.	"Inextinguishable Flames"	Santaolalla	0:59

Side D
No.	Title	Writer(s)	Length
22.	"Allowed to be Happy"	Santaolalla	2:48
23.	"Collateral"	Santaolalla	2:22
24.	"The Cycle Continues"	Quayle	3:28
25.	"All Gone (The Promise)"	Santaolalla	3:03
26.	"Grieving"	Santaolalla	2:19
27.	"The Island"	Quayle	4:13
28.	"Beyond Desolation"	Santaolalla	2:24
Total length:			76:56

=== Covers and Rarities ===
The Last of Us Part II: Covers and Rarities

Soundtrack album by Troy Baker, Ashley Johnson, and Chris Rondinella
- Released: September 27, 2021
- Genre: Soundtrack
- Length: 19:24
- Label: Sony Interactive Entertainment
- Producer: Gustavo Santaolalla; Mac Quayle

The Last of Us Part II: Covers and Rarities comprises five cover songs from the game and its marketing, produced by Santaolalla and Quayle. The covers are performed by actors Troy Baker and Ashley Johnson, who portrayed Joel and Ellie respectively, as well as guitarist Chris Rondinella. Sony published the album digitally on September 27, 2021, as part of The Last of Us Day. A vinyl record version was made available for preorder simultaneously, with art designed by Dani Pendergast and liner notes written by Druckmann. Johnson and Baker's cover of "Wayfaring Stranger" plays over the game's credits; completing the game on the "Grounded" difficulty setting will play Baker's cover of "Future Days", while completing on permadeath plays Johnson's cover of "Through the Valley".

The in-game covers became a significant part of the characters and their development, namely Ellie with her guitar. Druckmann found Ellie's guitar-playing allowed her access to memories and emotions; when she loses her fingers in the game's conclusion, it serves to sever ties to her memories and relationships. The song "Future Days" by Pearl Jam acts as a theme between Ellie and Joel throughout the game. The song was previously featured as part of One Night Live in an unbroadcast epilogue wherein Joel plays the song to Ellie. According to Druckmann, Sony was doubtful that Naughty Dog would receive permission to use the song; the band's manager agreed after hearing the story pitch, receiving a PlayStation 4, a copy of the first game, and an advanced screening of a trailer. Although the song's album Lightning Bolt was released two weeks after the onset of the in-game outbreak in September 2013, Druckmann recalled seeing a live performance of the song several months earlier in July, and felt its inclusion was realistic.

An acoustic cover of "True Faith", a song originally by New Order, was used in an animated commercial for the game. The cover is specifically inspired by a version of the song by Lotte Kestner, though she was not credited at the time; when Kestner reached out to Naughty Dog, Druckmann issued an apology and ensured proper credit. Shawn James was contacted by Sony in mid-2014 for permission to create a cover of his song "Through the Valley" for an upcoming game; he was unaware how it would be used until he watched the first trailer at the PlayStation Experience in December 2016. Druckmann enjoyed the song and felt it aligned with the game's darkness and emotion. The song went viral after the trailer's release, charting atop the Spotify viral charts in the United Kingdom. For the game's launch, Tash Sultana covered James's song for PlayStation Australia. Naughty Dog secured permission to use A-ha's "Take On Me" due to co-writer Halley Gross's friendship with Lauren Savoy, the wife of A-ha guitarist Paul Waaktaar-Savoy. Druckmann found the song's lyrics addressed the game's themes in a lighthearted manner. After Johnson worked with vocal coach Melissa Reese, the team felt her singing was too refined and asked her to consciously sing worse. Johnson and Baker performed "Wayfaring Stranger" in-character in the opening of a PlayStation Experience panel for the game in December 2017.

Side A
No.	Title	Writer(s)	Artist(s)	Length
1.	"Future Days"	Eddie Vedder	Troy Baker	3:40
2.	"True Faith (Inspired by Lotte Kestner's Cover)"	Bernard Sumner, Gillian Lesley Gilbert, Peter Hook, Stephen Hague, Stephen Paul David Morris	Ashley Johnson, Chris Rondinella	4:19
3.	"Through the Valley"	Shawn James Mavrides	Johnson, Rondinella	3:13

Side B
No.	Title	Writer(s)	Artist(s)	Length
4.	"Take On Me"	Magne Furuholmen, Morten Harket, Pal Waaktaar	Johnson, Rondinella	3:51
5.	"Wayfaring Stranger"		Johnson, Baker	4:21
Total length:				19:24

== Legacy ==
Santaolalla and Quayle's work on the game was nominated for at British Academy Games Awards, Game Audio Network Guild Awards, The Game Awards, Hollywood Music in Media Awards, New York Game Awards, and Webby Awards; it won the award for People's Voice at the Webby Awards. Scott Hanau, Rob Goodson, and Scott Shoemaker were also nominated for Outstanding Music Supervision at the Hollywood Music in Media Awards. Santaolalla adapted his music for the television adaptation of The Last of Us, which premiered in January 2023. Music from the series was covered by the orchestra London Music Works in a 2026 album.
