= Music of The Last of Us (TV series) =

Music of post-apocalyptic drama series

The music for the American post-apocalyptic drama television series The Last of Us was composed by Gustavo Santaolalla and David Fleming. Santaolalla composed the music for the video game franchise on which the series is based, including The Last of Us (2013) and The Last of Us Part II (2020). Several of Santaolalla's tracks from the video games were reused throughout the series; his work on the series focused on recrafting his previous material and working with silence, while Fleming created original music inspired by real-world sounds within a decayed civilization, making use of sampling techniques.

The first season features songs such as "Never Let Me Down Again" by Depeche Mode and "Long, Long Time" by Linda Ronstadt, as well as covers of these songs by Jessica Mazin and Nick Offerman, respectively. Similar songs were integrated in the second season, such as covers of Shawn James's "Through the Valley" and A-ha's "Take On Me" by Ashley Johnson and Bella Ramsey, respectively. Milan Records published the 66-track soundtrack album for the first season in February 2023, featuring the work of Santaolalla, Fleming, Mazin, and Offerman, as well as Jake Staley and Juan Luqui. The 41-track second-season soundtrack album was published in May 2025, featuring tracks from Santaolalla, Fleming, Staley, Luqui, Johnson, and Ramsey.

Critics praised the use of music throughout the series for its appropriateness and intensification of the writing. Fleming and Santaolalla were twice nominated at the World Soundtrack Awards, while Fleming won at the ASCAP Screen Music Awards and Santaolalla twice at the Imagen Awards. Music editor Maarten Hofmeijer and supervisor Ian Broucek received accolades at the Golden Reel Awards and Hollywood Music in Media Awards, respectively. Several songs saw increases in streams and charting following their use in the series, and Spotify's official playlist generated more than 1.6 million streams within six weeks.

== Production and composition ==
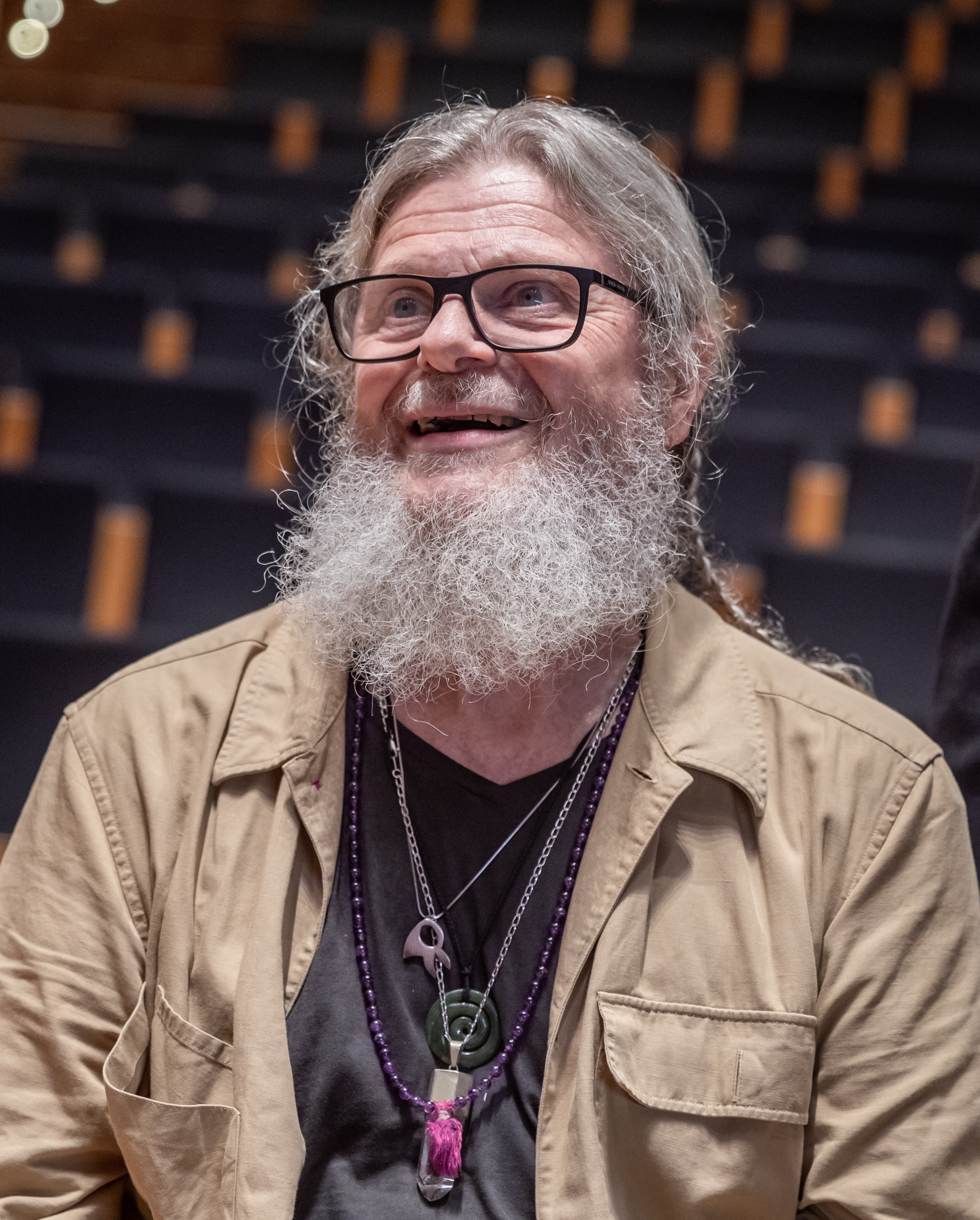
Gustavo Santaolalla, who worked on the video games, co-composed the score for the television series.

Gustavo Santaolalla and David Fleming compose the score for the series; Santaolalla, who composed the music for the games, The Last of Us (2013) and The Last of Us Part II (2020), was announced to be returning for the series in March 2020. He felt fans' relationship with the music made his return inevitable, noting it was so integral to the narrative that its absence or alteration would be akin to excluding lead characters Joel or Ellie; series creators Craig Mazin and Neil Druckmann considered his score part of "the DNA of The Last of Us". Santaolalla treated the series as "an expansion" of the games and kept them tied to each other, not seeking to revise or correct previous work as he considered it authentic and did not want to alienate fans; he primarily recrafted instead of creating new music, seeking to fit the themes and melodies within the scenes rather than create new ones. Some pieces fit while others were trimmed and edited.

Santaolalla thought Latino viewers would "recognize touches" of his music, and drew on his experiences in film and television, having composed some tracks for Jane the Virgin and Making a Murderer. He had around 185 cues for the first season, associated with specific on-screen actions, like a character opening a door or getting in a car. Santaolalla enjoyed the natural feeling of silence and felt it helped draw in viewers emotionally; he compared his use of silence to parkour, likening the calculations practiced before the athletes land to his measured selection of notes before he plays them. Santaolalla worked on the character-driven score and Fleming on the action-driven, and they collaborated on blending the two.

Fleming was a fan of Santaolalla's work (Note: Fleming was particularly familiar with Santaolalla's work on The Motorcycle Diaries (2004), Brokeback Mountain (2005), and Babel (2006) before working on The Last of Us.) before working on the series. He saw his own music as "crazy" and Santaolalla's as "very soft and emotional". His work was inspired by real sounds within a decayed civilization; he kept his score minimalistic like Santaolalla's and exercised restraint to match Mazin's goal of viewers feeling immersed within scenes rather than observing them, wanting thoughtful themes instead of "typical action music". Fleming selected instruments that paired appropriately with Santaolalla's work; rather than a generic drum, he wanted one with "personality", like "a rusty barrel or like cracking wood or bowing, rusty metal". Santaolalla noted Fleming's work added cohesiveness in his use of sampling specific sounds and maintaining the overall tone, noting his experience fulfilled aspects of the score that Santaolalla was unable to do.

Santaolalla and Fleming did not meet until after completing the first season. They returned to compose the score for the second, which Santaolalla felt enhanced their working relationship, impacting each other's work. Fleming found diverting from Santaolalla's original game score was often necessary to give the series its own identity, but otherwise sought to maintain the same feeling and avoid unnecessary diversion. He thought their different approaches complemented their individual tasks for the series. Mazin worked with the composers to determine specific sounds for each character and group, such as Ellie, Abby's friends, and the infected. Druckmann similarly considered music conducive to the narrative, akin to the game, with characters performing or listening to music contributing to worldbuilding or relationships. Santaolalla and Fleming scored Abby to match her anger, pain, and trauma akin to Ellie's, rather than as a traditional antagonist. Santaolalla is set to return for the third season.

== Integration and featured music ==
=== Season 1 ===
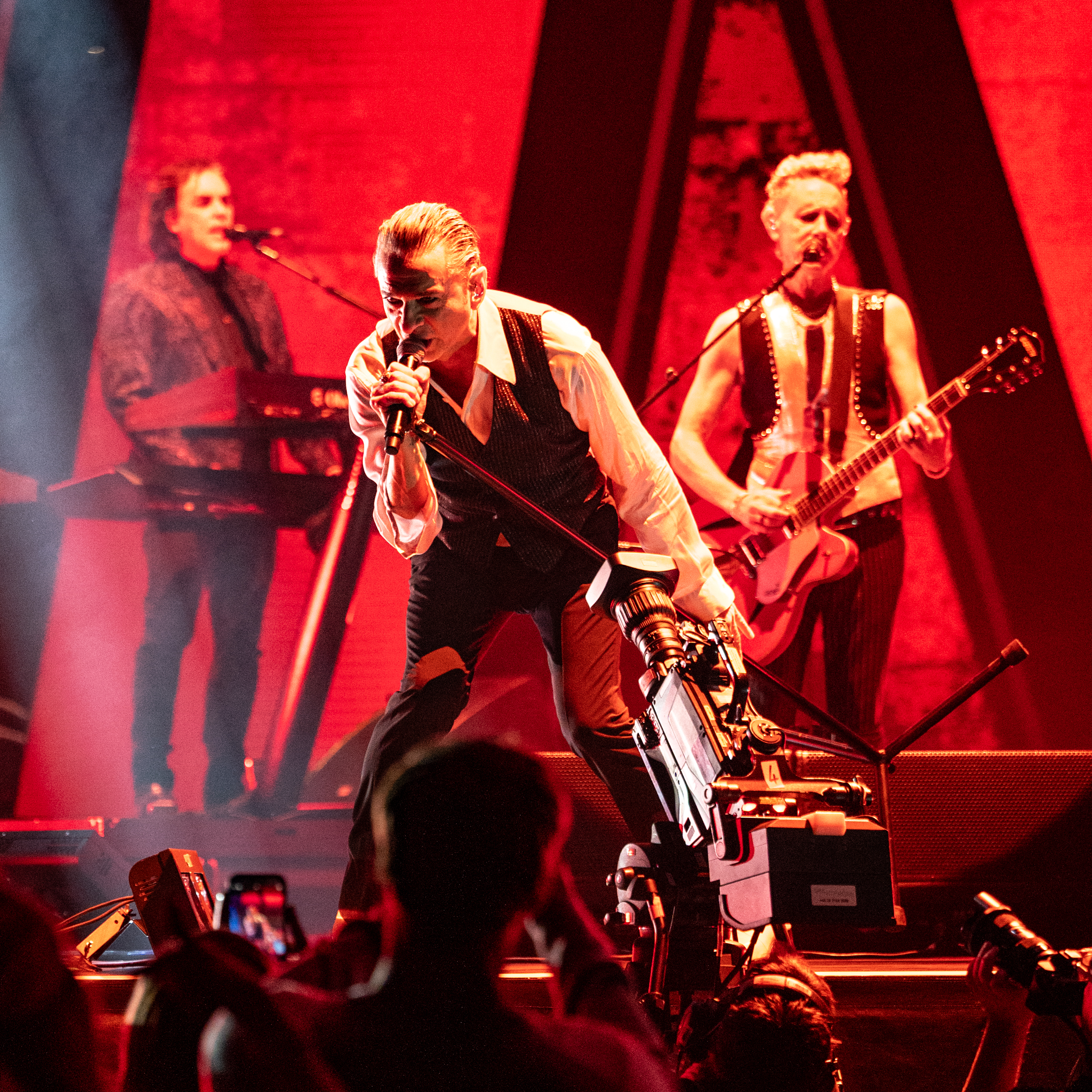
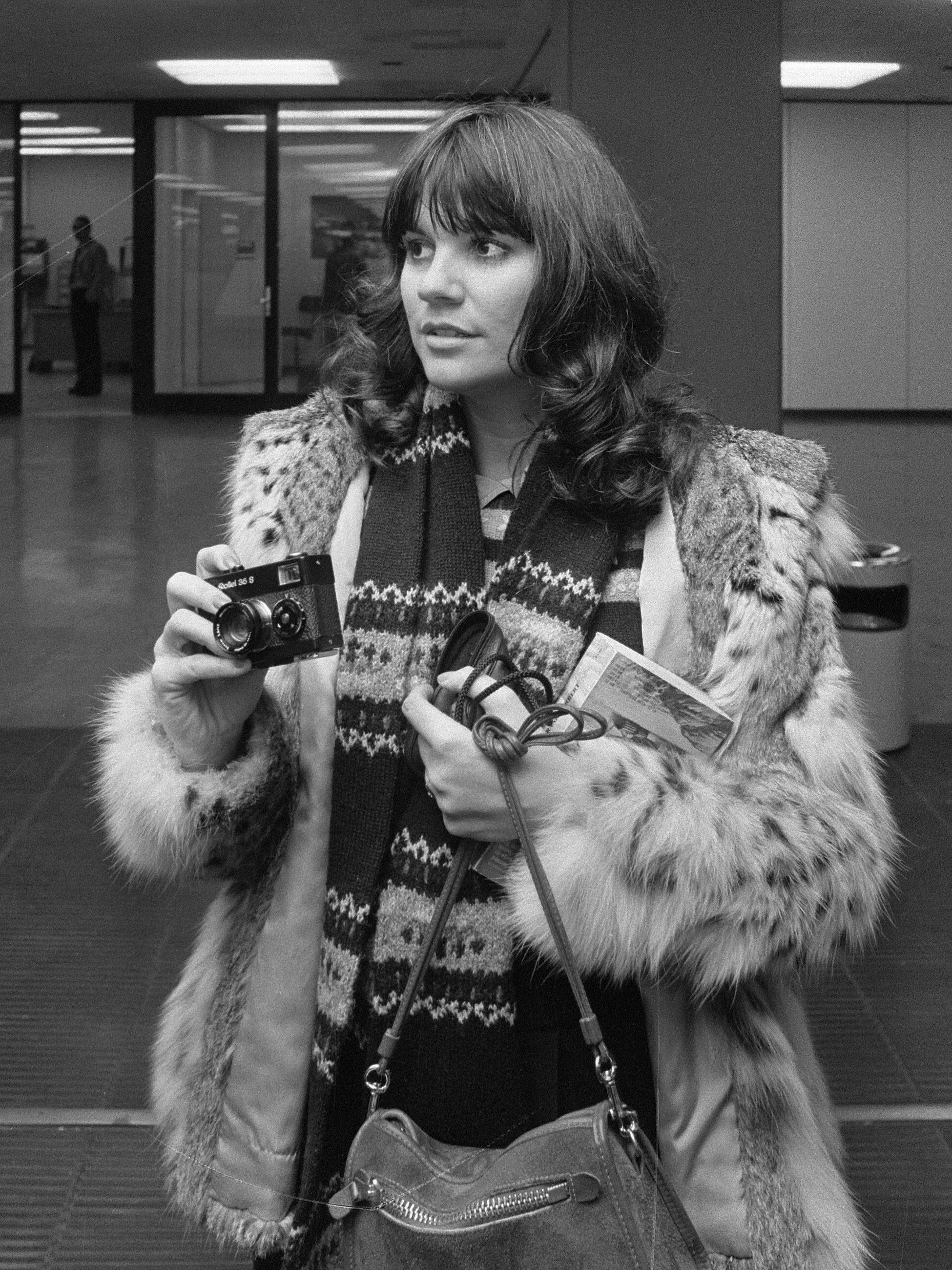
The first season features the music of Depeche Mode (left) and Linda Ronstadt (right).

For the first season, series editor Timothy A. Good used Santaolalla's game score as temp music during editing and found it influenced his decisions. Several songs from the games were reused to evoke particular emotions, such as "All Gone" in the sixth episode to remind viewers of Sarah's death. For the ninth episode, the music reflects the sadness of the action sequence; Mazin attempted several variations of music for the sequence, including dark and action-heavy tracks, but ultimately chose Santaolalla's "saddest" music from the game as the emotions were ultimately the same despite their usage within different contexts.

The final scene and credits of the first episode feature Depeche Mode's "Never Let Me Down Again", which Mazin chose due to its blend of upbeat sounds and dark lyrics. He felt its title referred to Joel and Ellie's relationship. The song topped two Billboard charts after broadcast. It returned in the sixth episode, performed by Mazin's daughter Jessica, to demonstrate Ellie feeling let down by Joel. The third episode uses "Long, Long Time" by Linda Ronstadt, which exhibits themes of unfulfilled love and how time heals wounds, echoing Bill and Frank's relationship. Streams of the song increased significantly following the episode's broadcast, and it topped three Billboard charts for the first time; several outlets compared it to the 2022 resurgence of Kate Bush's "Running Up That Hill" after its use in Stranger Things's fourth season.

The fourth episode's title, "Please Hold to My Hand", references the lyrics of Hank Williams's "Alone and Forsaken", played in the episode; the song was used in the game and one of the series's trailers. Its credits use Lotte Kestner's cover of "True Faith", which itself was covered by Ashley Johnson in-character as Ellie in a 2020 trailer for Part II. Both songs charted and saw increases in streams within 24 hours, as did Agnes Obel's "Fuel to Fire", used in the fifth episode. A-ha's "Take On Me" is used in the seventh episode; Ellie performs the song in Part II, and it charted after the episode aired. Pearl Jam's "All or None" was used to represent Ellie's loneliness and uncomfortability, while the title reflected her general attitude in life, and Etta James's version of "I Got You Babe" was reused from the game; Druckmann felt its romantic lyrics hidden by joyous music mirrored Ellie and Riley's feelings. Both songs saw streams increases within 24 hours. The inclusion of the Rockabye Baby! version of "Just Like Heaven" was Good's suggestion, having wanted to use it for some time.

=== Season 2 ===
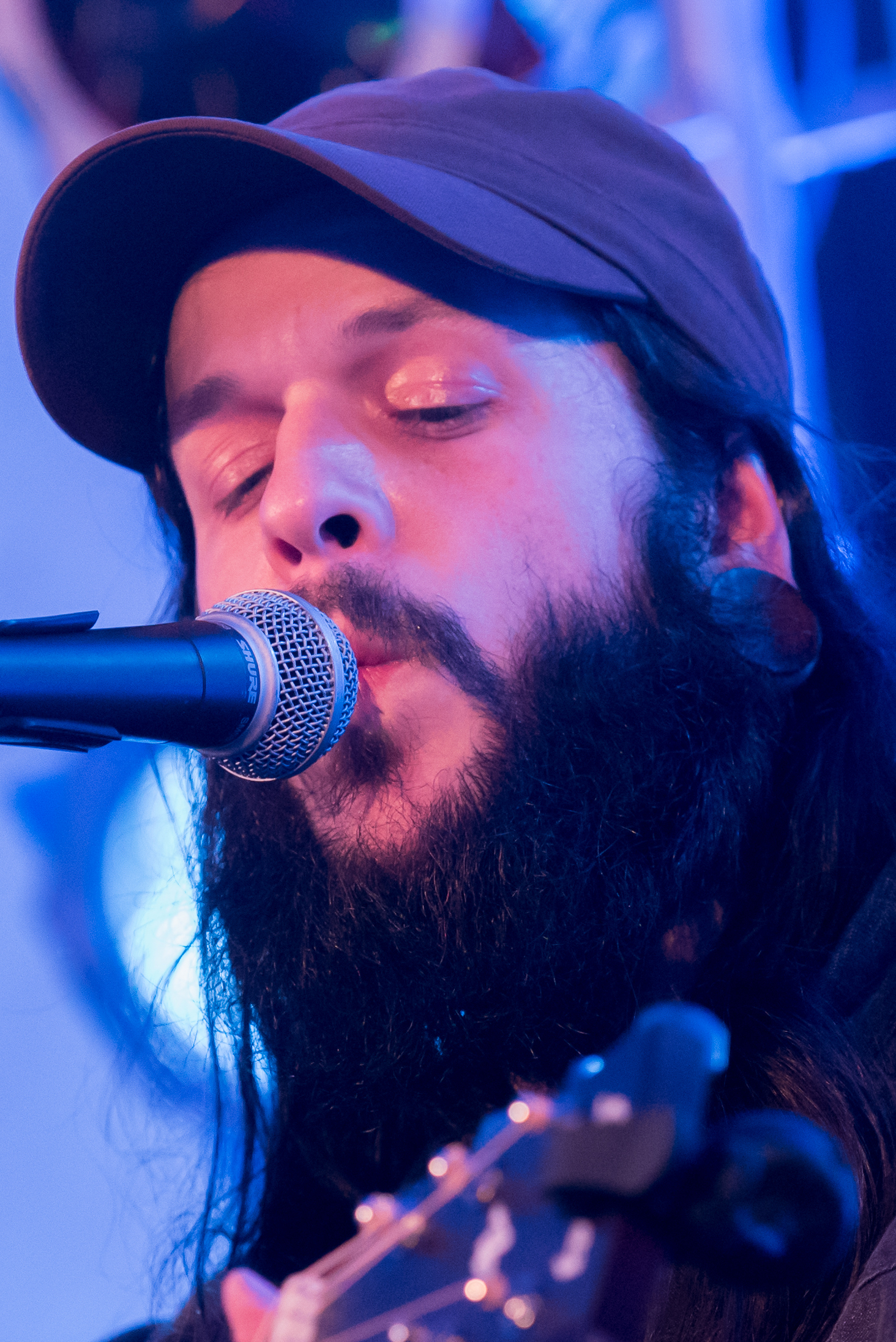
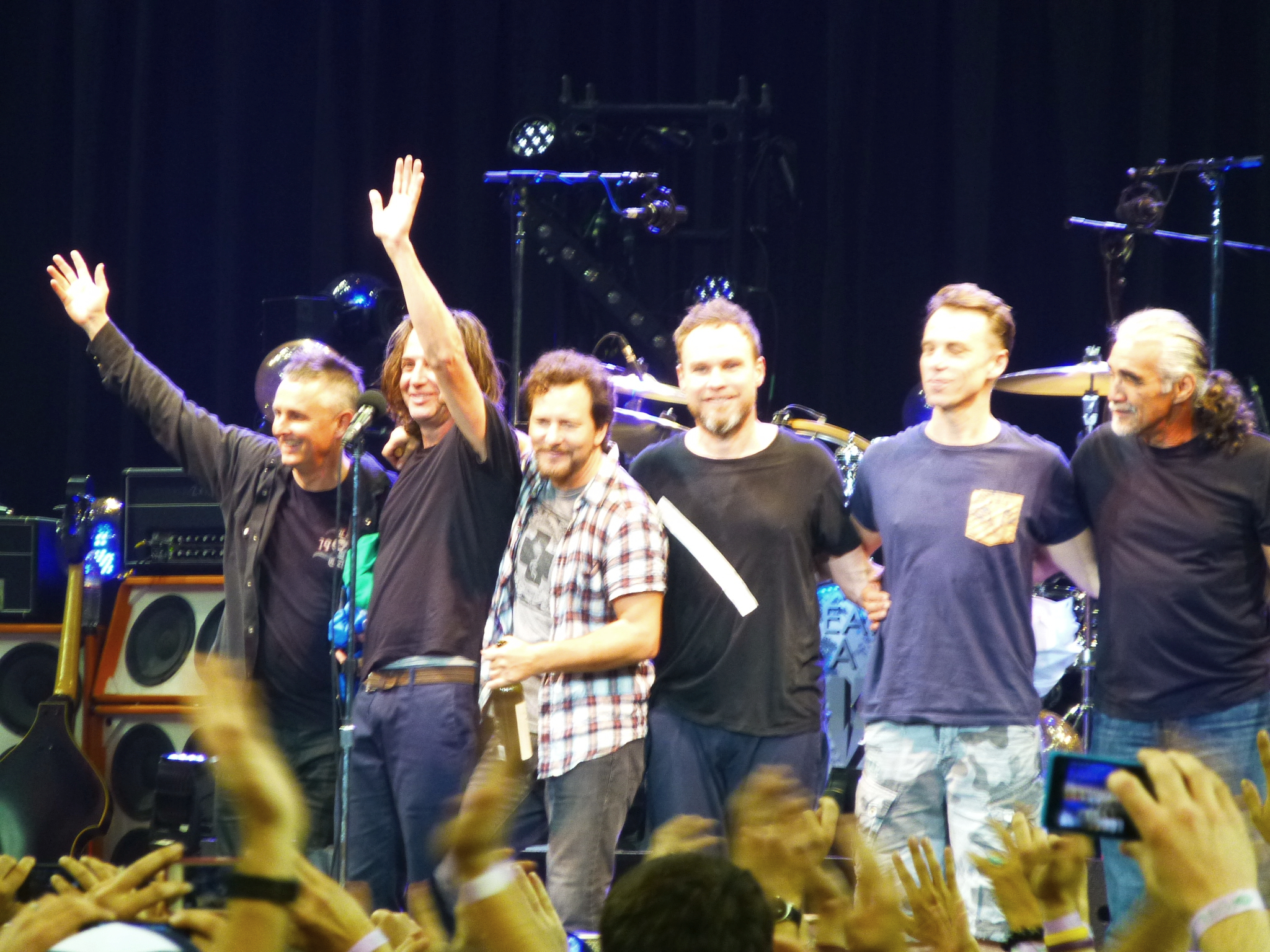
The second season features covers of Shawn James (left) and Pearl Jam's (right) songs.

Cast members noted performed music's presence during filming: Gabriel Luna (who portrays Tommy) had jam sessions on set, playing songs from artists like the Cranberries and Radiohead, and posted many on his Instagram account, including a duet with Ezra Agbonkhese (who portrays Tommy's son Benjamin). Young Mazino (who plays Jesse) recalled that cast members each purchased guitars to ensure their presence on set; any actor would play a song for those who knew it to join in performing, or those unfamiliar to learn. Mazino felt that "trad[ing] songs like Pokémon" helped the cast deal with intensity during filming. In integrating Santaolalla and Fleming's work into episodes, music supervisor Scott Hanau sought silence and minimalism, wanting to enhance the actors' performances rather than distract from them.

The second episode, "Through the Valley", ends with a cover of Shawn James's song "Through the Valley" performed by Ashley Johnson, who portrayed Ellie in the games and Ellie's mother Anna in the series. Johnson's cover featured in the second game and its marketing; the one featured in the episode is a blend of her original performance and a new recording. Mazin felt its usage reflected Anna's love for Ellie during the scene wherein Ellie mourns Joel, essentially placing both of Ellie's parents within the sequence. He found some lyrics represented the episode's events and others reflected an unachievable desire for its characters. Streams of Johnson's cover increased after the episode aired. The fourth episode, "Day One", sees Ellie serenade Dina on guitar playing A-ha's "Take On Me". Matching the scene in the game, Mazin thought the inclusion of the song was justified by narrative events, as Dina falls in love with Ellie as she performs; he was nervous as he felt the scene was one of the most meaningful to many people.

The sixth episode, "The Price", features Joel playing Pearl Jam's "Future Days", which recurs throughout the game and series. The song did not exist in 2003, when the outbreak takes place in the television series; Druckmann initially sought to honor the changed timeline, excluding the song and choosing alternatives. However, the writers ultimately chose to use "Future Days", considering its emotional connection more important than historical accuracy. Joel's actor Pedro Pascal was nervous about playing guitar in the episode, having little musical experience. He prepared with a vocal coach over the weekend before production, seeking a performance akin to Johnny Cash, a differing approach from what Troy Baker did in the game. Bella Ramsey (who portrays Ellie) helped him to play guitar and find the correct notes during filming. They found the scene emotional and endearing, especially due to Pascal's focus and inexperience. Mazin felt the scene mirrored Ellie's performance to Dina, considering it more of an expression of truth than a performance. Views for Ultimate Guitar's tabs for several songs increased significantly after their use in the series.

== Albums ==
=== Season 1 ===
The Last of Us: Season 1 (Soundtrack from the HBO Original Series)

Soundtrack album by Gustavo Santaolalla and David Fleming
- Released: February 27, 2023
- Genre: Soundtrack
- Length: 126:17
- Label: Milan

The Last of Us: Season 1 (Soundtrack from the HBO Original Series) comprises the score created for the television series The Last of Us, including several adapted from the video game series. Milan Records published the 66-track soundtrack album released digitally on February 27, 2023, after the seventh episode of the series. A CD of the soundtrack was first released in July, and a vinyl record by Mondo was released in September. Alongside the works of Santaolalla and Fleming, the soundtrack features tracks performed by Jake Staley and Juan Luqui, as well as Jessica Mazin's version of "Never Let Me Down Again" and Nick Offerman's of "Long, Long Time".

==== Track listings ====
The two-disc CD release features two additional tracks.

Disc 1
No.	Title	Writer(s)	Artist(s)	Length
1.	"The Last of Us"	Gustavo Santaolalla	Santaolalla	1:08
2.	"Reflections"	Santaolalla	Santaolalla	0:17
3.	"Get Out"	David Fleming	Fleming	7:14
4.	"All Gone"	Santaolalla	Santaolalla	1:34
5.	"The Quarantine Zone"	Santaolalla; Jake Staley	Santaolalla; Staley	1:45
6.	"Don't Look"	Fleming; Forest Christenson	Fleming	2:07
7.	"Forsaken"	Santaolalla	Santaolalla	0:42
8.	"Breaching the Wall"	Aldo Heriberto Arechar Aboytes; Fleming; Christenson	Fleming	3:45
9.	"Cargo"	Andrew Buresh; Santaolalla; Staley; Juan Luqui	Santaolalla; Staley; Luqui	1:02
10.	"Radio Silence"	Santaolalla; Luqui	Santaolalla; Luqui	2:41
11.	"Hope"	Santaolalla	Santaolalla	0:42
12.	"Greater Purpose"	Santaolalla; Staley	Santaolalla; Staley	1:03
13.	"Haven"	Santaolalla; Luqui	Santaolalla; Luqui	1:34
14.	"Set Everything Right"	Santaolalla	Santaolalla	1:21
15.	"Hive Mind"	Santaolalla; Staley; Mac Quayle	Santaolalla; Staley	1:38
16.	"Resolve"	Santaolalla	Santaolalla	1:48
17.	"Shortcut"	Fleming	Fleming	6:13
18.	"The Swarm"	Santaolalla; Luqui	Santaolalla; Luqui	2:09
19.	"Invited"	Santaolalla; Luqui	Santaolalla; Luqui	1:35
20.	"Long, Long Time"	Gary B. White	Nick Offerman	1:12
21.	"There Is No Girl"	Santaolalla; Luqui	Santaolalla; Luqui	1:05
22.	"It Can't Last (Sunset)"	Santaolalla	Santaolalla	1:48
23.	"Raiders"	Aboytes; Fleming	Fleming	1:47
24.	"Longing"	Santaolalla	Santaolalla	0:57
25.	"All Gone (Affliction)"	Santaolalla	Santaolalla	1:23
26.	"Surveillance"	Santaolalla; Staley	Santaolalla; Staley	1:58
27.	"Vanishing Grace"	Santaolalla	Santaolalla	1:25
28.	"All Gone (Purpose)"	Santaolalla	Santaolalla	1:22
29.	"Stockpile"	Santaolalla; Luqui	Santaolalla; Luqui	1:18
30.	"All Gone (Isolation)"	Santaolalla	Santaolalla	0:51
31.	"Salvation"	Santaolalla	Santaolalla	1:26
32.	"Warning Signs"	Fleming; Christenson	Fleming	2:45
33.	"The Last of Us (Prevail)"	Santaolalla	Santaolalla	0:49
34.	"All Gone (Reunion)"	Santaolalla	Santaolalla	1:38
Total length:				62:05

Disc 2
No.	Title	Writer(s)	Artist(s)	Length
1.	"Bravery"	Santaolalla; Luqui	Santaolalla; Luqui	1:27
2.	"Subterranean"	Aboytes; Fleming	Fleming	2:50
3.	"Murals"	Santaolalla; Luqui	Santaolalla; Luqui	1:31
4.	"Endure"	Fleming; Christenson	Fleming	1:30
5.	"Survive"	Fleming	Fleming	4:32
6.	"A Great Man"	Santaolalla	Santaolalla	1:58
7.	"All Gone (Promise)"	Santaolalla	Santaolalla	1:18
8.	"All Gone (Flashbacks)"	Santaolalla	Santaolalla	1:10
9.	"The Last of Us (Protection)"	Santaolalla	Santaolalla	1:14
10.	"Never Let Me Down Again"	Martin Gore	Jessica Mazin	3:30
11.	"Left Behind (Together)"	Santaolalla	Santaolalla	1:08
12.	"Fleeting"	Santaolalla	Santaolalla	0:55
13.	"Vanishing Grace (Devotion)"	Santaolalla	Santaolalla	0:52
14.	"Vanishing Grace (Radiant)"	Santaolalla	Santaolalla	1:17
15.	"Refuge"	Santaolalla	Santaolalla	0:45
16.	"The Choice"	Santaolalla	Santaolalla	1:24
17.	"Left Behind"	Santaolalla	Santaolalla	3:12
18.	"All Gone (Embrace)"	Santaolalla	Santaolalla	1:30
19.	"Collateral"	Santaolalla	Santaolalla	1:09
20.	"Resolve (Isolation)"	Santaolalla	Santaolalla	1:20
21.	"Complications"	Aboytes; Fleming	Fleming	2:33
22.	"Uncertain Course"	Santaolalla	Santaolalla	1:21
23.	"Breathless"	Santaolalla; Staley	Santaolalla; Staley	1:32
24.	"Unbroken"	Santaolalla	Santaolalla	1:29
25.	"All Gone (Elegy)"	Santaolalla	Santaolalla	0:45
26.	"Wounds"	Santaolalla	Santaolalla	1:24
27.	"Safe Surrender"	Fleming	Fleming	2:46
28.	"The Last of Us (Vengeance)"	Santaolalla	Santaolalla	2:59
29.	"All Gone (In Vain)"	Santaolalla	Santaolalla	1:05
30.	"All Gone (Ephemeral)"	Santaolalla	Santaolalla	1:48
31.	"The Settlement"	Santaolalla	Santaolalla	0:50
32.	"The Path"	Santaolalla	Santaolalla	1:41
Total length:				54:46

Additional CD tracks
No.	Title	Writer(s)	Artist(s)	Length
33.	"Never Let Me Down Again"	Gore	Depeche Mode	4:48
34.	"All or None"	Stone Gossard; Eddie Vedder	Pearl Jam	4:38
Total length:				64:12

The vinyl record release, split across two records, features some track changes.

Side A
No.	Title	Writer(s)	Artist(s)	Length
1.	"The Last of Us"	Santaolalla	Santaolalla	1:08
2.	"Get Out"	Fleming	Fleming	7:14
3.	"All Gone"	Santaolalla	Santaolalla	1:34
4.	"The Quarantine Zone"	Santaolalla; Staley	Santaolalla; Staley	1:45
5.	"Don't Look"	Fleming; Christenson	Fleming	2:07
6.	"Forsaken"	Santaolalla	Santaolalla	0:42
7.	"Breaching the Wall"	Aboytes; Fleming; Christenson	Fleming	3:45
8.	"Hope"	Santaolalla	Santaolalla	0:42
9.	"Haven"	Santaolalla; Luqui	Santaolalla; Luqui	1:34
10.	"Resolve"	Santaolalla	Santaolalla	1:48
Total length:				22:19

Side B
No.	Title	Writer(s)	Artist(s)	Length
1.	"The Swarm"	Santaolalla; Luqui	Santaolalla; Luqui	2:09
2.	"Long, Long Time"	White	Offerman	1:12
3.	"It Can't Last (Sunset)"	Santaolalla	Santaolalla	1:48
4.	"Raiders"	Aboytes; Fleming	Fleming	1:47
5.	"Longing"	Santaolalla	Santaolalla	0:57
6.	"All Gone (Affliction)"	Santaolalla	Santaolalla	1:23
7.	"Vanishing Grace"	Santaolalla	Santaolalla	1:25
8.	"All Gone (Purpose)"	Santaolalla	Santaolalla	1:22
9.	"All Gone (Isolation)"	Santaolalla	Santaolalla	0:51
10.	"Warning Signs"	Fleming; Christenson	Fleming	2:45
11.	"Salvation"	Santaolalla	Santaolalla	1:26
12.	"Subterranean"	Aboytes; Fleming	Fleming	2:50
13.	"The Last of Us (Prevail)"	Santaolalla	Santaolalla	0:49
14.	"Bravery"	Santaolalla; Luqui	Santaolalla; Luqui	1:27
Total length:				22:11

Side C
No.	Title	Writer(s)	Artist(s)	Length
1.	"Survive"	Fleming	Fleming	4:32
2.	"A Great Man"	Santaolalla	Santaolalla	1:58
3.	"All Gone (Flashbacks)"	Santaolalla	Santaolalla	1:10
4.	"Never Let Me Down Again"	Gore	Mazin	3:30
5.	"Left Behind (Together)"	Santaolalla	Santaolalla	1:08
6.	"Fleeting"	Santaolalla	Santaolalla	0:55
7.	"Vanishing Grace (Devotion)"	Santaolalla	Santaolalla	0:52
8.	"Never Let Me Down Again"	Gore	Depeche Mode	4:48
9.	"The Choice"	Santaolalla	Santaolalla	1:24
10.	"Left Behind"	Santaolalla	Santaolalla	3:12
Total length:				23:49

Side D
No.	Title	Writer(s)	Artist(s)	Length
1.	"All Gone (Embrace)"	Santaolalla	Santaolalla	1:30
2.	"Complications"	Aboytes; Fleming	Fleming	2:33
3.	"Collateral"	Santaolalla	Santaolalla	1:09
4.	"Resolve (Isolation)"	Santaolalla	Santaolalla	1:20
5.	"Unbroken"	Santaolalla	Santaolalla	1:29
6.	"All Gone (Elegy)"	Santaolalla	Santaolalla	0:45
7.	"Wounds"	Santaolalla	Santaolalla	1:24
8.	"The Last of Us (Vengeance)"	Santaolalla	Santaolalla	2:59
9.	"All Gone (In Vain)"	Santaolalla	Santaolalla	1:05
10.	"All Gone (Ephemeral)"	Santaolalla	Santaolalla	1:48
11.	"The Path"	Santaolalla	Santaolalla	1:41
12.	"All or None"	Gossard; Vedder	Pearl Jam	4:38
Total length:				22:21

==== Charts ====
Chart performance for The Last of Us: Season 1 (Soundtrack from the HBO Original Series)
Chart	Peak position
Belgian Albums (Ultratop Wallonia)	46
French Albums (SNEP)	171
German Albums (Offizielle Top 100)	55
Scottish Albums (Official Charts)	40
Spanish Albums (Promusicae)	97
UK Soundtrack Albums (Official Charts)	3
UK Albums Sales (OCC)	64
UK Physical Albums (OCC)	52
UK Vinyl Albums (OCC)	22

=== Season 2 ===
The Last of Us: Season 2 (Soundtrack from the HBO Original Series)

Soundtrack album by Gustavo Santaolalla and David Fleming
- Released: May 23, 2025
- Genre: Soundtrack
- Length: 111:50
- Label: Milan

Singles from The Last of Us: Season 2
- 1. "The Path" Released: April 28, 2025

The Last of Us: Season 2 (Soundtrack from the HBO Original Series) comprises the score created for the second season of The Last of Us. Milan Records published the 41-track soundtrack album digitally on May 23, 2025, ahead of the season finale, and a three-vinyl version by Mondo was released in June 2026, featuring designs by Janie Peacock. Alongside 37 score tracks featuring the works of Santaolalla and Fleming, assisted again by Staley and Luqui, the soundtrack features four vocal tracks: Ashley Johnson's version of "Through the Valley", Bella Ramsey's version of "Take On Me", and two songs by Crooked Still featuring Santaolalla.

The credits of the second season's third episode, "The Path", feature a new version of Santaolalla's song "The Path", originally composed for the first game. The new version was recorded in Santaolalla's Los Angeles studio La Casa with Tom Morello on guitar. Mazin, who is friends with Morello, suggested the collaboration to Santaolalla, who quickly agreed, being a fan of his bands Rage Against the Machine and Audioslave. Preceding the soundtrack album, it was released digitally as a single on April 28, 2025.

==== Track listing ====
Side A
No.	Title	Writer(s)	Artist(s)	Length
1.	"Reckoning"	Gustavo Santaolalla	Santaolalla	1:02
2.	"The Last of Us"	Santaolalla	Santaolalla	1:07
3.	"Ecstasy"	Aoife O'Donovan	Crooked Still; Santaolalla	6:14
4.	"Frozen Trail"	Santaolalla; Juan Luqui	Santaolalla; Luqui	0:57
5.	"Unbroken"	Santaolalla; Jake Staley	Santaolalla; Staley	3:57
6.	"Left Behind (The Journey)"	Santaolalla	Santaolalla	2:26
7.	"Follow the Rules"	Santaolalla	Santaolalla	0:59
8.	"Pack of Wolves"	David Fleming	Fleming	2:24
Total length:				19:06

Side B
No.	Title	Writer(s)	Artist(s)	Length
9.	"Aware"	Fleming	Fleming	2:52
10.	"Through the Valley"	Shawn James Mavrides	Ashley Johnson	2:07
11.	"The Path"	Santaolalla	Santaolalla; Tom Morello	2:14
12.	"Parting Ways"	Santaolalla	Santaolalla	5:32
13.	"Seeking Aid"	Santaolalla; Luqui	Santaolalla; Luqui	2:59
14.	"Wounds from the Past"	Santaolalla	Santaolalla	1:01
15.	"Relentless Endeavor"	Santaolalla	Santaolalla	1:11
16.	"Reverence"	Santaolalla; Luqui	Santaolalla; Luqui	2:35
Total length:				20:31

Side C
No.	Title	Writer(s)	Artist(s)	Length
17.	"Batten Down the Hatches"	Fleming	Fleming	4:22
18.	"At the Gates"	Fleming	Fleming; Forest Christenson	3:45
19.	"Inside the Walls"	Fleming	Fleming	4:46
20.	"Ensnared"	Fleming	Fleming; Jake Boring	3:29
21.	"Take On Me"	Magne Furuholmen; Morten Harket; Pål Waaktaar	Bella Ramsey	2:19
22.	"A Flicker of Yesterday"	Santaolalla; Luqui	Santaolalla; Luqui	1:12
Total length:				19:53

Side D
No.	Title	Writer(s)	Artist(s)	Length
23.	"All Gone (Consequences)"	Santaolalla	Santaolalla	1:48
24.	"Remembrance"	Santaolalla	Santaolalla	2:00
25.	"Arrival"	Santaolalla; Jake Staley	Santaolalla; Staley	1:35
26.	"Evasive Action"	Fleming; Christenson	Fleming	2:52
27.	"Double-Crossed"	Fleming	Fleming	2:05
28.	"Underground"	Fleming; Christenson	Fleming	4:53
Total length:				15:13

Side E
No.	Title	Writer(s)	Artist(s)	Length
29.	"Little Sadie"	O'Donovan	Crooked Still; Santaolalla	2:32
30.	"Perpetual Pursuit"	Santaolalla; Luqui	Santaolalla; Luqui	1:42
31.	"Closing In"	Aldo Heriberto Arechar Aboytes; Fleming	Fleming	3:13
32.	"First Flight"	Santaolalla	Santaolalla	2:10
33.	"Crossroads"	Santaolalla; Staley	Santaolalla; Staley	3:16
34.	"Sealed Fates"	Santaolalla	Santaolalla	3:14
35.	"Echoes of Yesterday"	Santaolalla; Luqui	Santaolalla; Luqui	1:07
Total length:				17:14

Side F
No.	Title	Writer(s)	Artist(s)	Length
36.	"The Depths"	Fleming; Boring	Fleming	4:15
37.	"Impending Storm"	Fleming; Boring	Fleming	5:05
38.	"End of the Line"	Fleming; Christenson	Fleming	3:33
39.	"The Gift"	Santaolalla	Santaolalla	2:22
40.	"Revelations"	Fleming	Fleming	1:53
41.	"Daybreak"	Santaolalla; Luqui	Santaolalla; Luqui	2:15
Total length:				19:23

== Related releases ==
=== Pearl Jam EP ===
The Last of Us

EP by Pearl Jam
- Released: May 12, 2025
- Genre: Soundtrack
- Length: 19:04
- Label: Monkeywrench

Pearl Jam chronology
Dark Matter (2024)	The Last of Us (2025)

The Last of Us is an extended play containing three Pearl Jam songs connected to the franchise. It features two versions of "Future Days": the studio recording from the 2013 album Lightning Bolt, and a live version from the 2024 Ohana Festival. Featured in Part II and the second season, the song is the namesake of the second-season premiere. The EP also features "All or None" and a reimagined version of "Present Tense", featured in the episodes "Left Behind" and "Feel Her Love", respectively.

Monkeywrench Records announced and published the EP digitally on May 12, 2025—the day after "Feel Her Love" aired—coinciding with the last week of the band's Dark Matter World Tour. A music video for "Future Days" was released simultaneously. A limited 12-inch vinyl record of the EP was released on Pearl Jam's website, exclusive to registered members; each side features two songs.

No.	Title	Writer(s)	Length
1.	"Future Days"	Eddie Vedder	4:22
2.	"All or None"	Vedder, Stone Gossard	4:37
3.	"Future Days (Live)"	Vedder	4:08
4.	"Present Tense (Redux)"	Mike McCready	5:55
Total length:			19:04

=== London Music Works ===
Music from The Last of Us

Remix album by London Music Works and Nick Squires
- Released: March 27, 2026
- Genre: Soundtrack
- Length: 59:35
- Label: Silva Screen
- Producer: Rick Clark

Music from The Last of Us is a remix album by London Music Works and Nick Squires. The 24-track album features orchestral cover versions of music from The Last of Us. It was released digitally by Silva Screen Records on March 27, 2026, followed by a vinyl record release by Diggers Factory on October 16 (delayed from June). The album was produced, mixed, and mastered by Rick Clark, while Justin Quinn played ronroco and acoustic guitars, John Gregson played electric guitars, and Will Harvey played violin and viola.

The first record includes music from the games while the second features music from the television series, including Max Richter's "On the Nature of Daylight" and a "stripped-back rendition" of "Take On Me". The album's first single—the opening track, "The Last of Us Part I"—was released digitally on February 27; London Music Works had previously covered the song for its 2018 album, The Essential Games Music Collection Vol.2.

Side A (The Last of Us Part I)
No.	Title	Writer(s)	Length
1.	"The Last of Us Part I"	Gustavo Santaolalla	3:03
2.	"Vanishing Grace"	Santaolalla	2:09
3.	"The Choice"	Santaolalla; Alan Umstead	1:42
4.	"The Last of Us (Goodnight)"	Santaolalla	0:51
5.	"All Gone (No Escape)"	Santaolalla; Umstead	2:58
6.	"The Path (A New Beginning)"	Santaolalla	2:47
Total length:			13:30

Side B (The Last of Us Part II)
No.	Title	Writer(s)	Length
7.	"The Last of Us Part II"	Santaolalla	2:52
8.	"Longing"	Santaolalla	1:45
9.	"Unbroken"	Santaolalla	4:38
10.	"Allowed to be Happy"	Santaolalla	2:48
11.	"Beyond Desolation"	Santaolalla	2:24
Total length:			14:27

Side C (Season 1)
No.	Title	Writer(s)	Length
12.	"Haven"	Santaolalla; Juan Luqui	1:33
13.	"Resolve"	Santaolalla	1:48
14.	"It Can't Last (Sunset)"	Santaolalla	1:48
15.	"Bravery"	Santaolalla; Luqui	1:26
16.	"All Gone (Flashbacks)"	Santaolalla	1:10
17.	"The Last of Us (Vengeance)"	Santaolalla	2:59
18.	"All Gone (Ephemeral)"	Santaolalla	1:48
Total length:			12:32

Side D (Season 2)
No.	Title	Writer(s)	Length
19.	"Unbroken"	Santaolalla	3:57
20.	"Left Behind (The Journey)"	Santaolalla	2:26
21.	"Remembrance"	Santaolalla	2:00
22.	"Daybreak"	Santaolalla; Luqui	2:15
23.	"On the Nature of Daylight"	Max Richter	6:09
24.	"Take On Me"	Magne Furuholmen; Morten Harket; Pål Waaktaar	2:19
Total length:			19:06

== Reception ==
Santaolalla and Fleming's score received praise, with CNET's Keane feeling it added "a yearning of sadness to the narrative". For the first episode, Total Film's Bradley Russell wrote the score was used to "intensify, but never overpower, the ... emotional beats". IGN's Simon Cardy praised its sparing use in the second episode "to great effect", and favorably compared the eighth episode's "pulsating electronic beats" to Blade Runner 2049's soundtrack. The mournful music during the first-season finale's action sequence was praised; IGN's Cardy felt it reflected the regretful tone, and Total Film's Russell considered it among the season's strongest musical moments. Russell similarly lauded the increasing tension of the music during the final scene. Spotify's official playlist for the series generated more than 1.6 million streams within six weeks. Kotaku's Kenneth Shepherd applauded the use of the giraffe encounter (Note: Depicted in "Look for the Light") song "Vanishing Grace" in the scene of Ellie finding the guitar in "Feel Her Love".

For the first season, Santaolalla won Best Music Composition for Film or Television at the 38th Annual Imagen Awards and was nominated for Outstanding Music Composition for a Series (Original Dramatic Score) for "Long, Long Time" at the 75th Primetime Creative Arts Emmy Awards and for Outstanding Original Score for a Television Production at the 5th SCL Awards, while Fleming won the 2024 ASCAP Screen Music Award for Composers' Choice: Television Score of the Year. Both were nominated for Television Composer of the Year at the 23rd Annual World Soundtrack Awards. Music editor Maarten Hofmeijer won Outstanding Achievement in Music Editing – Broadcast Long Form for "When You're Lost in the Darkness" at the Golden Reel Awards 2023, and music supervisor Ian Broucek won Best Music Supervision — Television at the 14th Hollywood Music in Media Awards. A series trailer was nominated for Best Music for a TV / Streaming Series at the 23rd Golden Trailer Awards. Offerman was nominated for Best TV Musical Performance at the Dorian Awards and Best Musical Moment at the 2023 MTV Movie & TV Awards.

After the second season, Santaolalla again won Best Music Composition for Film or Television at the 40th Annual Imagen Awards, while he and Fleming were nominated for Best Original Score – TV Show / Limited Series at the 16th Hollywood Music in Media Awards, Television Composer of the Year at the 25th Annual World Soundtrack Awards, and Outstanding Original Score for a Television Production at the 6th SCL Awards. Hofmeijer was again nominated for Outstanding Achievement in Music Editing – Broadcast Long Form for "Through the Valley" at the Golden Reel Awards 2025, and music supervisors Evyen Klean, Ian Broucek, and Scott Hanau were nominated for Outstanding Music Supervision for "The Price" at the 77th Primetime Creative Arts Emmy Awards; the series was also submitted for Outstanding Music Composition for a Series for the episode "Future Days". A trailer was nominated for Best Music (Trailer/Teaser) at the 25th Golden Trailer Awards.
