= Feel Her Love =

- The Last of Us episode
- Ellie (Bella Ramsey) prepares to torture Nora. The scene closely resembles the game's version, its lighting reflecting Ellie's anger. Ramsey's performance was praised.
- Episode no.: Season 2 Episode 5
- Directed by: Stephen Williams
- Written by: Craig Mazin
- Cinematography by: Ksenia Sereda
- Editing by: Timothy A. Good
- Original air date: May 11, 2025
- Running time: 45 minutes

Guest appearances
- Alanna Ubach as Hanrahan; Tati Gabrielle as Nora; Hettienne Park as Elise Park

Episode chronology
← Previous "Day One"	Next → "The Price"
- The Last of Us season 2

"Feel Her Love" is the fifth episode of the second season of the American post-apocalyptic drama television series The Last of Us. Written by series co-creator Craig Mazin and directed by Stephen Williams, it aired on HBO on May 11, 2025. The episode follows Ellie (Bella Ramsey) and Dina (Isabela Merced) on their second day in Seattle as they make their way towards the hospital to find Nora (Tati Gabrielle) to question her on Abby's whereabouts.

The episode introduces spores—the vector through which the Cordyceps infection is spread in the games—to reinforce Ellie's immunity. Several scenes were written to match the game, and Naughty Dog's audio department was consulted in adapting the Seraphites' whistled language. Critics praised the direction, cinematography, cold open, horror, Ramsey's performance, and Ellie and Dina's chemistry, though some considered the writing slow and contrived. The episode had 652,000 viewers on linear television.

== Plot ==
In Seattle's Lakehill Hospital, Washington Liberation Front (WLF) commanding officer Hanrahan questions Sergeant Elise Park, who led an operation with her son Leon to clear the hospital's basement. Leon had informed her the patrolmen had discovered that the Cordyceps has become airborne and told his mother to seal them in. Hanrahan commends Elise's decision and says only a select few will know about the fungus's airborne nature as the hospital is too important.

After confirming Nora is in Lakehill, Ellie and Dina begin their second day in Seattle by deciding to pass by a warehouse that the WLF avoid. Along the way, Ellie questions bringing Dina after they encounter more dead members of the Seraphites, a religious group. Dina reiterates her commitment to help Ellie's quest for revenge against Abby for Joel's death, (Note: Abby killed Joel in "Through the Valley", assisted by several friends including Nora.) citing a childhood memory when she killed a raider who murdered her mother and sister.

At the warehouse, Ellie and Dina are ambushed by several intelligent infected known as stalkers. Ellie offers to sacrifice herself while Dina runs to safety, but they are narrowly saved by Jesse, who had pursued them to Seattle with Tommy. The three evade the WLF, who stop when they enter the local park controlled by the Seraphites. Ellie, Dina, and Jesse witness the Seraphites disembowel a WLF soldier. The Seraphites shoot Dina in the leg with an arrow, and Ellie creates a diversion while Jesse carries Dina to safety. Ellie discovers the hospital is nearby and continues her journey alone.

At Lakehill, Ellie holds Nora at gunpoint to interrogate her for Abby's whereabouts. Nora apologizes for the brutality of Joel's death before taunting her about it. Nora fights back and escapes to the basement. Ellie follows her and discovers infected WLF soldiers, including Leon, whose bodies exhale Cordyceps spores, infecting Nora but not Ellie. Nora realizes Ellie is the immune girl for whom Joel had killed the Fireflies, including Abby's father, (Note: Joel's killing of the Fireflies was depicted in "Look for the Light".) who sought to develop a cure for the fungus. To Nora's shock, Ellie reveals she knew about Joel's actions, before picking up a pipe and beginning to brutally beat and torture Nora for Abby's whereabouts.

In a flashback, Ellie wakes up in Jackson, Wyoming, and is happily greeted by Joel.

== Production ==
=== Conception and writing ===
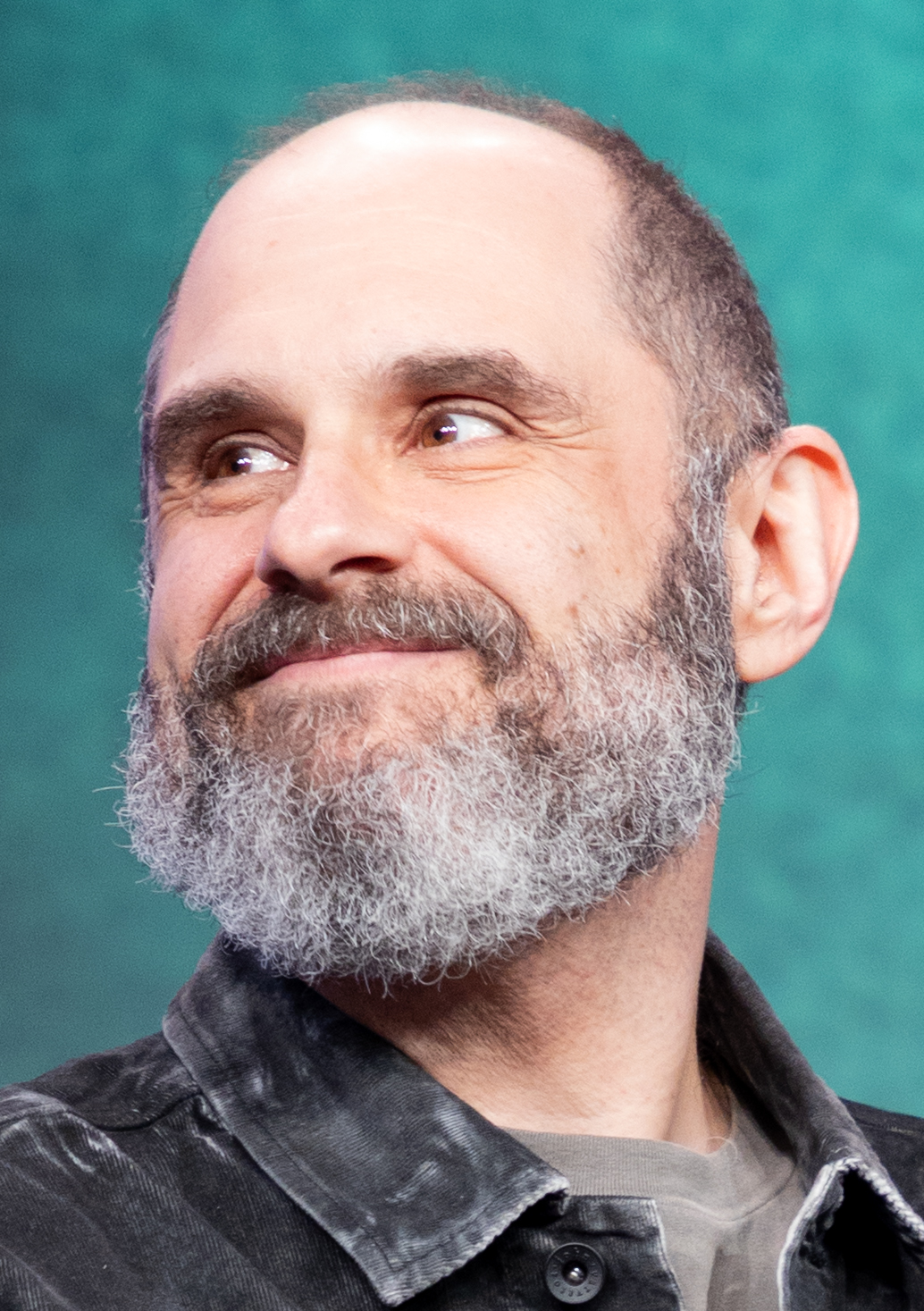
"Feel Her Love" was written by series co-creator Craig Mazin.

"Feel Her Love" was written by The Last of Us series co-creator Craig Mazin and directed by Stephen Williams. The writers felt Elise's decision to sacrifice her son was the opposite of Joel's decision to save Ellie in the first season. Williams felt the scene's ambiguity reflected the disorientation of the audience and characters. Scenes of conflict between the Seraphites and WLF—such as the dead Seraphites against a wall—were partly inspired by scenes from the film Come and See (1985).

Spores—through which the infection is spread in the games—were replaced by tendrils in the series but reintroduced in "Feel Her Love" as the writers wanted to recreate the moment in which Nora realizes Ellie is immune, unaffected by the spores. Neil Druckmann, the series's co-creator who co-wrote and co-directed the game, felt their reintroduction kept the threat dynamic and dramatic, as the world continues changing around the characters. The hospital basement scene was largely similar to the game, though some dialogue was changed due to the series's altered timeline.

Mazin considered several alternatives to Pearl Jam's "Future Days" but Druckmann felt including a short section of the song was more effective, and they appreciated the lyrics' deeper meaning. Mazin wanted the scene to imply the reemergence of Ellie's dark side and need to punish. When watching the scene with editor Timothy A. Good, they heard a low rumble, which Mazin assumed was Good's addition; it was actually from a neighboring room, where Emily Mendez was editing the episode "Convergence". They took the sound and added it to "Feel Her Love", which Mazin considered serendipitous. The credits feature Pearl Jam's "Present Tense (Redux)", a new version of its 1996 song; the band released an extended play featuring the song on May 12, 2025.

In writing the Seraphites' scene in the forest, Mazin recalled the feeling of playing the game and hearing their whistles. The series's audio team met with Naughty Dog's audio department—who, in creating the game, had created a whistled language for the Seraphites—to learn the language and share assets, and the whistles were re-recorded for the episode. Some whistles were slightly adjusted to achieve deeper emotional impact rather than accuracy, but they were mostly similar to those in the game. The writers did not want to include violence—such as the Seraphites disemboweling the WLF soldier—simply to shock the audience but to impact them and the characters. The decision for Dina to get shot by an arrow was due to the series's more realistic focus, as Ellie being shot, like in the game, would have prevented her from continuing.

=== Casting and characters ===
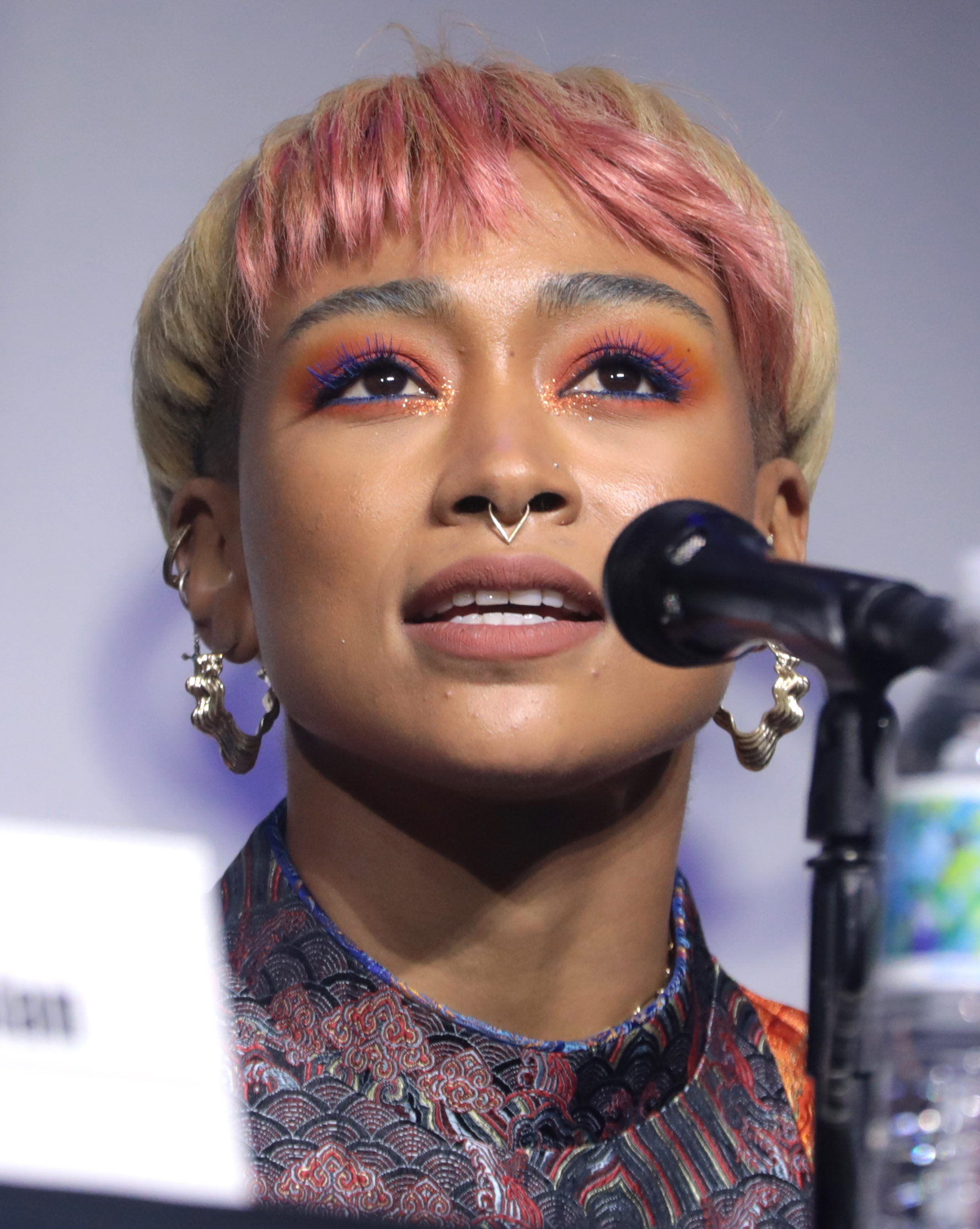
Tati Gabrielle was told to approach Nora's scene with Ellie as if she was a doubtful Christian who was seeing Jesus Christ or the face of God.

Bella Ramsey, who portrays Ellie, enjoyed working with Williams due to his openness with blocking scenes, allowing the actors to collaboratively follow their instincts rather than prescribed paths. Ramsey appreciated the opportunity to explore Ellie's violence, in contrast with their own behavior; in their opinion, Ellie disliked that she was becoming more like Joel in her capacity for violence but found the moment cathartic, being blinded by her rage. Ramsey felt the red lights reflected Ellie "seeing red", and considered the basement the scariest set, making them "feel a bit sick and uneasy" despite its beauty.

Isabela Merced rehearsed Dina's monologue about her family for two months before filming and sought to deliver it nonchalantly, thinking Dina would avoid melodramatics. She found it important to establish that Dina, despite her apparent levelheadedness, seeks revenge like Ellie, though Merced felt Dina's experience "should have been a message that resonated differently" rather than as justification for revenge. She felt Dina's bluntness was a way to process her trauma, and Ellie touching her cheek allowed her to release the tension and grief. Young Mazino thought his character, Jesse, was more annoyed at Ellie and Dina's revenge quest than their growing romance.

Tati Gabrielle approached Nora's first scenes in the episode as if she was disassociating, torn between the justice and brutality of Joel's death. Gabrielle experienced a close death around the time of filming and recalled her "brain was a little in and out". She thought Nora's behavior was prompted by her loyalty to Abby and her father, as she felt Joel's killing of the Fireflies "doomed the world". She played Nora's apology to Ellie as genuine, believing she is also traumatized by the brutality of Joel's death, even though she felt he deserved justice for his actions. Gabrielle enjoyed the action scenes, which required several takes; she felt Nora would sprint to defend herself but was told to slow down. When Gabrielle landed incorrectly in an elevator shaft, Williams, cautious about stunt work, halted filming for the day despite Gabrielle's insistence, as his "heart [couldn't] take it anymore".

Gabrielle "nerded out" with Mazin about Nora's infection from the spores, wanting to ensure the details were correct. Nora begins twitching as the infection overtakes her mind; Gabrielle found the combination of emotional and physical performance "probably the hardest thing [she has] ever had to do as an actor". When Nora realizes Ellie is immune, Williams and Mazin explained the scene to Gabrielle as if Nora was a slightly doubtful Christian who was seeing Jesus Christ or the face of God. Gabrielle thought Nora realized she had no hope after discovering Ellie already knew about Joel's actions, as it meant her quest was purely for revenge. She recalled the resolve in Ramsey's eyes helped her find Nora's emotions as she pleads to Ellie. Gabrielle insisted that Ramsey hit her harder during filming, considering it fair after she held Ramsey down for hours while filming the second episode. They rehearsed the scene together but did not want to influence each other's work, preferring to keep their performances honest.

=== Filming ===
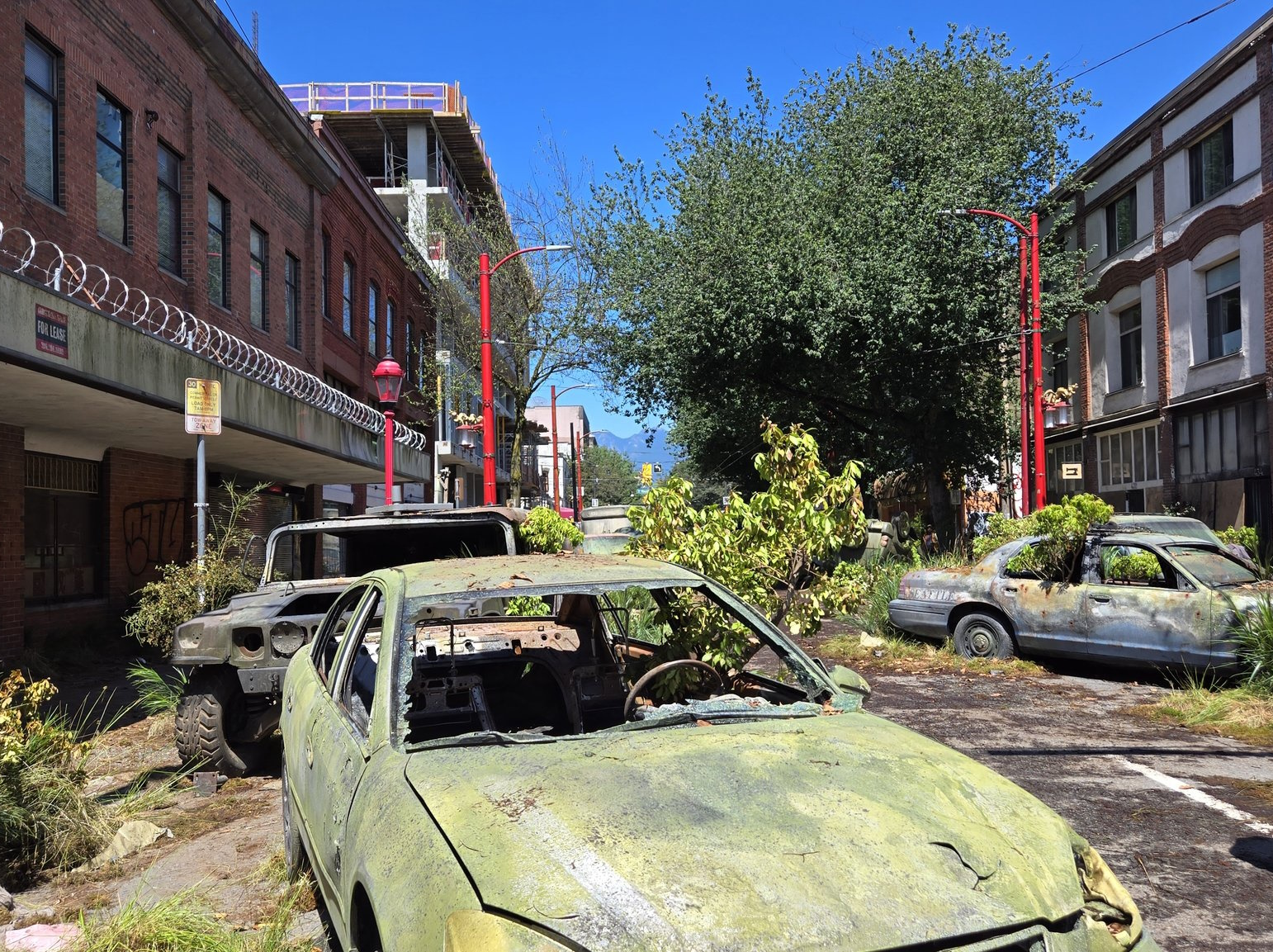
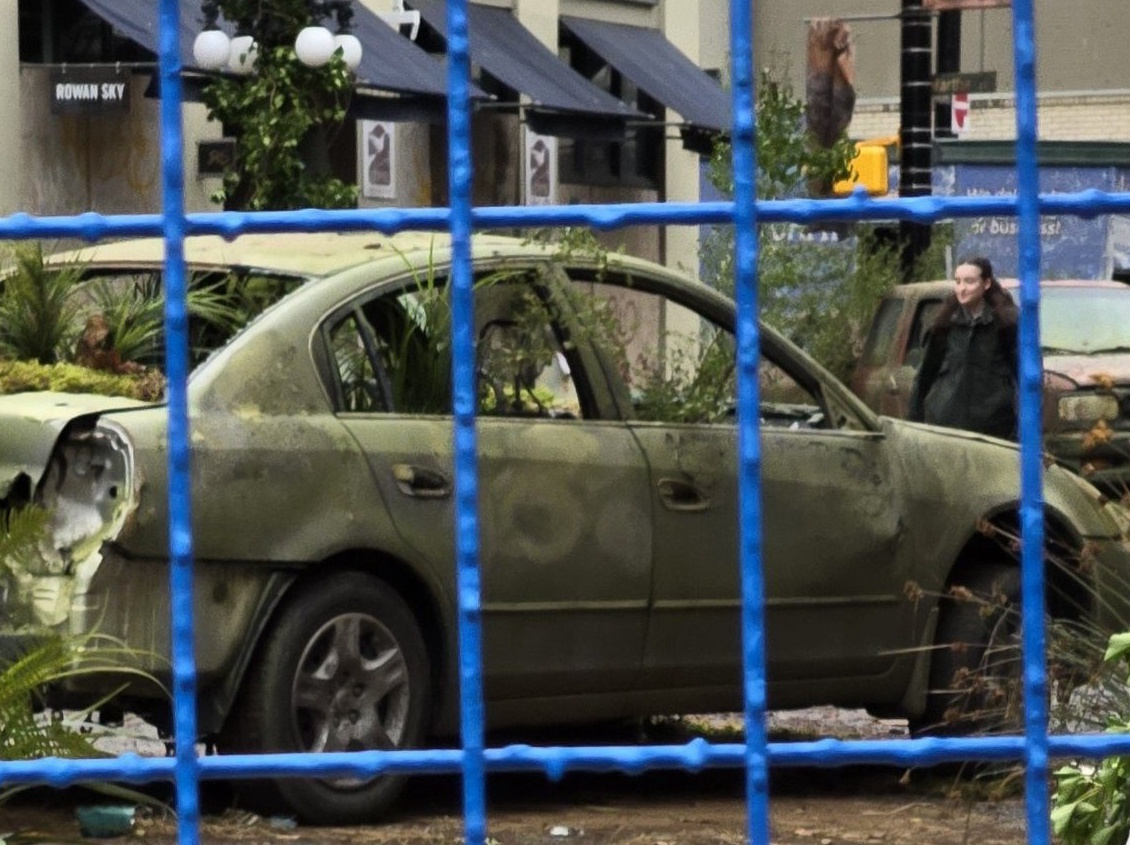
Filming took place in Downtown Vancouver in July and August 2024.

Production for the episode began around May 2024. The series's lead director of photography, Ksenia Sereda, worked with Williams. Filming took place in Downtown Eastside on July 12 and moved to Stanley Park on July 13 and Downtown Vancouver on July 25. A section of Harbour Green Park in Coal Harbour was closed from July 25–27 for production, featuring foliage and several abandoned cars. Stanley Park was used for the Seraphites' park scenes, which supervising location manager Nicole Chartrand felt reflected the idea of "overgrowth in an urban setting". Williams ensured the scene was anchored on the characters to avoid feeling like "just a big action set-piece".

The theater's exterior was filmed on a backlot and the interior lobby was on a soundstage. The auditorium was filmed at the Orpheum theatre, which was digitally aged by the visual effects teams while maintaining some cleanliness to demonstrate its preservation. Mazin and Druckmann were happy with the location's similarities to the game's version; some elements were constructed by production designer Don Macauley and his team to closer match the game, including the carpet design. The red lighting of Ellie and Nora's scene in the hospital basement matches the game. Mazin liked that the lighting made Ellie's eyes black; he and Good called Ellie "baby shark" because of the darkness and death in her eyes.

The scene with the stalkers was filmed in a former Dairyland Canada factory in British Columbia, which housed some costumes and props used for the first season of Shōgun. The stalkers' eyes were designed to reflect light akin to animals like dogs and sheep at night; Mazin wanted to ensure they looked realistic, not like Jawas from Star Wars, and Druckmann felt it reflected the infection eating away their eyes like cataracts. The stalkers' performers trained in their movements, akin to dancing. When Jesse arrives, Sereda used a device from Lensbaby to distort the lens and create a blurry, dazed effect to reflect Ellie's confusion, in which she briefly believes Jesse is Joel.

== Reception ==
=== Broadcast and ratings ===
The episode aired on HBO on May 11, 2025. On linear television, the episode had 652,000 viewers, with a 0.14 ratings share. The series was the most-viewed across all streaming services for the following week, and the seventh-most-viewed for overall watch time, with 745 million minutes streamed on Max. It was among the most in-demand shows in Canada, with more than 59 times the average television demand the preceding week and more than 48 times the following week.

=== Critical response ===
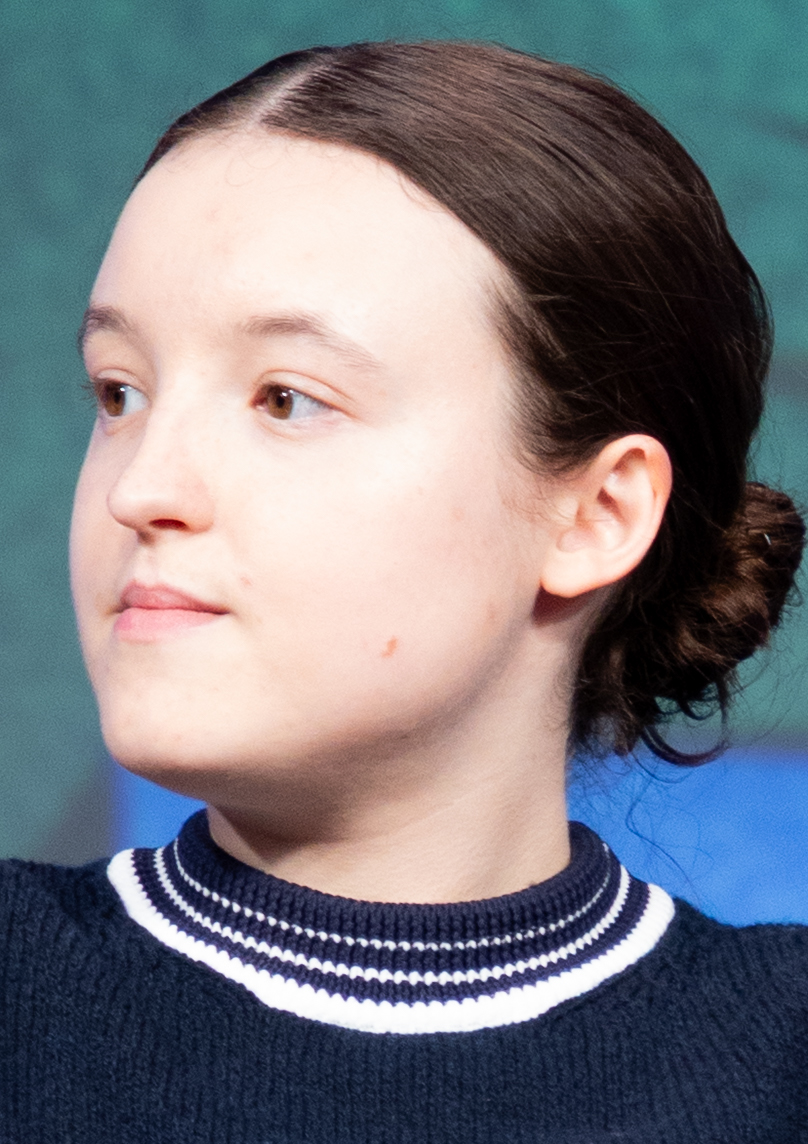
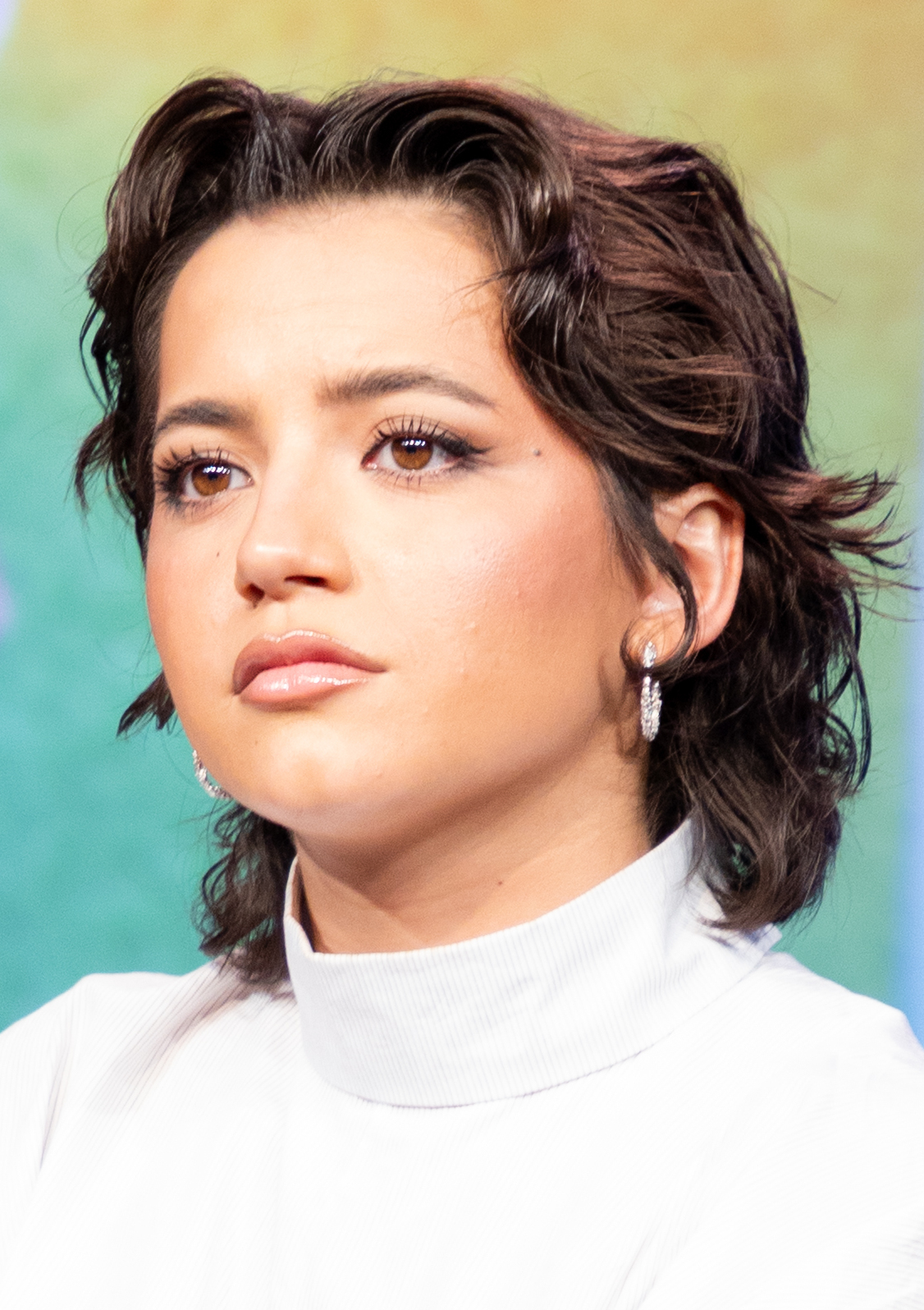
Several reviewers praised the flirty chemistry between Ellie and Dina, portrayed by Bella Ramsey (left) and Isabela Merced (right), respectively.

"Feel Her Love" has an approval rating of 95% on review aggregator Rotten Tomatoes based on 22 reviews, with a 7.4/10 average rating. The website's critical consensus noted the episode "may slow the momentum of the season, but its plot forward format doesn't detract from its grisly punch". Den of Geek's Brynna Adams wrote it "does a phenomenal job of setting up the stakes to come", and IGN's Simon Cardy called it "a good episode, but not quite at the same height" as the preceding one. CBR's Katie Doll considered it the season's weakest episode to date but noted "the fact that it's still great is a testament to the show's quality". IndieWire's Ben Travers lauded Williams's direction, particularly in the stalker scene and the framing of Jesse's entrance. Several critics praised the imagery of the basement's spores; Rolling Stone's Alan Sepinwall called it among the series's "most memorable creepy and disgusting imagery". Kotaku's Kenneth Shepherd applauded the use of the giraffe encounter (Note: Depicted towards the end of The Last of Us (2013) and in the first-season finale of the television series (2023)) song "Vanishing Grace" in the scene of Ellie finding the guitar. The episode was nominated for Outstanding Prosthetic Makeup (Note: Nominees: department head makeup artist Paul Spateri; prosthetic designer Barrie Gower; and key prosthetic makeup artists Lucy Pittard, Johnny Murphy, Colum Mangan, Gillian Jarvis, Sarah Pickersgill, and Chris Devitt) at the 77th Primetime Creative Arts Emmy Awards.

Ramsey's performance in the hospital basement scene was described as "like a snake shedding its skin" by Total Film's Alex Zalben and "as if Ellie has dissociated" and "transformed herself into Abby" by The A.V. Club's Caroline Siede. Eurogamer's Victoria Kennedy lauded Ramsey's portrayal of Ellie's "declining mindset and disassociation" and The Daily Beast's Kaiya Shunyata called them "the perfect actor to portray this descent into madness", citing their mix of violence and fascination. CBR's Doll felt it eradicated any doubt in Ramsey's ability to perform Ellie's rage, though IGN's Cardy and Screen Rant's Mary Kassel were unconvinced, which the former partly attributed to the scripts making Ellie childlike. Several reviewers praised the writing and performances of Ellie and Dina's flirty chemistry, though Kotaku's Shepard felt it was weakened by their relationship's quicker pacing in the series's altered timeline. The A.V. Club's Siede found their self-awareness made their recklessness less enjoyable. Eurogamer's Kennedy praised the fear and defiance of Gabrielle's performance, and CBR's Doll appreciated her added characterization. The A.V. Club's Siede found Dina's monologue "almost academic in its dissection of her motivations" and thought it would have been more impactful as a flashback, and Screen Rant's Kassel considered it unsubtle in "featuring the perfect moral compromise Ellie wants to hear" but necessary for the character and audience. Some critics called Jesse's appearance a contrived deus ex machina, and Kotaku's Shepard felt his personality being angstier than his game counterpart was to make Ellie's actions more palatable.

Several critics praised the ominous and chilling cold open and the stalker scene. Reviewers appreciated the introduction of spores, though IGN's Cardy found them inconsequential and unnecessary. Some considered the episode slow in its narrative advancement; The New York Times's Noel Murray felt the season's repetitive Seattle setting made the story feel "exhausting" and "a bit stuck", and Vanity Fair's Joshua Rivera deemed the pacing disorienting without familiarity of the games. The A.V. Club's Siede disliked the repetition of themes from the previous episode. Kotaku's Shepard found Nora's torture scene unsubtle compared to the game's version, citing its added exposition, and considered it "the most damning example of a trend of The Last of Us subjecting Black characters to the worst fates". IGN's Cardy felt keeping the brutality offscreen lessened its impact and protected Ellie's image in a manner not afforded to Abby during Joel's death. He considered the Seraphites' park scene impactful and its design reminiscent of the films Apostle and Kill List. Rolling Stone's Sepinwall unfavorably compared the Seraphites to the later seasons of The Walking Dead and found the focus on the WLF unbalanced: enough to draw focus from the protagonists, but not enough to develop them sufficiently. Esquire's Brady Langmann thought the Seraphite–WLF war had become confusing due to the split focus between the groups. Some critics questioned how characters were able to evade WLF soldiers without being shot or caught.
