= Souls for Sale (album) =

Studio album by Verbena
- Released: 1997
- Recorded: 1996
- Genre: Rock
- Length: 37:13 (US); 36:52 (UK)
- Label: Setanta; Merge (US)
- Producer: Dave Fridmann, Verbena, Jim Jones (tracks 2, 8, 9 & 10)

Verbena chronology
Pilot Park EP (1996)	Souls for Sale (1997)	Into the Pink (1999)

Souls for Sale is the debut album by the rock band Verbena, released in 1997. It is the only album that they recorded as a quartet. The UK version of the album has a different version of "Postcard Blues", lasting 2:30. The album was released on Setanta Records, under license to Merge Records in the U.S.

== Critical reception ==
Professional ratings
Review scores
Source	Rating
AllMusic	4/5 stars
NME	6/10

The Chicago Tribune wrote that "Verbena swaggers through fetching backroads ballads and smoldering rock with an untutored power and craft that needs no refinement."

== Track listing ==
All songs written by Verbena.

1. "Hot Blood" – 3:46
2. "Shaped Like a Gun" – 3:21
3. "Junk for Fashion" – 5:03
4. "The Song That Ended Your Career" – 4:25
5. "The Desert" – 3:16
6. "Hey, Come On" – 3:01
7. "Me & Keith" – 4:21
8. "So What" – 3:23
9. "Postcard Blues" – 2:54
10. "Kiss Yourself" – 3:48

== Personnel ==
- Scott Bondy – vocals and guitar
- Anne Marie Griffin – guitar and vocals
- Duquette Johnston – bass guitar
- Les Nuby – drums

Production

- Producer: Dave Fridmann and Verbena
- Producer: Jim Jones (tracks 2, 8, 9, and 10)
- Engineer: Dave Fridmann and Verbena
- Mixing: Phil Thornalley
- Design: Arcrane
- Photography: Mark Gooch
- Mix studio: RAK studios
