= Believers (A. A. Bondy album) =

Studio album by A.A. Bondy
- Released: September 13, 2011
- Genre: Folk
- Length: 40:51
- Label: Fat Possum

A.A. Bondy chronology
When the Devil's Loose (2009)	Believers (2011)	Enderness (2019)

Believers is the third album by folk artist A.A. Bondy, released September 13, 2011, on Fat Possum Records. The album was recorded at Mant/Kingsize Studios in Glassell Park, Los Angeles in the spring of 2011 and produced by Rob Schnapf.

== Critical response ==
Spin gave Believers a score of 8/10, calling it an album of "deceptively austere alt folk...ludicrously gorgeous, vaporous, and reverb-caressed, like the hushed, almost unbearable intimacy of pre-fame Cat Power."

Professional ratings
Review scores
Source	Rating
Spin	(8/10)

== Track listing ==
All tracks are written by A.A. Bondy.

No.	Title	Length
1.	"The Heart is Willing"	4:00
2.	"Down in the Fire (Lost Sea)"	4:35
3.	"Skull & Bones"	3:13
4.	"123 Dupuy Street"	1:10
5.	"Surfer King"	4:01
6.	"Hiway/Fevers"	4:50
7.	"Drmz"	3:26
8.	"The Twist"	4:20
9.	"Rte. 28/Believers"	6:59
10.	"Scenes from a Circus"	4:21

== Personnel ==
- A.A. Bondy - guitar, vocals
- Ben Lester - drums, piano, pedal steel
- Macey Taylor - bass
