= American Hearts =

Studio album by A.A. Bondy
- Released: September 18, 2007
- Recorded: January 2007
- Genres: Folk, Americana
- Length: 41:00
- Label: Superphonic Records / Fat Possum Records
- Producer: A.A. Bondy

A.A. Bondy chronology
American Hearts (2007)	When The Devil's Loose (2009)

Professional ratings
Review scores
Source	Rating
Pitchfork Media	(7.3/10)
Entertainment Weekly	B+

American Hearts is the first solo album by A.A. Bondy, released in 2007.

== Track listing ==
All tracks are written by A.A. Bondy and Band of Ghosts.

No.	Title	Length
1.	"How Will You Meet Your End?"	4:02
2.	"There's A Reason"	4:12
3.	"Black Rain, Black Rain"	3:14
4.	"Rapture (Sweet Rapture)"	3:20
5.	"American Hearts"	4:16
6.	"No Man Shall"	3:35
7.	"World Without End"	2:32
8.	"Lovers' Waltz"	3:27
9.	"Vice Rag"	2:03
10.	"Killed Myself When I Was Young"	3:50
11.	"Witness Blues"	3:13
12.	"Of The Sea"	3:21

"Killed Myself When I Was Young" by was featured in an episode of Season 4 of the television series Friday Night Lights and included on the Friday Night Lights Vol. 2 soundtrack

The song "World Without End" was featured in an episode of the 5th season of Friday Night Lights.

== Personnel ==
- A.A. Bondy - vocals and guitars

== Production ==
- Cover: detail from "History of America" by Ian Felice
- Photo and Layout: Clare Felice
