= Into the Pink =

Into The Pink

Studio album by Verbena
- Released: July 27, 1999
- Genre: Alternative rock, post-grunge
- Length: 39:59
- Label: Capitol
- Producer: Dave Grohl

Verbena chronology
Souls for Sale (1997)	Into The Pink (1999)	La Musica Negra (2003)

Into the Pink is the second album by the American rock band Verbena, released in 1999. It was their first release for Capitol Records. The album included the singles "Pretty Please" and "Baby Got Shot".

== Production ==
The album was produced by Dave Grohl. It was the band's first album as a trio, with Anne Marie Griffin changing from second guitar to bass guitar after the departure of the original bass guitarist.

== Critical reception ==
Professional ratings
Review scores
Source	Rating
Albuquerque Journal	2.5/4 stars
AllMusic	3/5 stars
Robert Christgau	(neither)
The Encyclopedia of Popular Music	4/5 stars
Pitchfork	6.0/10
Rolling Stone	3/5 stars

Rolling Stone called the album "skeletal rock with gravely roughed-up guitars." Entertainment Weekly wrote: "To make their potent retro cocktail, Verbena add a dash of Iggy Pop swagger and a measure of T. Rex power chords." The Stranger thought that "the distinctly crumbly crust of grunge is detectable among the sexy hot rock this time around." The Boston Globe declared that "Verbena's grimy guitar rock, as well as the potent vocal interplay between [AA] Bondy and bassist Anne Marie Griffin, still sounds as deadly as a rattlesnake."

== Track listing ==
All songs written by Scott Bondy and Verbena.

1. "Lovely Isn't Love" – 2:41
2. "Into the Pink" – 4:06
3. "Baby Got Shot" – 2:42
4. "John Beverly" – 3:51
5. "Pretty Please" – 2:51
6. "Monkey, I'm Your Man" – 2:38
7. "Prick the Sun" – 3:29
8. "Oh My" – 3:46
9. "Submissionary" – 2:26
10. "Bang Bang" – 2:39
11. "Depression Is a Fashion" – 1:52
12. "Sympathy Was Dead" – 2:51
13. "Big Skies, Black Rainbows" – 4:13

== Personnel ==
Verbena

- Scott Bondy – vocals and guitar
- Anne Marie Griffin – bass guitar and vocals
- Les Nuby – drums

Technical personnel

- Producer: Dave Grohl
- Engineer: Adam Kasper
- Mixing: Adam Kasper, Mike Cyr and Jack Joseph Puig
- Design: George Mimnaugh and Alan Narmore
- Photography: John Clark and Ken Schles
