= La Musica Negra =

2003 studio album by Verbena

Studio album by Verbena
- Released: May 20, 2003
- Genre: Rock, post-grunge, indie rock, alternative rock, Southern rock
- Length: 41:54
- Label: Capitol
- Producer: Rob Schnapf

Verbena chronology
Into The Pink (1999)	La Musica Negra (2003)

Professional ratings
Review scores
Source	Rating
Allmusic	2.5/5 stars
Rolling Stone	3/5 stars
Entertainment Weekly	B+

La Musica Negra is the third and final album by the rock band Verbena, released in 2003 on Capitol Records. Although the album marked yet another personnel change with longtime member Ann Marie Griffin succeeded by Nick Daviston on bass guitar, the album was dedicated to her in the liner notes.

== Track listing ==
All songs written by Scott Bondy except where noted.

1. "Way Out West" – 3:32 (Bondy and Les Nuby)
2. "Killing Floor (Get Down On It)" – 3:02
3. "I, Pistol" – 3:48
4. "It's Alright, It's Okay (Jesus Told Me So)" – 2:52
5. "All The Saints" – 3:19
6. "Camellia" – 4:06
7. "Me and Yr Sister" – 3:13
8. "White Grrls" – 3:28
9. "Ether" – 3:03
10. "Devil In Miss Jones" – 3:32
11. "Rememberer" – 4:17 (Bondy and Ed Buller)
12. "Dirty Goodbyes" – 3:47

== Personnel ==
- Scott Bondy – vocals and guitar
- Nick Daviston – bass guitar
- Les Nuby – drums
- Emily Kokal – backing vocals on "Camellia"
- Ambrosia Parsley – backing vocals on "Ether"

=== Production ===
- Producer: Rob Schnapf
- Engineer: Doug Boehm
- Mixing: Rob Schnapf and Doug Boehm
- Design: karissonwilker, inc.
- Photography: David Lisznia
