= When the Devil's Loose =

When The Devil's Loose

Studio album by A.A. Bondy
- Released: September 1, 2009
- Genre: Folk, Americana
- Label: Fat Possum Records
- Producer: A.A. Bondy

A.A. Bondy chronology
American Hearts (2007)	When The Devil's Loose (2009)	Believers (2011)

Professional ratings
Review scores
Source	Rating
Allmusic	3.5/5 stars
BBC Music	(positive)
Glide Magazine	4/5 stars
Pitchfork	6.6/10
Spin	4/5 stars
The Phoenix	3.5/5 stars

When the Devil's Loose is the second solo album by A.A. Bondy, released in 2009 (see 2009 in music).

== Track listing ==
All tracks are written by A.A. Bondy.

No.	Title	Length
1.	"Mightiest of Guns"	3:47
2.	"A Slow Parade"	4:57
3.	"When the Devil's Loose"	4:07
4.	"To the Morning"	3:38
5.	"Oh the Vampyre"	2:33
6.	"I Can See the Pines Are Dancing"	3:42
7.	"False River"	2:44
8.	"On the Moon"	3:28
9.	"The Mercy Wheel"	3:48
10.	"The Coal Hits the Fire"	4:14
11.	"Oh the Vampyre (Country Version)" (iTunes bonus track)	3:19
12.	"All Rise" (iTunes bonus track)	7:19

== Personnel ==
- A.A. Bondy – vocals and guitars
- Ian Felice – guitar
- Macey Taylor, Sr. – bass
- Greg Farley – violin
- Nick Kinsey – drums

== Production ==
- Producer: A.A. Bondy
- Engineer: Bruce Watson
- Mastering: Timothy Stollenwerk

== Charts ==
Chart (2009)	Peak position
U.S. Billboard Top Heatseekers	21
