= Shawn James (musician) =

American musician (born 1986)

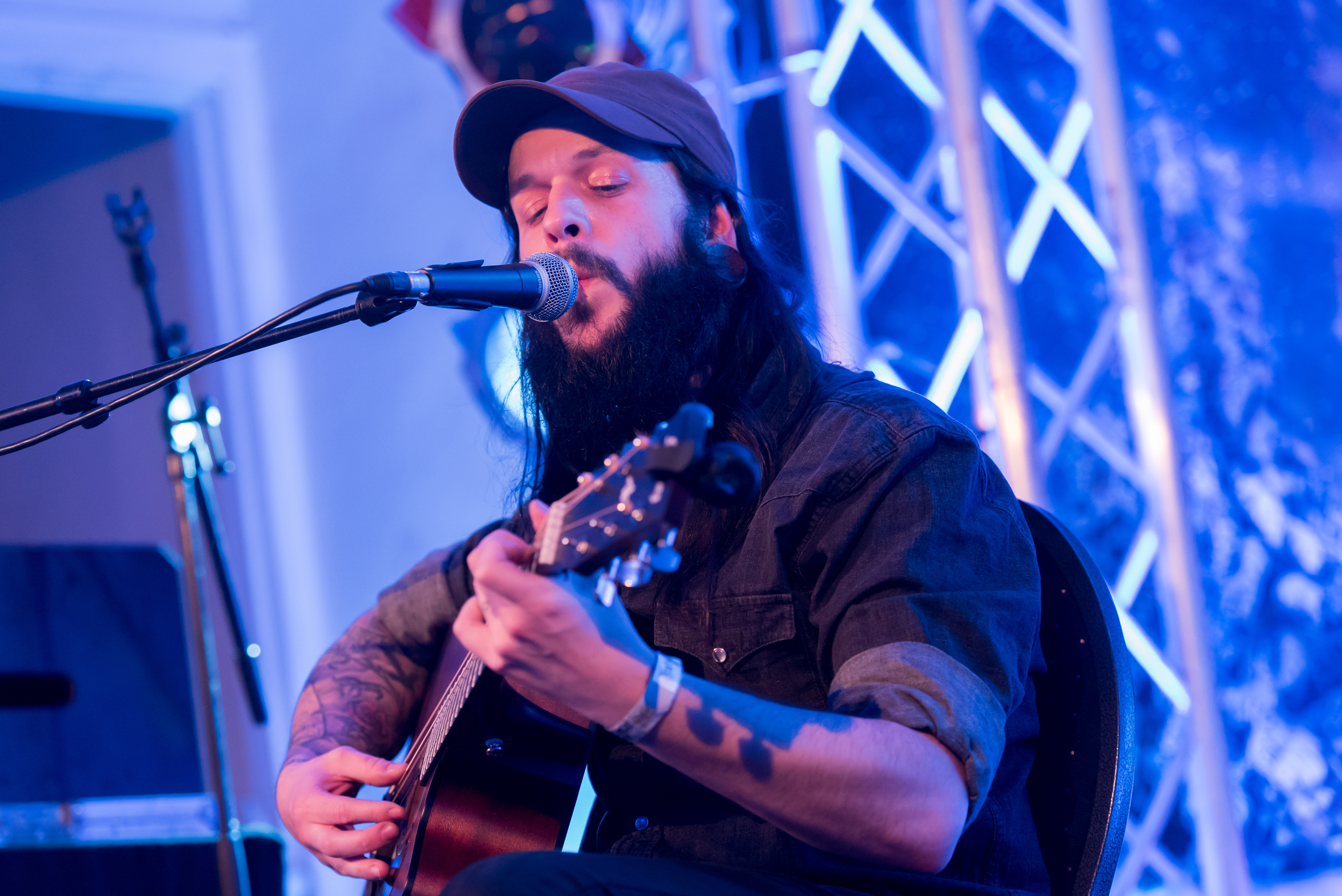
- James performing in February 2017

Background information
- Born: September 23, 1986 (age 40); Chicago, Illinois, U.S.
- Genres: Blues; folk; soul
- Occupations: Musician; singer; songwriter
- Instruments: Vocals; guitar; piano; drums
- Years active: 2012–present
- Labels: Parts + Labor; Raleigh Music Group
- Website: shawnjamesmusic.com

Shawn James (born September 23, 1986) is an American musician, singer, and songwriter. He performs both solo and with his backing band, The Shapeshifters.

== Early life ==
James was born in Chicago on September 23, 1986, and was raised by Greek immigrants on Chicago's South Side. As a child, he attended a local Pentecostal church, where he sang in the choir. His mother supported his singing as a kid. Later on also took opera, orchestra, and singing lessons in high school. Also in high school, he learned the guitar, piano, and trumpet. Over time, James also developed a talent for whistling, using it in 'Through the Valley' and 'The Guardian'.

== Career ==
James started his career working as a sound engineer at music studios in Nashville, Tennessee. In 2012, he moved to Fayetteville, Arkansas, to pursue his own career as a musician. In the beginning, he busked around downtown Fayetteville. From there, he started playing in local venues and recording his own songs in a bedroom studio. Later in 2012, he released his first studio album, Shadows. In 2013, he began working with his backing band, The Shapeshifters. He has since released three more solo albums, a live album, and five albums with The Shapeshifters. He also maintains his own record company, Shawn James Music. He achieved some notability in October 2015 when the music video for his cover of A. A. Bondy's "American Hearts", which was filmed in a wolf sanctuary, went viral after being posted on Reddit.

James had his biggest breakthrough in December 2016 when Ashley Johnson, the award-winning voice of Ellie, covered his 2012 song 'Through the Valley' in the reveal trailer for the 2020 video game, The Last of Us Part II. This led to the song topping Spotify's viral chart in the UK, eventually garnering over 60 million streams across Spotify, Apple Music, and YouTube. On June 5, 2020, he released a re-recorded version of the song in the run-up to the game's release two weeks later. The day before the game's release, a cover of the song by Australian musician Tash Sultana debuted on PlayStation Australia's YouTube channel, accompanied by a Last of Us Part II-themed music video. James' original recording of the song can briefly be heard playing on Ellie's headphones during the game's opening sequence. In 2025, Ashley Johnson's recording was featured in the final scenes of the episode "Through the Valley" from the second season of The Last of Us.

James' music has also been featured on Discovery Channel's reality show Yukon Men, the CBS legal drama series Reckless, and the Showtime comedy-drama series Shameless. He currently has a publishing deal with Raleigh Music Group, and signed to Parts + Labor Records in 2018. James’ cover of God’s Gonna Cut You Down was used in the season 1 finale of The Terminal List: Dark Wolf.

== Discography ==
=== Solo ===
- Shadows (2012)
- Deliverance (2014)
- On the Shoulders of Giants (2016)
- The Dark & The Light (2019)
- The Guardian Collection (2020)
- A Place in the Unknown (2022)
- Honor & Vengeance (2023)
- Passage (2026)

=== The Shapeshifters ===
- The Wolf (2013)
- The Bear (2013)
- The Hawk (2014)
- The Covers (2014)
- The Gospel According to Shawn James & The Shapeshifters (2015)
