= Friday Night Lights Vol. 2 =

Soundtrack album by Various Artists
- Released: May 4, 2010
- Genre: Soundtrack
- Label: Arrival Records/Scion Music Group
- Producers: Liza Richardson and Jonathan Platt

Friday Night Lights Vol. 2 is the second soundtrack for the NBC television series Friday Night Lights, a program inspired by the film of the same name. It was released by Arrival Records/Scion Music Group and is distributed by Fontana Distribution.

== Overview ==
The soundtrack consists of 12 songs featured on the television show, Friday Night Lights. It was released digitally on May 4, 2010 with the CD release following on May 18, 2010.

== Track listing ==
1. "Percussion Gun" - White Rabbits
2. "Sway" - Heartless Bastards
3. "Killed Myself When I Was Young" - A.A. Bondy
4. "Fire" - Augustana
5. "Something Good This Way Comes" - Jakob Dylan
6. "I Know What I Am" - Band of Skulls
7. "The Meanest Man In The World" - John Doe
8. "If It's The Beaches" - The Avett Brothers
9. "What You Hide" - AM
10. "Come Thou Fount of Every Blessing" - Sufjan Stevens
11. "This Is The Thing" - Fink
12. "Friday Night Lights Theme" - Snuffy Walden

== Music video ==
For the soundtrack's release, a new version of the music video for "Percussion Gun" by White Rabbits was made to incorporate footage from the fourth season of the show.
