= Music of The Last of Us (video game) =

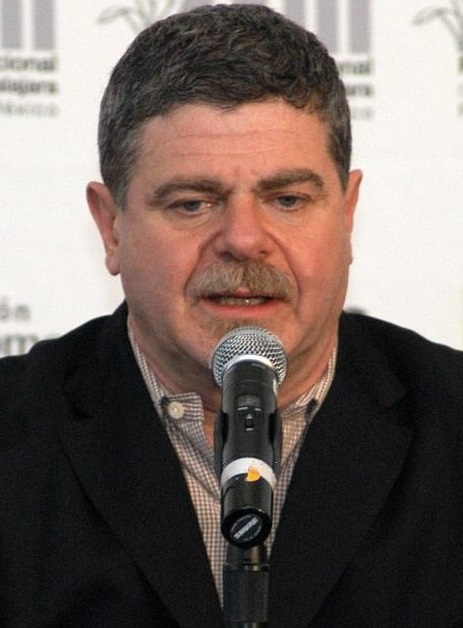
Argentine musician Gustavo Santaolalla composed the score for The Last of Us.

The music for the 2013 action-adventure survival horror video game The Last of Us, developed by Naughty Dog and published by Sony Computer Entertainment, was composed by Argentine musician Gustavo Santaolalla. Supplementary music for the game's downloadable content The Last of Us: Left Behind was composed by Santaolalla, Andrew Buresh, Anthony Caruso, and Jonathan Mayer. Both soundtracks were produced by Santaolalla, Mayer, and Aníbal Kerpel, with separate segments recorded in both Los Angeles and Nashville.

Santaolalla, known for his minimalist approach to composing, was excited to work on the soundtrack due to the game's focus on the characters and story. The directors were inspired by his work and sought him out early in the game's development. The musician began composing thereafter, with few instructions from the development team on the tone that they intended. In collaboration with each other, the team and Santaolalla aimed to make the soundtrack emotional, as opposed to scary. Santaolalla used various instruments to compose the score, including some that were unfamiliar to him.

The soundtrack album for The Last of Us was released on iTunes in June 2013. Additional compositions, including some composed for Left Behind, were released on a second soundtrack in February 2014. Critical reception to the soundtracks was positive, as reviewers felt that the music connected appropriately with the gameplay. In particular, critics felt that the minimalist approach of the soundtrack's composition matched the gameplay. The game's music was nominated for numerous awards. Several tracks became popular and begot cover versions and live performances.

== Production and composition ==
During the initial development of The Last of Us, creative director Neil Druckmann and game director Bruce Straley compiled musical tracks that they found inspirational. When searching for a composer to work on the game's music, they realised that Gustavo Santaolalla composed many of their compiled tracks; many employees were listeners of Santaolalla's soundtrack to The Motorcycle Diaries (2004). Straley described Santaolalla's music as "organic instrumentation, minimalist, dissonance and resonance with the sounds". The composer agreed to work on the game's soundtrack when contacted by Sony. Santaolalla was brought to the studio and was shown an early version of the game's first trailer and a full description of the game's plot; Druckmann remembers the composer's first words to them were "I want to be a part of this. Whatever it takes, I want to write for this". The composer had previously wanted to compose for video games and was approached by several other developers following his wins for Best Original Score at the Academy Awards, but he refused to work on projects without a focus on story and characters.

"I was approached by several companies to make music for video games. One company in Europe wanted me to work on a western video game that would have been a huge project – both financially and in terms of visibility and what it could represent. But it was more of the same, you know? I wanted to do something that connected what you do in the games with the heart – more than just the gymnastics, the shooting, the fighting, the surviving."

— Gustavo Santaolalla on deciding to compose the score for The Last of Us

Santaolalla began work on The Last of Us early in its development. Druckmann did not give him specific directions but offered him the game's stories and themes. Santaolalla appreciated this freedom and felt it assisted his process. He felt the need to "go into some more dark place, more textural and not necessarily melodic", when composing. The composer prefers to compose as he records, as he has little knowledge of reading and writing sheet music. To challenge himself, Santaolalla used a variety of unique instruments that were new to him, giving "an element of danger and innocence". For some tracks, he used a detuned guitar, producing deep noise. Santaolalla retrospectively realized he had composed a sonic contrast between the protagonists, with the Fender VI six-string bass guitar representing Joel and a ronroco representing Ellie. The title track was composed on the latter instrument.

To produce unique sounds, Santaolalla recorded in various rooms, including a bathroom and kitchen. The team wanted the game's AI to affect the music. They also tried to make the music evoke a reaction from the player, as their familiarization with the sounds would trigger a previous emotion that they felt. Music manager Jonathan Mayer felt that the game's action music was atypical for video game action music, stating that it is "relatively low-key", and that taking it out of context changes the immediate reaction to it. The game's theme, "The Last of Us", was the first piece of music that the team received, and they were very impressed. Santaolalla remembered that he sent Druckmann "batches of themes and music" for nearly three years, and was pleased that Druckmann was inspired by his music to write a new scene for the game. With the music, the team aimed to "get emotion", as opposed to "horror". Inspired by the sparing use of music in the film No Country for Old Men (2007), the team used music judiciously and tried to find other ways to "make your palms sweaty". Santaolalla said the team created a program that "moved" the stems of the music around depending on how long the player remained in a given area, ensuring the music was not repetitive. The orchestral portions of the score were recorded at Ocean Way Studios in Nashville by the Nashville Scoring Orchestra.

Aside from the official soundtracks, licensed tracks also appear in the game. In the main game, during the section titled "Alone and Forsaken", Joel and Ellie listen to the songs "I'll Never Get Out of This World Alive" and "Alone and Forsaken", both by Hank Williams. In the downloadable expansion pack The Last of Us: Left Behind, Ellie and Riley dance to the Etta James cover of the song "I Got You Babe". In addition, "String Quartet No. 3 in E-Flat Minor, Op. 30" by Pyotr Ilyich Tchaikovsky and "String Quartet No. 4 in E-Minor (B.19)" by Antonín Dvořák are also present in Left Behind.

== Albums ==
=== The Last of Us ===
The Last of Us

Soundtrack album by Gustavo Santaolalla
- Released: June 7, 2013
- Studio: Ocean Way, Nashville; EastWest, Hollywood
- Genre: Soundtrack
- Length: 55:31
- Label: Sony Computer Entertainment
- Producer: Gustavo Santaolalla; Aníbal Kerpel; Jonathan Mayer

The soundtrack for The Last of Us comprises songs from the game, composed and produced by Gustavo Santaolalla. The soundtrack spans thirty tracks, covering a duration of 56 minutes. Sony Computer Entertainment first published the album digitally via iTunes on June 7, 2013, and on CD on June 13, 2013. The soundtrack was also included as pre-order downloadable content in the Sights and Sounds Pack. It was released alongside Volume 2 in a vinyl record box set for the tenth anniversary in 2024.

"The Last of Us"
"The Last of Us", the game's main theme, was composed by Gustavo Santaolalla. Known for his minimalist approach to composing, he was contacted early in development to produce original music for the game.

The orchestral score, performed by the Nashville Scoring Orchestra, was recorded at Ocean Way Studios in Nashville, while the soundtrack's drums and percussion, performed by Santaolalla, M.B. Gordy, and Jonathan Mayer, was recorded at EastWest Studios in Hollywood. All recording was done by Mark Senasac and Aníbal Kerpel. The soundtrack was mastered by Tom Baker at Precision Mastering in Los Angeles.

In the United Kingdom, the album topped the Soundtrack Albums Chart in July 2024, having previously charted several times since its release. It simultaneously peaked at 33 on the Vinyl Albums Chart, 79 on the Physical Albums Chart, 84 on the Scottish Albums Chart, and 92 on the Albums Sales Chart. In France, it charted at 154 in December 2022.

All tracks are written by Gustavo Santaolalla.

No.	Title	Length
1.	"The Quarantine Zone (20 Years Later)"	3:40
2.	"The Hour"	1:02
3.	"The Last of Us"	3:04
4.	"Forgotten Memories"	1:08
5.	"The Outbreak"	1:32
6.	"Vanishing Grace"	2:06
7.	"The Hunters"	2:00
8.	"All Gone"	1:13
9.	"Vanishing Grace (Innocence)"	0:56
10.	"By Any Means"	1:53
11.	"The Choice"	1:42
12.	"Smugglers"	1:38
13.	"The Last of Us (Never Again)"	1:02
14.	"The Last of Us (Goodnight)"	0:51
15.	"I Know What You Are"	1:22
16.	"Home"	3:08
17.	"Infected"	1:16
18.	"All Gone (Aftermath)"	1:04
19.	"The Last of Us (A New Dawn)"	2:28
20.	"All Gone (No Escape)"	2:54
21.	"Vanishing Grace (Childhood)"	1:41
22.	"The Path"	1:29
23.	"All Gone (Alone)"	1:22
24.	"Blackout"	1:39
25.	"The Way It Was"	1:31
26.	"Breathless"	1:24
27.	"The Last of Us (You and Me)"	2:09
28.	"All Gone (The Outside)"	1:58
29.	"The Path (A New Beginning)"	2:47
30.	"Returning"	3:36
Total length:		55:35

=== The Last of Us Volume 2 ===
The Last of Us Volume 2

Soundtrack album by Gustavo Santaolalla
- Released: February 7, 2014
- Studio: Ocean Ways, Nashville; EastWest, Hollywood
- Genre: Soundtrack
- Length: 58:43
- Label: Sony Computer Entertainment
- Producer: Gustavo Santaolalla; Aníbal Kerpel; Jonathan Mayer

The Last of Us Volume 2, the soundtrack for the downloadable content The Last of Us: Left Behind, features compositions from the game, composed and produced by Gustavo Santaolalla. It also features works from Andrew Buresh, Anthony Caruso, and Jonathan Mayer, as well as some additional tracks from the main game. The soundtrack spans 25 tracks, covering a duration of 58 minutes. Sony Computer Entertainment first published the album on iTunes and Amazon Music on February 7, 2014, one week prior to the release of Left Behind.

"Left Behind"
"Left Behind" was composed by Gustavo Santaolalla as the main theme for The Last of Us: Left Behind.

The recording and mastering of the soundtrack took place in the same locations as the first album. The orchestral score, performed by the Nashville Scoring Orchestra, was recorded at Ocean Way Studios in Nashville, while the soundtrack's drums and percussion, performed by Gordy, Santaolalla, and Mayer, was recorded at EastWest Studios in Hollywood. All recording and mixing was completed by Aníbal Kerpel, with additional mixing by Mark Senasac, Joel Yarger, Mayer, and Caruso. The soundtrack was mastered by Marc Senasac at PlayStation Recording Studios.

No.	Title	Music	Length
1.	"Fleeting"	Gustavo Santaolalla	3:00
2.	"All Gone (Seasons)"	Santaolalla	2:00
3.	"Evasion"	Andrew Buresh	1:20
4.	"All Gone (Partners)"	Santaolalla	2:17
5.	"Cause and Effect"	JD Mayer	2:15
6.	"All Gone (Reunion)"	Santaolalla	1:48
7.	"Stalking"	Santaolalla	1:59
8.	"Left Behind (Together)"	Santaolalla	2:43
9.	"The Capitol"	Anthony Caruso	3:21
10.	"Head Rush"	Santaolalla	3:26
11.	"Wandering"	Santaolalla	2:07
12.	"All Gone (Overcome)"	Santaolalla	1:53
13.	"Unstable"	Santaolalla	1:51
14.	"The Last of Us (Astray)"	Santaolalla	3:29
15.	"Answers"	Mayer	1:15
16.	"Drawn In"	Santaolalla	1:10
17.	"Apprehension"	Mayer	1:33
18.	"The Path (Vacant)"	Santaolalla	2:59
19.	"Convergence"	Mayer	2:50
20.	"Shadows"	Santaolalla	0:59
21.	"No Mercy"	Santaolalla	2:34
22.	"Fleeting (Affection)"	Santaolalla	1:48
23.	"Extinction"	Buresh	1:56
24.	"Consumed"	Caruso, Mayer	4:15
25.	"Left Behind"	Santaolalla	3:55
Total length:			58:43

== Reception ==
In the context of the game, the soundtrack was well received. Computer and Video Games's Andy Kelly called it "sparse and delicate". Eurogamer's Oli Welsh felt it complemented the game's environments, and Destructoid's James Stephanie Sterling felt it complemented gameplay. Game Informer's Matt Helgeson considered it "understated and haunting". Game Revolution's Keri Honea felt the album could be enjoyed outside of the context of the game, praising its unusual tracks and sound. The Guardian's Dom Peppiatt wrote that "the pads of [Santaolalla's] fingers audibly scuffing and scratching on the strings" complemented the game's themes of humanity, and his Argentine brand of Americana was "dreamily familiar" yet distinct from United States musical sensibilities. GameSpot's Tom Mc Shea named the music one of the game's standout features, praising its addition during emotional scenes. AllMusic's Thom Jurek praised the album's variety and felt Santaolalla could "draw in and keep the attention of the listener".

In the context of Left Behind, the soundtrack was generally well received. Mike Futter of Game Informer felt that the soundtrack improves the game. Adnan Riaz of Nouse echoed similar remarks, stating that the soundtrack accompanies some of the game's "crucial moments", and that it "builds the atmosphere for the exchanges" between the characters.

== Legacy ==
The Last of Us won Excellence in Musical Score at the 2014 SXSW Gaming Awards, and the soundtrack received nominations at the 10th British Academy Video Games Awards and Spike VGX 2013, and from Hardcore Gamer, IGN, and GameTrailers. The game's main theme was performed live at the 2012 Spike Video Game Awards in Culver City, California, on December 7, 2012. Music from The Last of Us was also performed live at The Last of Us: One Night Live in Santa Monica, California, on July 28, 2014. The event featured scenes from the game performed live by the actors, accompanied by the game's score, performed by Santaolalla and his band. The popularity of the game has led to numerous cover versions of the music being released by various artists, such as violinist Taylor Davis. Santaolalla adapted his music for the television adaptation of The Last of Us, which premiered in January 2023. In June, he performed music from the game at the Hollywood Bowl as part of The Game Awards 10-Year Concert. Music from the series was covered by the orchestra London Music Works in a 2026 album.
