= A. A. Bondy =

American alternative folk artist

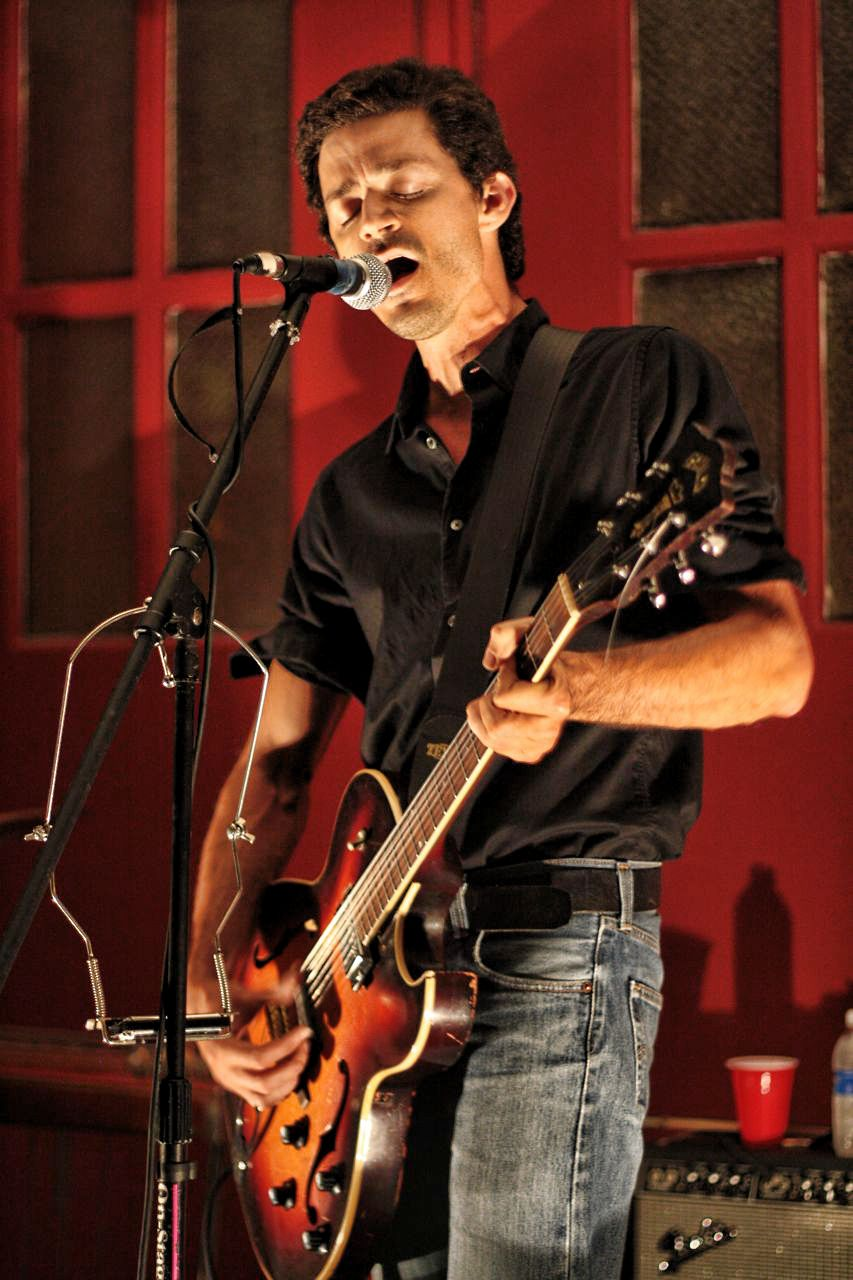
- Bondy performing at an L.A. firehouse, 2010

Background information
- Also known as: Scott Bondy
- Born: Auguste Arthur Bondy IV; New Roads, Louisiana, U.S.
- Origin: Verbena, Alabama, U.S.
- Genres: Folk music, rock, country
- Occupations: Musician, singer-songwriter
- Instruments: Guitar, vocals, harmonica, piano
- Years active: 1990–present
- Label: Fat Possum Merge Capitol
- Formerly of: Verbena

Auguste Arthur Bondy IV, also known as Scott Bondy and A. A. Bondy, is an American alternative folk artist from Birmingham, Alabama.

== Early life ==
Bondy was born in New Roads, Louisiana and raised in Verbena, Alabama, outside of Birmingham, where he attended Verbena High School.

== Career ==
Bondy is the former lead singer and guitarist in the rock band Verbena, which he founded in the early-1990s. After the band broke up in 2003, he recorded many demos and sessions, and his debut solo album, American Hearts, in a barn near his home in Palenville, New York. The album, released in 2007, marked a shift in musical direction towards a more traditional and minimalist folk sound, with Bondy playing mostly acoustic guitar and harmonica.

His second album, When the Devil's Loose, was recorded in Water Valley, Mississippi and released in September 2009.

Bondy released his third album, Believers, on September 13, 2011.

Bondy released his fourth album, Enderness, on May 10, 2019.

== Discography ==
=== Albums ===
- American Hearts (2007)
- When the Devil's Loose (2009)
- Believers (2011)
- Enderness (2019)

=== In media ===
- "Killed Myself When I Was Young" was featured in season four of the television series Friday Night Lights and was included on the Friday Night Lights Vol. 2 soundtrack.
- "A Slow Parade" was featured in season six of the television series House.
- "Mightiest of Guns" was featured on season three of the Australian television series Packed to the Rafters.
- "When The Devil's Loose" was featured in "The Tough Man in the Tender Chicken", an episode of the series Bones.
- "There's A Reason" and "False River" were featured in the television show One Tree Hill.
- "World Without End" was featured in season three of the television series Covert Affairs.
- "Skull & Bones" was featured in season four of the television series Shameless.
- "The Heart Is Willing" was sampled at the beginning of season 3, episode 10 of Preacher.
- He did a cover of Johnny Has Gone for a Soldier that was featured on various artists' Divided & United (Disc 2 Track 13) in 2013.
