= Day One (The Last of Us) =

- The Last of Us episode
- Ellie serenades Dina on guitar. The scene, important to the creators, closely resembles the game's version. The cinematography, lighting, and performances were praised.
- Episode no.: Season 2 Episode 4
- Directed by: Kate Herron
- Written by: Craig Mazin
- Cinematography by: Catherine Goldschmidt
- Editing by: Emily Mendez
- Original air date: May 4, 2025
- Running time: 53 minutes

Guest appearances
- Jeffrey Wright as Isaac Dixon; Alanna Ubach as Hanrahan; Josh Peck as Janowicz; Ben Ahlers as Burton

Episode chronology
← Previous "The Path"	Next → "Feel Her Love"
- The Last of Us season 2

"Day One" is the fourth episode of the second season of the American post-apocalyptic drama television series The Last of Us. Written by series co-creator Craig Mazin and directed by Kate Herron, it aired on HBO on May 4, 2025. The episode follows Ellie (Bella Ramsey) and Dina (Isabela Merced) in Seattle as they search for Abby, a member of the Washington Liberation Front (WLF) who killed Joel. It introduces WLF leader Isaac (Jeffrey Wright), who joined the group after defecting from the Federal Disaster Response Agency.

The episode adapts and expands upon several scenes from The Last of Us Part II (2020), the video game on which the season is based. Ellie's performance of A-ha's "Take On Me" was adapted directly; Mazin and Herron considered it among the most important scenes. Similar importance was placed upon Ellie and Dina's intimacy scenes, which occurred earlier in the game. Critics praised the direction, cinematography, writing, action sequences, and Merced and Wright's performances; the latter was nominated for Guest Actor in a Drama Series at the 77th Primetime Creative Arts Emmy Awards. The episode had 774,000 viewers on linear television.

== Plot ==
In 2018, Federal Disaster Response Agency (FEDRA) sergeant Isaac Dixon chastises his team for mocking civilians they have harassed. They encounter a Washington Liberation Front (WLF) group led by Hanrahan. Isaac kills his squad, only sparing the idealistic Burton, and reveals his allegiance to the WLF. Eleven years later, Isaac, now the WLF's leader, interrogates Malcolm—a member of the Seraphites, a religious group in Seattle—for his group's location while torturing him with a heated pan. After realizing the Seraphite would rather be tortured than share the truth, he shoots him dead. Burton, standing guard outside with another WLF member, says he deserved it.

Ellie and Dina begin their first day exploring Seattle in their search for Abby, with Dina covertly taking a pregnancy test. In Capitol Hill, the two stumble upon the aftermath of conflicts between FEDRA and the WLF. Deciding to advance by night, they decide to hide out in a music store where Ellie discovers a guitar and serenades Dina with A-ha's song "Take On Me".

While proceeding through a former television station that night, they encounter the bodies of several WLF soldiers brutally disemboweled by the Seraphites, causing Dina to vomit again. Evading an incoming WLF squad, Ellie and Dina escape through the subway, where the WLF squad unintentionally attracts the infected and is killed. Ellie allows an infected to bite her arm to save Dina before they escape to an abandoned theater together. A heartbroken Dina prepares to shoot Ellie, but Ellie reveals her immunity and offers to sleep in isolation to prove that she will not turn.

Once it is clear to Dina that Ellie is immune, Dina confesses that she is pregnant. Fueled by their emotional intensity, the two have sex for the first time, finally consummating their feelings for one another. The next morning, Dina admits that Jesse fathered her baby, but shares that she wants a future and a family together with Ellie, who reciprocates the sentiment. The two overhear chatter on a walkie-talkie that the WLF—including Abby's friend Nora—are based at the Lakehill hospital. Ellie suggests Dina stay behind and protect her pregnancy, but Dina insists on going forward with Ellie.

== Production ==
=== Conception and writing ===
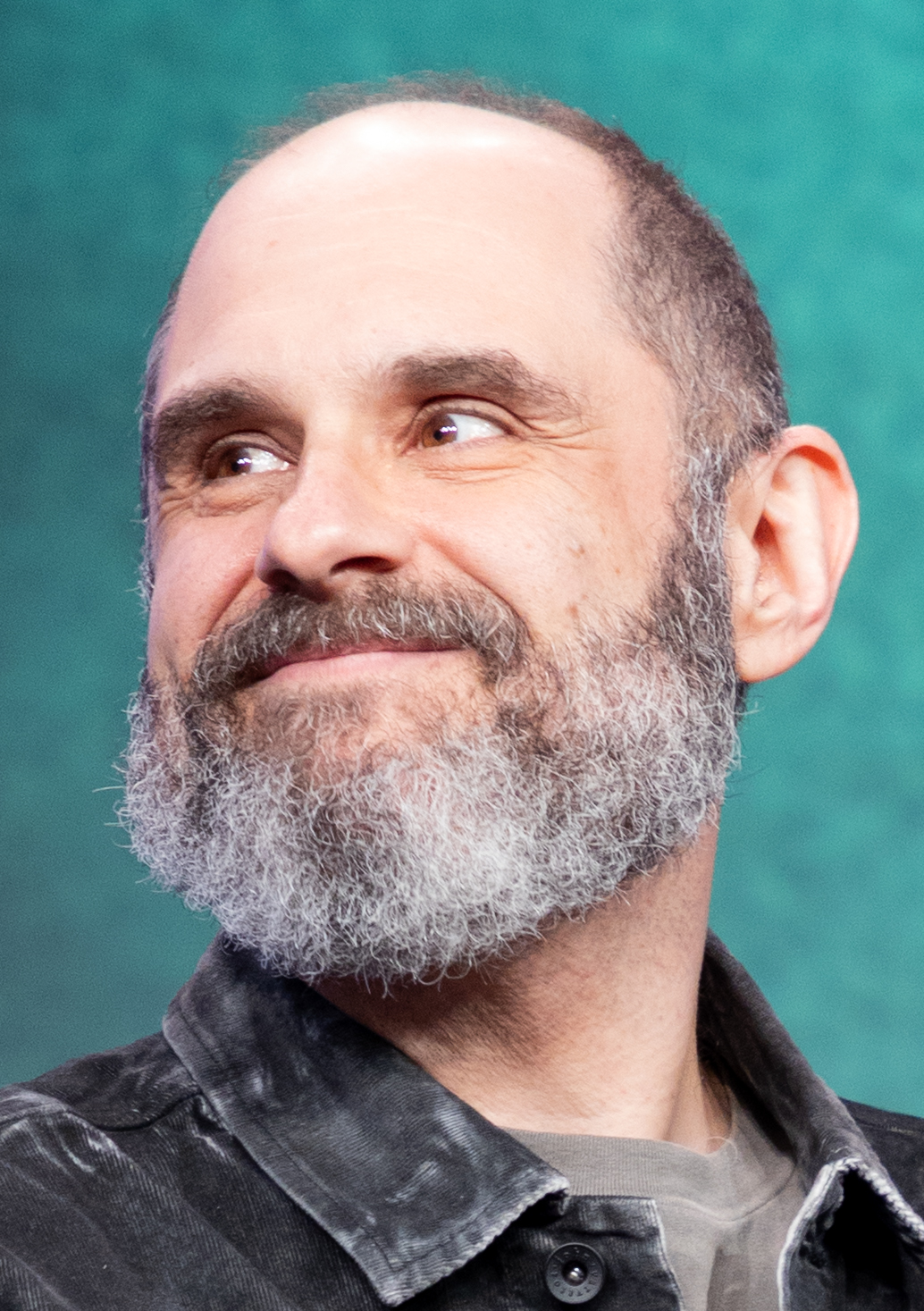
"Day One" was written by series co-creator Craig Mazin.

"Day One" was written by The Last of Us series co-creator Craig Mazin and directed by Kate Herron. A fan of the games on which the series is based, having played them during COVID-19 lockdowns, Herron reached out to the showrunners in hopes of working on an episode. Eben Bolter, her friend who worked as a director of photography on the first season, "put a good word in" for her. Herron was excited to speak with Neil Druckmann, the co-showrunner who co-directed and co-wrote the games, even if she did not secure the job; she considered dressing as Ellie for her Zoom meeting. She spoke with Mazin and Druckmann about her love for the games and series, and they later asked her to direct an episode. Herron thought they assigned her "Day One" because she talked "a lot about Ellie and Dina"; she felt their relationship was the episode's "guiding light". She enjoyed the tonal shifts, such as the discussion of pride flags immediately before encountering the burned-out tank. She compared the tonal shifts to a music scale, feeling some scenes built up to others—like the Capitol Hill scenes to the music store, and the television station to the subway—while others reset the tone entirely, such as Isaac's interrogation sequence.

The episode's opening with FEDRA soldiers was inspired by environmental storytelling in The Last of Us Part II (2020), the game on which the second season is based; the player can discover a burned-out tank and notes revealing that some FEDRA soldiers began deserting. Herron felt that focusing on Burton, a new recruit who asks questions, could help the audience learn the soldiers' dynamics. The writers were intrigued by the similarities between Ellie and the Seraphites, with both attempting to respect and protect deceased figures: Ellie with Joel, and the Seraphites with their Prophet. Druckmann felt that with the passage of time since their deaths, the deceased evolved from being real people into more of an idea. The television station scenes were inspired by the game's stealth gameplay, which Mazin partly wanted to replicate; he showed production designer Don Macauley the in-game location as a reference before the set was built. Herron felt the nighttime setting, instead of daytime like in the game, was more frightening and intimidating. She largely planned the scene independently as the crew was working on "Through the Valley". Mazin had intentionally added references to Ellie's love of space and astronauts in the first season (like mentioning Sally Ride in "Kin") to set up the second season; in "Day One", she mentions the fate of the Apollo 1 astronauts to Dina.

The Capitol Hill scenes were adapted closely from the game, in which they are optional; Druckmann was interested to discover which ones Mazin would include. They considered the music store scene especially important; it was one of Herron's favorite from the game, and she sought to make it feel "safe" rather than frightening for viewers. Ellie's performance of "Take On Me" matches the scene in the game. Druckmann sent a clip of it during filming to A-ha guitarist Paul Waaktaar-Savoy, who was moved. Mazin thought the inclusion of the song was justified by narrative events: Dina falls in love with Ellie as she performs. Herron found the scene among the most intimidating to film, and Mazin was nervous as he felt it was one of the most meaningful to many people. He thought the scene matched the game's version in some ways while still remaining unique in others, such as the context of Ellie and Dina's relationship; by the time it took place in the game, they were already a couple. For Herron, playing a song for one's crush made the scene relatable to viewers. She filmed several different takes, including some where Ellie avoided eye contact and Dina was "really into the song", to allow the best version to be selected during editing. Mazin approved Herron's request to add a caterpillar in the background, which she felt reflected his willingness to collaborate.

The scene in which Ellie reveals her immunity was altered to delay Dina's belief due to the series's use of tendrils instead of spores (the vector through which infection is spread in the games). Mazin considered the scene an enjoyable exercise in writing and acting, likening it to defusing a bomb. Herron found it challenging to balance the trust levels of both characters, requiring several takes. Ellie's decision to isolate herself from Dina to prove her immunity was based on Joel and Tess's similar treatment of Ellie in "Infected". Herron wanted the scene to maintain tension until the moment Ellie and Dina kiss, making it feel earned and "like a relief, but also enough of a surprise". Their sex scene was different in the game, taking place much earlier in Jackson, and the writers' decision to move it to Seattle prompted other changes in earlier episodes. Herron appreciated the change, considering it more impactful and logical considering the series's episodic nature, but wondered if fans of the game would accept it. Mazin felt the more fearful state of LGBTQ rights in 2003—when the outbreak occurs in the series—meant Dina was scared to reveal herself to Ellie. Herron, who came out as bisexual in her 30s, found Dina's coming out "very relatable and beautiful" and wanted to portray it authentically, hoping viewers would realize they are not alone. She considered Ellie and Dina's relationship relatable, particularly in their mutual hesitancy.

=== Casting and characters ===
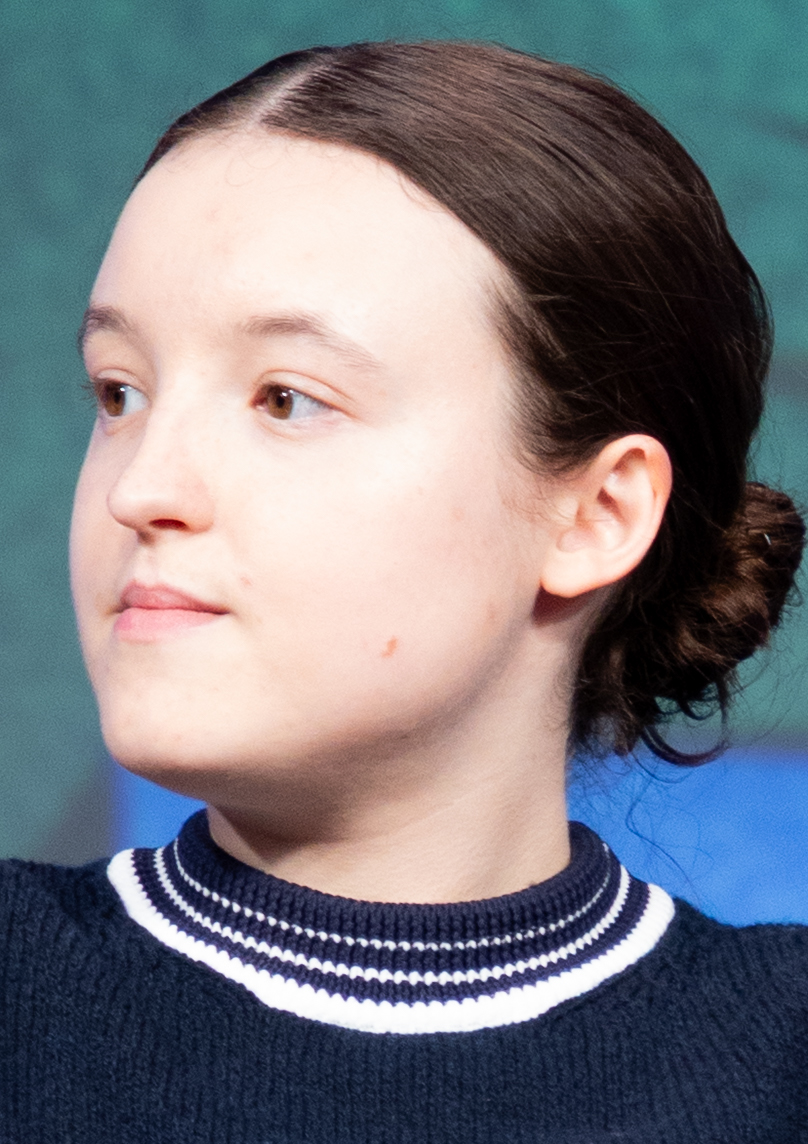
Bella Ramsey was asked to tone down their guitar performance to make Ellie appear less experienced.

During the performance of "Take On Me", Bella Ramsey (who portrays Ellie) was asked to "tone it down" and perform "worse" to make Ellie sound "more like a regular person picking up a guitar" rather than an experienced player like Ramsey. They took lessons to learn the song and felt their vocal performance—they are experienced with "more choral and operatic-like singing"—reflected Ellie's shyness during the scene. They were more nervous about the scene than their stunt work due to the character's vulnerability. Isabela Merced (Dina) had not intended for the character to become emotional during the music store scene, but she cried due the "stunning" set and Ramsey's "angelic and pure" voice; even when Herron asked her not to cry, Merced struggled to remain composed. She felt Dina was emotional due to her love for Ellie and Joel, as well as her fear about her pregnancy and her romantic connection with Ellie. She performed the scene as if it was the moment Dina fell in love with Ellie. Both actors had earpieces during the scene, which frequently malfunctioned.

As a queer woman, Merced understood Dina's hesitancy to come out. She attributed the scene's authenticity to Halley Gross for her work on both the game and series. Merced and Ramsey improvised some moments based on their mutual comfort, like adding additional kisses. Merced wanted viewers to believe that Dina "could potentially shoot Ellie in the face" and feel conflicted about it. She "went to a really dark place" to understand Dina's internal conflict and found the scene difficult to film, citing the wet weather and the gun's weight, but felt they contributed to its authenticity. Merced appreciated the scene's uniqueness as it occurred differently in the games, and found it paralleled Ellie and Riley's scenes in the first-season episode "Left Behind". She was nervous about the "emotionally charged" scene wherein Dina reveals her pregnancy but was comforted that the cinematography mostly conceals her face; it gave her an opportunity to "hype [herself] up, and really just feel anxious". Regarding Dina's decision to continue despite her pregnancy, Merced considered her own mother, thinking "if she were able to somehow secure the safety of others and herself and her baby, nothing would really stop her".

Jeffrey Wright's casting as Isaac was announced on May 24, 2024; he reprises his role from The Last of Us Part II, the second actor to do so after Merle Dandridge as Marlene. Druckmann felt Wright's casting was logical as he is the correct age and appearance for Isaac. Herron wanted to support Wright's performance rather than dictate it as he was familiar with the character. The series explores more of Isaac's backstory than the game as the writers were not restricted to the perspective of the player characters. Mazin told Druckmann about his idea for Isaac's introduction (the interrogation scene) while driving around; he wrote it like a play. He was interested in the idea that characters like Isaac had ordinary pre-apocalypse lives, despite their chaotic present-day behaviors, prompting the inclusion of Isaac's speech about his love of cooking for his dates. Mazin wanted to communicate that Isaac had rehearsed the speech, having performed it while torturing others beforehand. Wright did not believe Isaac betrayed FEDRA, but rather that the agency betrayed him by abandoning its ethics. The WLF members Hanrahan and Burton were portrayed by Alanna Ubach and Ben Ahlers, respectively; their casting was announced on March 5, 2025. Herron wanted to capture that Burton is "hollowed out" in the present-day scenes.

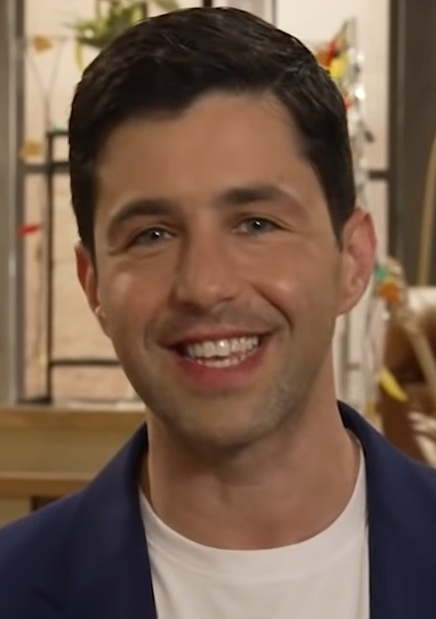
Josh Peck's role in the episode was not announced before it aired.

Josh Peck, who portrays Janowicz, had previously been mentioned in conversations about the series's casting. He watched the first season after securing the audition, which made him feel prepared after reading his scene. He read Janowicz's monologue for his audition, and considered it more interesting than typical audition lines. Peck secured the role about 2–3 weeks later, and filmed the following month. He felt the casting came "down to flavor and a look", noting the role could have been played by many other actors. Herron considered him "the best person" for the role and compared it to Drew Barrymore's role in the opening of Scream (1996). Peck related to Janowicz's enthusiasm to retell a favorite story to his friends, and felt removing the additional context of the post-apocalyptic world allowed him to personalize the character. He filmed for two days: the first on a street in Vancouver, and the second on a soundstage. Peck's casting was not announced before the episode aired, surprising many journalists, who described his appearance as a cameo.

=== Filming ===
Production for the episode began around April 2024. Catherine Goldschmidt worked as the director of photography. Kathy Kadler, an intimacy coordinator, was present during production for the sex and interrogation scenes; Ryan Masson, who portrayed Malcolm, was naked in the latter. The music store scene, filmed in a studio, was Herron's first day of production and Druckmann's first day on set for the season, during which he showed Pearl Jam guitarist Mike McCready around. The set was designed and lit similar to the games; Herron and Goldschmidt referenced in-game screenshots, the latter wanting it to "feel really beautiful, really romantic". Herron focused on small elements described in the script, such as the production design detail in the store and close-up shots of instruments, wanting it to "feel like a haven" for the characters. She considered it important to capture views of Seattle as she was impressed with the area in the game. Filming occurred in Vancouver's Downtown Eastside—replicating Seattle—with soldiers and military vehicles on May 4, and with Ramsey and Merced on horseback on May 11; production was planned late, with some businesses given four days' notice. The military vehicle's walls were removeable to allow for better camera angles.

Preparatory production work began in Nanaimo on April 22, with road closures around Diana Krall Plaza from April 29. Around six minutes of footage was filmed from May 13–14, featuring Ramsey and Merced on horseback in Capitol Hill. Ramsey met the city's mayor, Leonard Krog. The horse, named Jazzway, was previously featured in the television series The 100 (2014–2020) and the film Jurassic World Dominion (2022). The greens department redressed Commercial Street, which Goldschmidt felt added reality to the scene. Several businesses were closed during filming and compensated by the production, and some surrounding stores saw an increase in shoppers and online traffic, with the city's economy receiving a boost. The crew vacated Nanaimo by May 31, and the city was set to be gifted for its involvement in the series. Filming took place in Chinatown, Vancouver, on July 8, with Ramsey, Merced, and the fictional Seraphites in a recreation of Seattle.

The subway sequence was among the first storyboarded by Herron. It was filmed in a former paper mill found by Macauley and location manager Nicole Chartrand; its railroad tracks were used to transport products. Macauley and his team converted the location into a metro tunnel, including with real train cars; six Mark I model SkyTrain cars were purchased from TransLink in early 2024 and rebranded to represent Seattle. The stunt performers viewed the cars during pre-production to plan their movements. Herron planned the scene intensely with Goldschmidt, particularly due to the intense stunt work. Goldschmidt tested several ideas, ultimately laying the arm of a Filmotechnic Technoscope F27 camera crane on one of the train cars to film the interior while A-camera operator Robin Smith filmed handheld shots. Special effects supervisor Joel Whist added hydraulic levers to rock the train cars. The scene was considered a reference to the game rather than a direct imitation. It was the result of several meetings for each element, including prosthetics and safety; Mazin considered it dangerous to film, citing the camera operator's rig suspending them in the air.

The subway's red lighting was adapted from the game, established by art director John Sweeney to signify danger to the player; Mazin and Herron considered it important to incorporate and never considered omitting it. Real flares were used for testing, with several tools used to mimic their lighting; their intensity and flicker could be controlled manually. Following Mazin's brief, Goldschmidt wanted the scene to "balance between not being able to see too much, but being able to see enough", with the thought of more infected amplifying their threat. The visual effects team increased size of the horde, though Goldschmidt felt the intensity was achieved through lighting and darkness rather than sheer numbers. Herron requested the addition of a clicker jump scare in the scene, testing it in pre-production with the previsualization artist, which Mazin approved. She wanted to capture the intense mood game's scene. Merced felt she bonded with Ramsey the most during the scene due to the closeness and intensity. She recalled the set "smelled like shit" as the manure used for decorating dirt had not been sufficiently prepared in time. In the television station, the hanging bodies were played by stunt performers in harnesses.

== Reception ==
=== Broadcast and ratings ===
The episode aired on HBO on May 4, 2025. On linear television, the episode had 774,000 viewers, with a 0.20 ratings share. The series was the most-viewed across all streaming services for the following week, and the seventh-most-viewed for overall watch time, with 738 million minutes streamed on Max. It was the most in-demand show in Canada, with more than 67 times the average television demand the preceding week and more than 59 times the following week.

=== Critical response ===
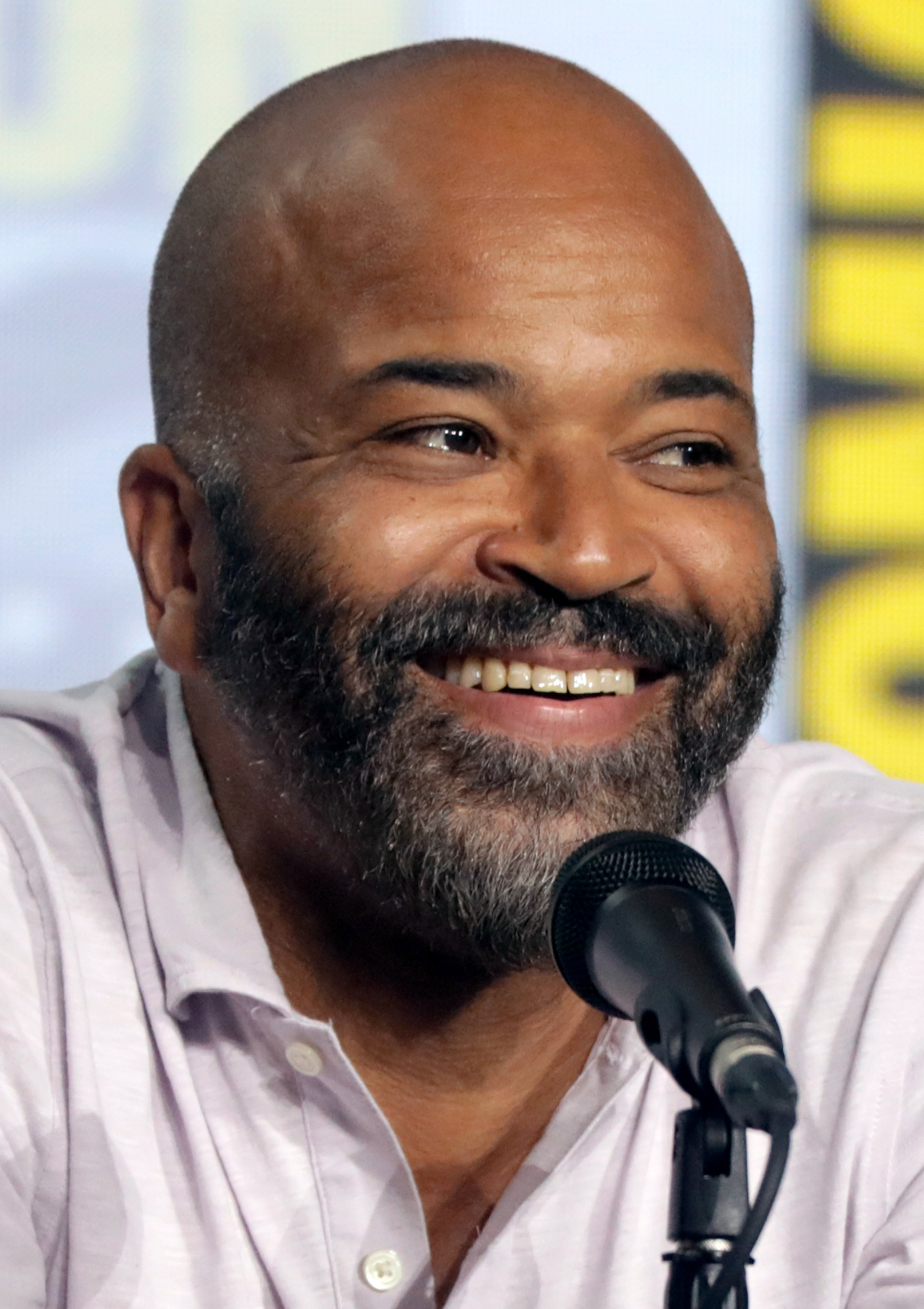
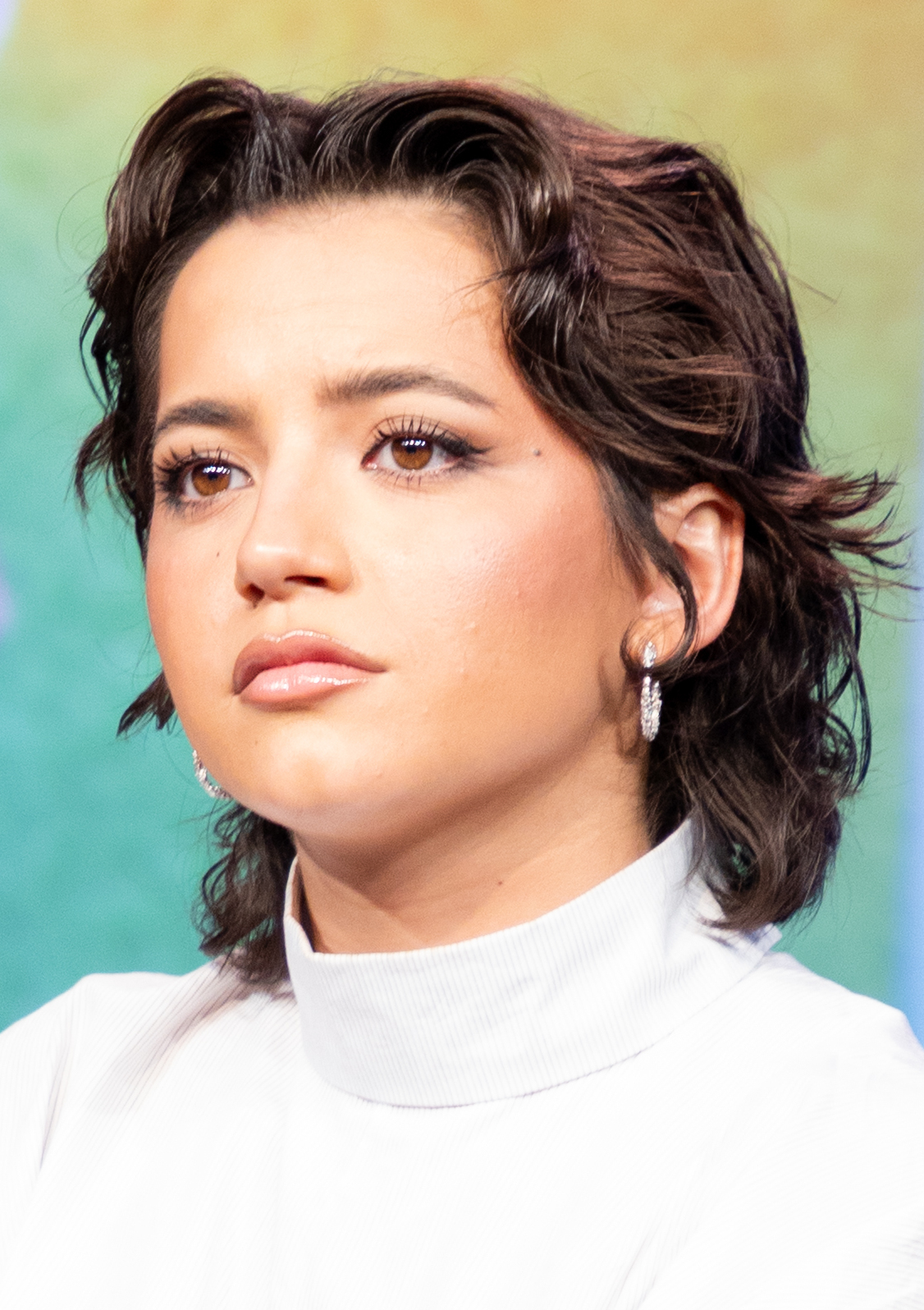
Critics praised the performances of Jeffrey Wright (left) and Isabela Merced (right), and the former was nominated for Guest Actor at the Emmy Awards.

"Day One" has an approval rating of 100% on review aggregator Rotten Tomatoes based on 22 reviews, with a 7.9/10 average rating. The website's critical consensus noted the episode is "catapulted by wondrous performances and [sets] its tone with intrigue and violence". IGN's Simon Cardy and Kotaku's Kenneth Shepard considered it the season's best episode to date. Reviewers lauded Herron's delivery of action sequences and quieter moments; The A.V. Club's Caroline Siede praised her ability to draw strong performances. The chase scene was praised for its intensity and ominous lighting; TheWrap's Alex Welch considered it the season's—and possibly the series's—best action sequence, and Esquire's Brady Langmann called it "one of the best video-game adaptation moments". Rolling Stone's Alan Sepinwall found it more intense than the second episode's action due to its focus on lead characters. Several critics praised the music store's cinematography and lighting; IGN's Cardy called it "an embodiment of hope growing out of all of this devastation". The episode was nominated for Outstanding Contemporary Makeup (Non-Prosthetic) (Note: Nominees: department head makeup artist Rebecca Lee; key makeup artists Krystal Devlin, Amber Trudeau, and Leslie Graham; and 1st makeup Jessica Wong and Chelsea Matthews) and Outstanding Production Design for a Narrative Contemporary Program (Note: Nominees: production designer Don Macaulay; supervising art director David Clarke; and set decorators Jonathan Lancaster and Lisa Lancaster) at the Creative Arts Emmy Awards.

Critics praised Wright's performance for his captivating and menacing nature and were drawn in by his unsettling charisma. CBR's Katie Doll felt he "takes the spotlight", particularly in his calm and commanding presence during the interrogation scene, and TheWrap's Welch suspected Wright's talents were introduced to account for the departure of Pedro Pascal. Wright was nominated for Guest Actor in a Drama Series at the Creative Arts Emmy Awards. Rolling Stone's Sepinwall enjoyed Wright's performance but found the character "an extremely trope-y case of a villain", particularly in his monologue. IndieWire's Ben Travers recognized Isaac's use of cooking utensils as torture reflected a recurring theme in the series: turning "a gesture of love ... into a weapon of hate". Several reviewers lauded Merced's performance; The A.V. Club's Siede found her reaction to Ellie's song "kind of took my breath away" and granted deeper connection with the character, and Entertainment Weekly's Sara Netzley wrote she "delivered each [emotion] with deft nuance that never quite dimmed Dina's usual joie de vivre". Ramsey's performance of "Take On Me" was lauded for its understated nature. The A.V. Club's Siede called Peck "well-deployed" in his role, though Esquire's Langman found his appearance distracting.

Collider's Ross Bonaime praised Mazin's script for balancing beauty and horror, particularly in the music store and interrogation scenes, respectively. IGN's Cardy felt Ellie's musical performance "turns an optional character moment in the game into one that feels so crucial to the show", and Elle's Lauren Puckett-Pope found it a powerful moment of peace, though she preferred the in-game rendition. Rolling Stone's Sepinwall thought the series was at its strongest when focusing on Ellie and Dina, and Entertainment Weekly's Netzley felt their revelations of their immunity and pregnancy were more emotionally effective than in the game. Conversely, TheWrap's Welch wrote Dina's coming out scene "carries serious YA romance vibes" and found her insistence on eating beef jerky to hide their morning breath "feels like the kind of beat that ... Mazin intends to be cute but instead just comes off as cringey". Some critics and viewers criticized Ellie's reaction to Dina's pregnancy, finding it an abrupt tonal shift and emblematic of Ellie's immature characterization in contrast to the game. Several reviewers considered the interrogation scene one of the season's strongest, particularly for its insight into Isaac's behavior, though The A.V. Club's Siede thought it was derivative of other apocalyptic media and Kotaku's Shepard found the intercut shots of Burton too heavy-handed in spelling out the scene's impact to the audience.
