= Turkic American =

Turkic American can refer to, among others:

- Azerbaijani Americans
- Kazakh Americans
- Turkish Americans
- Tatar Americans
- Uzbek Americans
- Uyghur Americans

== Other people of Turkic American descent ==
- Ralph Bakshi is an American animator, filmmaker and painter
- Agha Shahid Ali was an Indian-born American poet
- David Chokachi actor
- Fazlur Rahman Khan Considered the "father of Tube (structure) and was also a pioneer in Computer-aided design
- U Thant was a Burmese diplomat and the third secretary-general of the United Nations and Mughal descent
- Salih Nur Neftçi was a leading expert in the fields of financial markets and financial engineering.
- Yehudi Menuhin American-born British violinist and conductor
- Anatoliy Kokush film engineer, businessman, and inventor
- Lisa Marie Varon is a retired American professional wrestler, fitness competitor and bodybuilder
- Lou Novikoff professional baseball player.
- Jim Loscutoff professional basketball player.
- Shirley Babashoff Olympic swimming champion.
