= The Path (The Last of Us) =

- The Last of Us episode
- Ellie (Bella Ramsey) visits Joel's grave. The scene was written to provide viewers a chance to grieve, and its cinematography and Ramsey's performance were praised.
- Episode no.: Season 2 Episode 3
- Directed by: Peter Hoar
- Written by: Craig Mazin
- Cinematography by: Ksenia Sereda
- Editing by: Simon Smith
- Original air date: April 27, 2025
- Running time: 56 minutes

Guest appearances
- Rutina Wesley as Maria; Robert John Burke as Seth; Danny Ramirez as Manny; Michael Abbott Jr. as Jacob; Catherine O'Hara as Gail

Episode chronology
| ← Previous "Through the Valley" | Next → "Day One" |
- The Last of Us season 2

"The Path" is the third episode of the second season of the American post-apocalyptic drama television series The Last of Us. Written by series co-creator Craig Mazin and directed by Peter Hoar, it aired on HBO on April 27, 2025. The episode follows Ellie (Bella Ramsey), Tommy (Gabriel Luna), Dina (Isabela Merced), and Jesse (Young Mazino) three months after the infected attack on their town of Jackson, Wyoming, as Ellie advocates for tracking down Joel's killers in Seattle.

The episode was filmed around April 2024. The writers wanted it to follow Jackson and pay respects to Joel, allowing the audience to grieve. The episode introduces the Seraphites, a religious group in Seattle whose designs were based on the game's version; their facial scars required prosthetics, which underwent several designs. Critics praised the episode's direction, cinematography, writing, and Ramsey and Merced's chemistry, though some found the dialogue and themes heavy-handed. The episode had 768,000 viewers on linear television.

== Plot ==
In the aftermath of the infected attack on Jackson, Wyoming, and Joel's death, (Note: As depicted in "Through the Valley") Tommy cleans Joel's body. Ellie is admitted to hospital, and wakes up screaming upon remembering Joel's death. Three months later, while Jackson is still being rebuilt, Ellie is deemed physically ready to leave the hospital. She has a psychological evaluation with Gail, who asks her about her feelings on Joel's death and mentions their last session together where he said that he saved Ellie. (Note: Joel's session with Gail is depicted in "Future Days"; he refers to his actions in "Look for the Light", where he rescues Ellie from the Fireflies and lies that they were unable to find a cure for the infected.) Though Gail probes for information, Ellie claims not to know what he was referring to and insists she has mentally recovered. She visits Joel's house, mourning for him until Dina arrives and tells her that the group who killed Joel—members of the Washington Liberation Front (WLF)—are based in Seattle.

At a town hall meeting, several townspeople oppose the sending of a group to Seattle to track down Joel's killers. Seth angrily argues that they should send the group to defend Jackson and its reputation, and Ellie reads a letter persuading the council to send the group out of justice, not revenge; the council rejects the proposal by majority. Tommy speaks with Gail and worries that Ellie will be out of control. Gail tells him that some people cannot be saved from themselves and their actions. As Ellie prepares to leave for Seattle alone, Dina tells her she will join her; Seth provides them with a horse and supplies, and helps them leave quietly.

The following morning, Ellie leaves coffee beans on Joel's grave. As she and Dina travel to Seattle, they discuss their kiss at the New Year's Eve party, (Note: As depicted in "Future Days") claiming it meant nothing. Dina says she thinks Jesse is sad, suspecting he is inherently so and fearing it otherwise might be due to her. Outside the city, Ellie and Dina encounter a group of dead Seraphites—a religious group based in Seattle—including a young girl, who had been leaving the city before being hunted; the sight causes Dina to vomit. They arrive in Seattle and notice a lack of WLF members. Unbeknownst to Ellie and Dina, a convoy of dozens of WLF soldiers march through the streets of Seattle with several armored vehicles.

== Production ==
=== Conception and writing ===
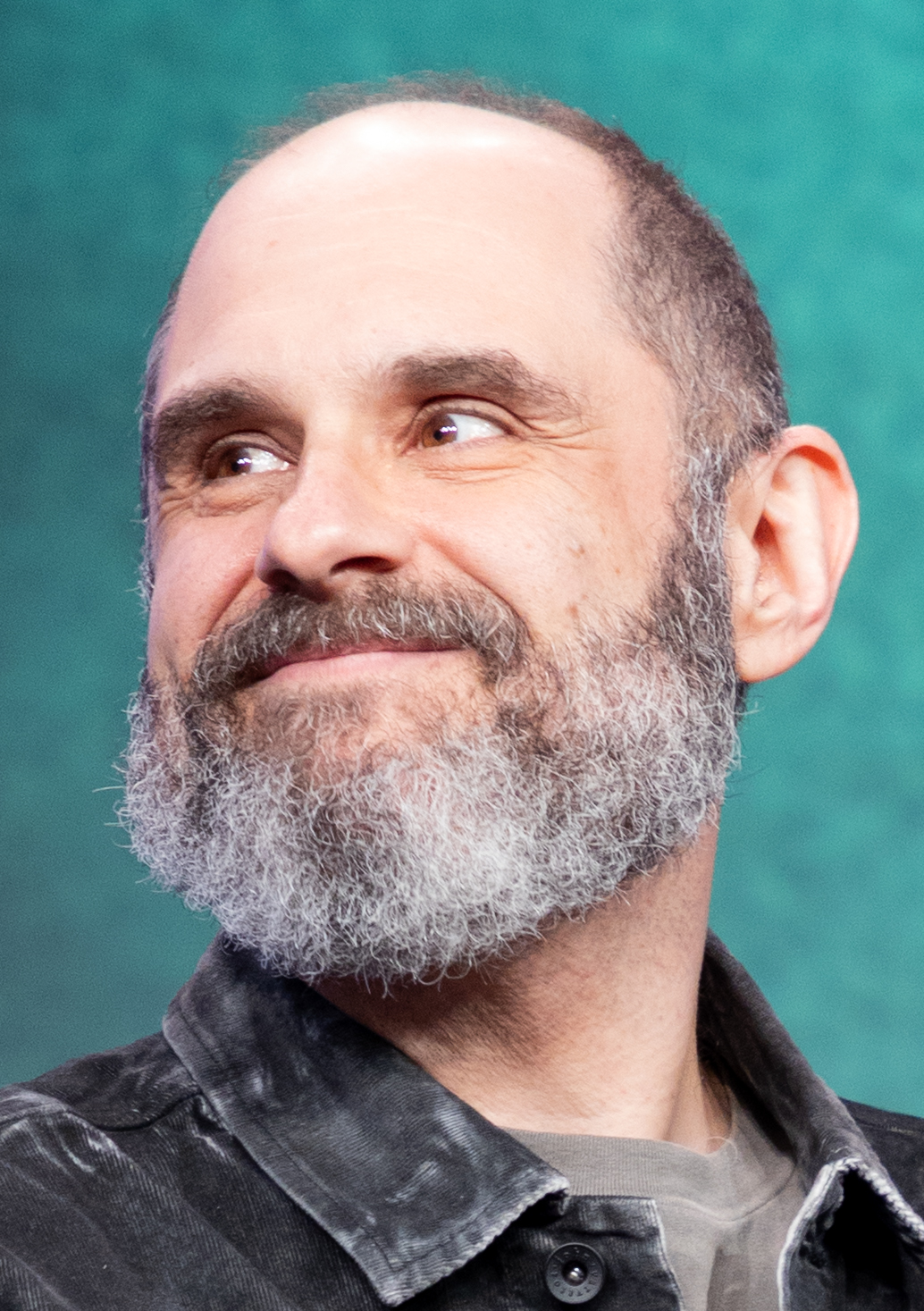
"The Path" was written by The Last of Us series co-creator Craig Mazin.

"The Path" was written by The Last of Us series co-creator Craig Mazin and directed by Peter Hoar. Hoar's return to the series was announced in January 2024; he previously directed the first-season episode "Long, Long Time". "The Path" was edited by Simon Smith, who previously worked with Mazin on Chernobyl (2019). The writers felt the episode's opening moments should pay respects to Joel, particularly due to the audience's grief; Mazin considered it important to focus specifically on family, as the series's opening episode initially focused on Joel, Sarah, and Tommy, of whom only Tommy remains. Tommy originally had more dialogue in the scene addressing Ellie, but it was later cut to one line about Sarah. Series co-creator Neil Druckmann—who co-directed and co-wrote The Last of Us Part II (2020), the game on which the second season is based—found the scene moving.

Druckmann felt the series provided an opportunity to follow Jackson in the aftermath of Joel's death, which is featured in the game but not expanded upon. The writers thought Ellie being forced to remain in hospital for three months gave her more time to reflect on Joel's death and consider her next actions. Mazin considered the scene at Joel's grave an opportunity for viewers to grieve, akin to a funeral, before Ellie and Dina proceed to Seattle. He and Hoar compared Ellie's scene with Gail to a "fist fight", with both characters dueling with words and intellect. Mazin felt Ellie's retrieval of Joel's gun—instead of other belongings like his watch—reflects her relationship with Joel: they saved each other using violence and she intends to avenge him the same way.

Mazin and Druckmann thought the town hall meeting allowed more characters to share their thoughts after Joel's death; they spoke extensively about the scene before writing it. Druckmann cried when reading Mazin's draft, moved that someone would advocate for Joel; that it was Seth, who had clashed with Joel in the second-season premiere, made it more impactful. Mazin found Seth's advocacy a reflection of real life, wherein someone with opposing values shares the same opinion, making them question their instincts. He found it difficult to write Ellie's speech, wanting it to be "pretty good, but not honest", and felt Bella Ramsey (who portrays Ellie) faced a similar challenge in performing it. A scene after the town hall meeting—in which Ellie dismisses her vengeance while Dina appears unconvinced—was cut. The credits feature a new version of Gustavo Santaolalla's song "The Path"—originally composed for the first game, The Last of Us (2013)—played on guitar by Tom Morello; it was recorded in Santaolalla's Los Angeles studio La Casa, and released as a digital single.

Druckmann considered the Seraphites an extension of groups in the first season using different methods of survival: the Seraphites through religion. Mazin compared the Seraphite father–daughter to real parental relationships in which children incessantly ask questions, best reflected in Cormac McCarthy's novel The Road (2006), which partly inspired Druckmann for the first game. The Seraphites' designs were inspired by the game's development material, including the hairstyles and ponchos; costume designer Ann Foley considered the latter appropriate for the apocalyptic setting. Made of stiff canvas and broken down, they were designed with waterproof layers in case of rain, which occurred during filming, and the symbols on their clothes were hand-painted. Foley appreciated the episode's focus on non-infected characters. Prosthetics designer Barrie Gower and his team decided on consistent appearances based on the characters' features, like that young children would not have scars. Four versions of the scarring were tested, including inverted and keloid designs; depressive scarring, similar to the game, was chosen but intentionally made less intimidating to keep the characters' intentions unclear. The scar prosthetics were made of a paste-based appliance and thickened with a food mixer; they took around 30–45 minutes to apply to the actors. Gower wanted to ensure they did not inhibit the performances or "take up too much space".

=== Casting and characters ===
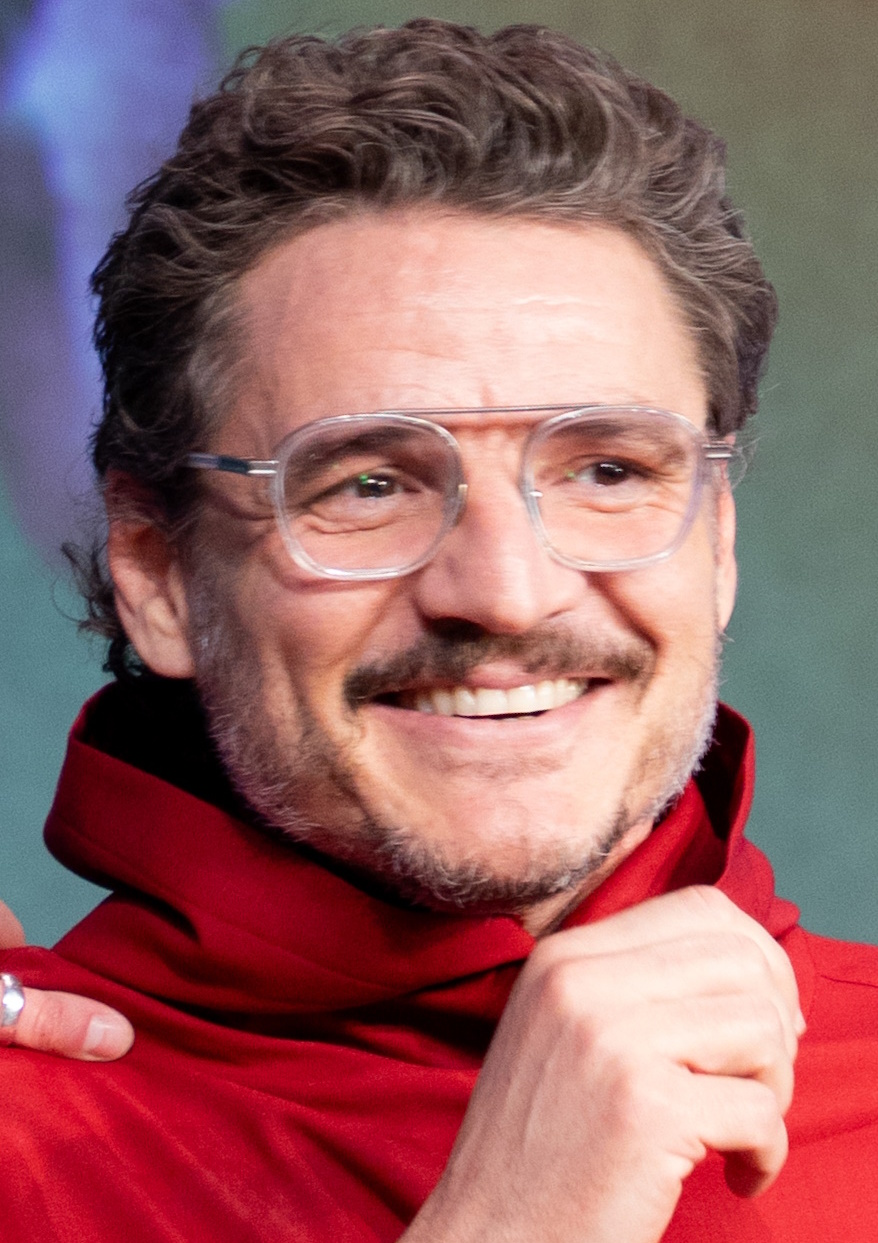
"The Path" marked the first The Last of Us episode without Pedro Pascal as Joel.

"The Path" marked the first The Last of Us episode not to feature Pedro Pascal as Joel; his name and the silhouette symbolizing Joel were removed from the title sequence. Gabriel Luna (who portrays Tommy) felt Pascal's departure led to "kind of a restructuring of the family dynamics", with other cast members "now responsible for different aspects of our community". Ramsey was saddened by Pascal's departure but was prepared to step up as the primary lead actor and set the tone. When Ellie awakes in hospital, Ramsey vividly recalled filming Joel's death, which heightened their emotions. They felt the episode showed Ellie experiencing the stages of grief, beginning "broken and numb" before becoming angry, and recognized that Ellie had gradually become like Joel, which Hoar felt was reflected in mannerisms such as Ellie's handling of guns and riding the horse at the front with Dina behind. Ramsey considered the scenes at Joel's house among the most difficult to perform—more difficult than Joel's death scene—as they struggle to cry on camera, particularly around the large crew. They found it easier to conjure tears when thinking of happy memories with Pascal, especially as they were exhausted while filming.

Luna anticipated the opening scene more than the previous episode's action sequences. He was worked up with emotion before filming and tried to relax as he felt the scene was asking the audience to reflect after the monumental story shift of Joel's death. He prepared for each take outside the restaurant in the "eerily empty" streets, of which the technical aspects allowed him to "dry up" the emotion before becoming immersed. Luna recalled his grief at funerals, particularly his grandfather's in 2013, during which he was alone, and considered it a farewell to Pascal's leadership on the series. He asked Hoar to start filming with a close-up as he felt he was "kind of already there" in the emotions. Pascal's body double, Philippe, was used in the scene, dressed in full makeup at Luna's request to prompt Tommy's physical reaction of anger and disgust. Luna coincidentally worked with Philippe six months later on Devil in Disguise: John Wayne Gacy (2025), which he felt reflected the lack of finality to Joel's character. Tommy had a more significant breakdown in some takes, and most of the scripted dialogue was cut; Luna was satisfied with the final cut's restraint, considering Tommy "a man of few words" and the dialogue unnecessary.

Luna enjoyed working with Catherine O'Hara; they met and worked together on the film Temple Grandin (2010) but did not share any scenes. Tommy and Maria's son, Benjamin, was originally present when Ellie speaks with Tommy, but the scene was reworked as actor Ezra Agbonkhese was sick; Luna felt the intention behind Tommy's restraint was missing with Benjamin's absence. He believed Tommy's decision not to pursue Abby—unlike in the game—showed he was less motivated by "blind violence" and more on protecting his loved ones. Luna thought Tommy and Maria voted yes at the town hall, approving the Seattle mission, while Jesse voted no, based on conversations with Young Mazino (who portrays Jesse); Isabela Merced (Dina) thought Jesse voted yes. Rutina Wesley (Maria) initially thought Maria would vote no but changed her mind after speaking with Mazin, realizing that the search for Joel's killers was for Jackson rather than Joel. A cut scene revealed that Jesse reluctantly joined the town council after one of its members was killed; Mazino considered the character "a stickler for the damn rules". He thought Jesse would follow the community consensus regardless of his own opinions, caring about his friends but understanding "he has to put the community first". He considered Jesse the opposite of Ellie; while the latter is focused on revenge, the former chooses to act level-headed and look towards serving his community.

Merced tried to imitate a parent trying to share bad news with a child when Dina tells Ellie about the WLF, noting "Dina tames Ellie". She thought the scene was a convenient way for the characters to avoid discussing their feelings for each other. Merced wanted to show Dina's "ride-or-die mentality" to demonstrate her unwavering loyalty to Ellie. The scene was re-filmed months later at HBO's request; Mazin changed little besides Ellie and Dina's positioning, which Merced felt made the scene more compelling, and making Dina's memory of Abby's group more vague. Merced found that re-filming the scene at the end of the season's production made her more patient and sympathetic with Ellie's feelings. Of the later scene of Ellie and Dina sharing a tent, Merced appreciated that the characters' connection was more emotional than sexual, as is often the case with sapphic relationships in media. Costume designer Ann Foley was drawn to Dina's Aviator Nation jacket for its "early 90s vibes", fitting the character's effervescent personality despite not fitting the timeline, having been created after 2003. She found the jacket early in production and added it to her mood board; Druckmann was drawn to it, and they and Mazin spoke about it extensively. Foley aged it with several chemicals and tools to make it appear over 20 years old.

=== Filming ===
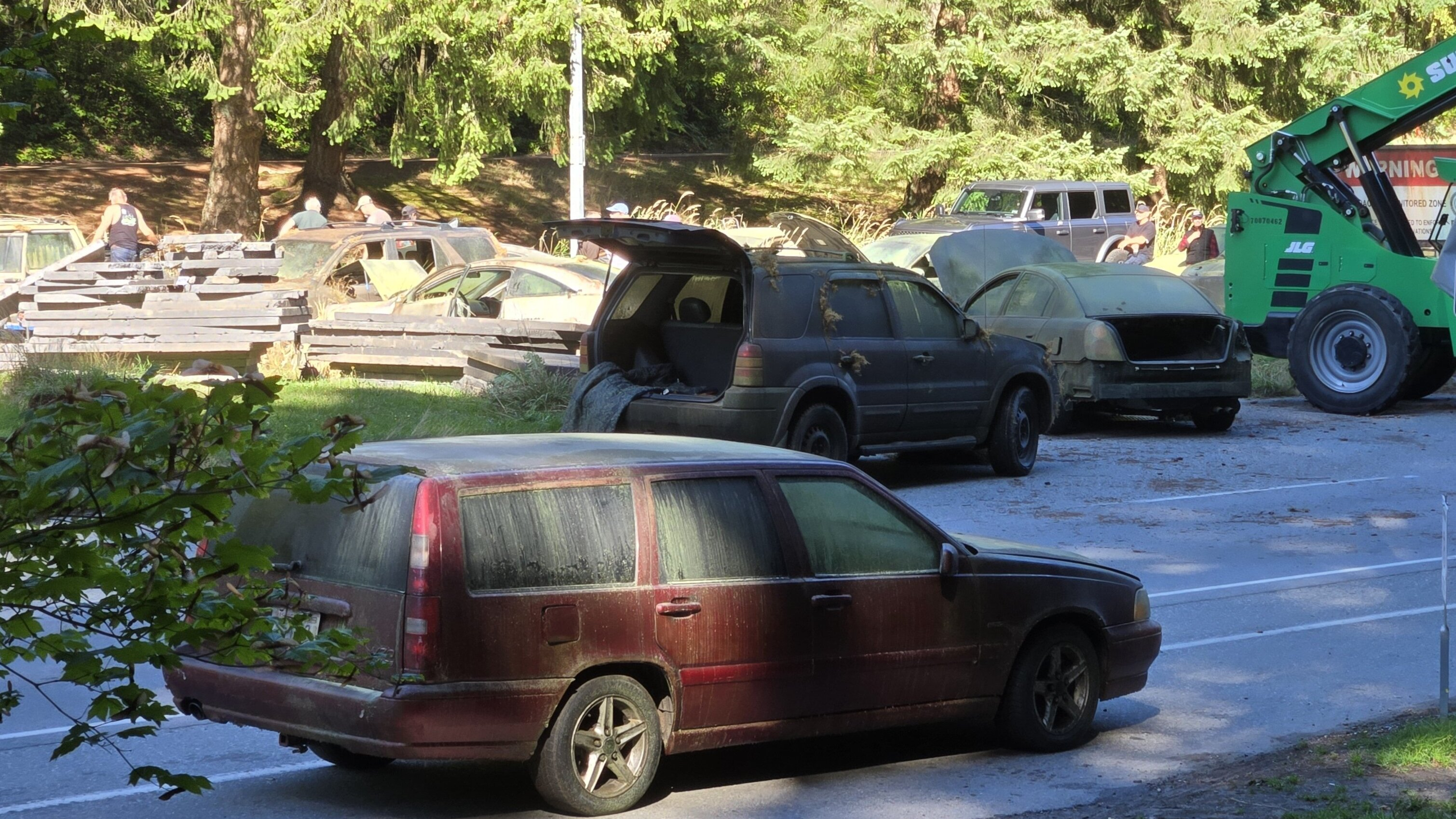
Additional photography took place in Downtown Vancouver in September 2024, featuring a convoy of military vehicles.

Production on the episode began in April 2024. Ksenia Sereda, the series's lead director of photography, worked on the episode with Hoar. Sereda avoided making the night scenes "overly blue", preferring to "preserve these very warm, almost muddy, dusty, rusty feeling to everything". The Seattle scenes were crafted with cooler, more humid tones than Jackson's "brown, Western texture". Scenes in Jackson were filmed on a 292,500-square-foot (27,170 m^{2}) set built on a parking lot in Vancouver, used in the previous two episodes, featuring 45 partly constructed buildings. The interior hospital scenes were filmed in a studio in Vancouver; Sereda adapted the lighting to match Ellie's darkening emotions, for which they signalled Ramsey to change their facial expressions.

Joel's house was a real home in Langley, and the interior was built on a soundstage specifically for the episode. Sereda wanted the lighting in the house to move from empty and cold on the ground floor to bright and warm upstairs, reflecting Ellie's journey. Sereda cried while filming the scenes. Hoar wanted the camera to be "uncomfortably close" to characters to feel their pain; Sereda moved the camera closer as the scene progressed, culminating in a close shot when Ellie finds Joel's jacket. The cemetery scene was filmed over two days to maintain consistent lighting; the first day consisted of wide shots, while the second was close-ups.

Four cameras were operating in the town hall scene, which encompassed six-and-a-half pages of script and was shot in one day; Sereda wanted to ensure several actors and their performances were captured, and Hoar felt fewer takes from different angles made the performances more powerful. Additional photography took place at the exterior of the Guinness Tower and Oceanic Plaza in Downtown Vancouver from September 13–17, featuring a convoy of military vehicles; West 16th Avenue was closed for the last two days, replicating the highway to Seattle with several broken vehicles. A separate unit filmed in the United States to match Ellie and Dina's journey. Seattle's skyline was crafted primarily with photography blended with computer-generated buildings and matte paintings. Due to weather issues, the scene at Joel's grave was filmed after the season's principal photography had wrapped in Montana—one of the few filmed in the United States. It was Ramsey and Merced's last scene together for the season.

== Reception ==
=== Broadcast and ratings ===
To celebrate the series's inclusive casting, Max partnered with Complex to host an advance screening of "The Path" at NYA Studios in Los Angeles on April 24, 2025, including a panel discussion with actors Ariela Barer, Tati Gabrielle, Luna, Merced, and Danny Ramirez. The episode aired on HBO on April 27. On linear television, the episode had 768,000 viewers, with a 0.18 ratings share. The series was the most-viewed across all streaming services for the following week, and the fifth-most-viewed for overall watch time, with 827 million minutes streamed on Max. It was the most in-demand show in Canada, with more than 76 times the average television demand the preceding week and more than 67 times the following week.

=== Critical response ===
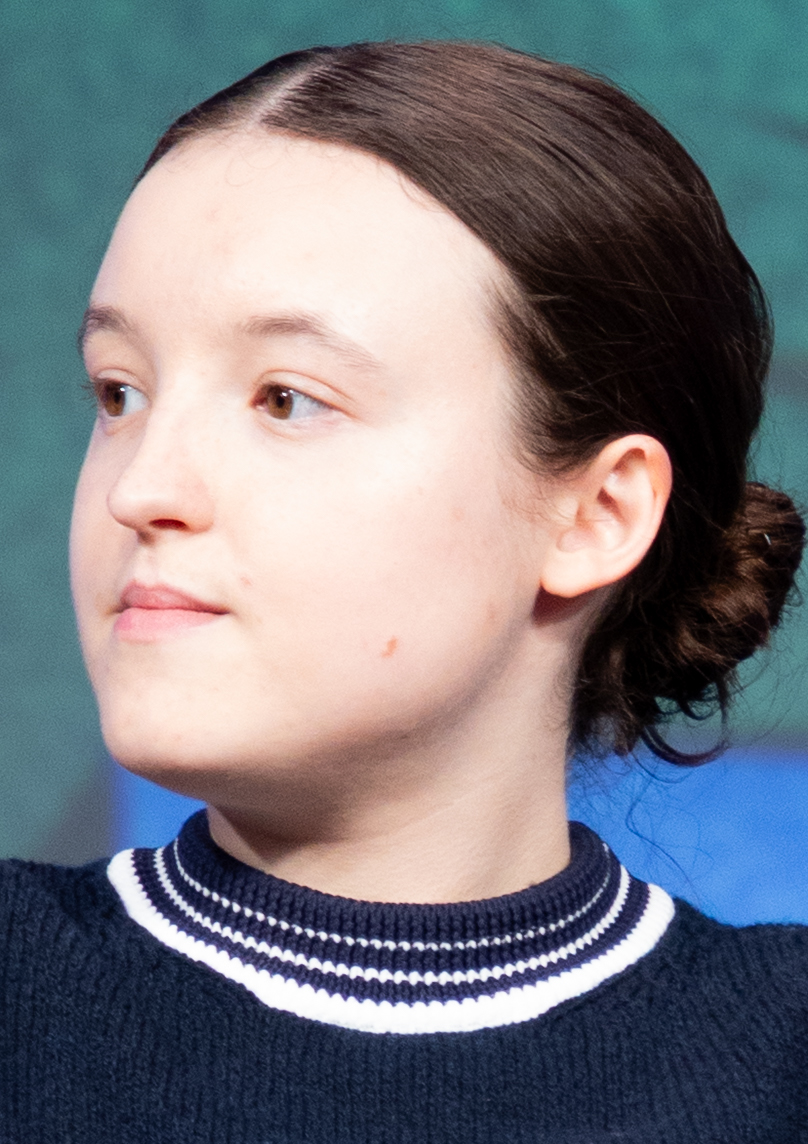
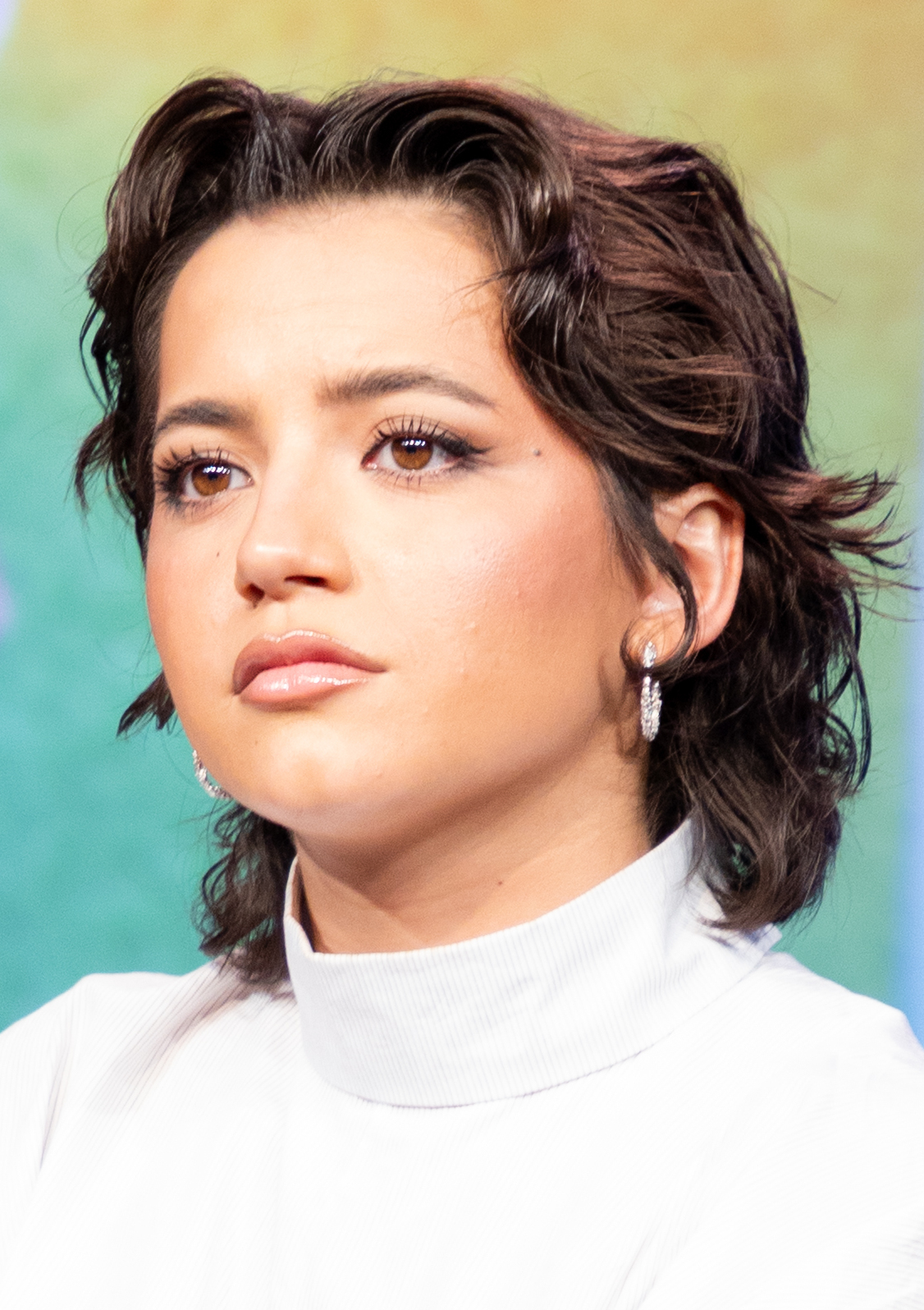
Critics praised the chemistry between Bella Ramsey (left) and Isabela Merced (right).

"The Path" has an approval rating of 96% on review aggregator Rotten Tomatoes based on 24 reviews, with an average rating of 7.9 out of 10. The website's critical consensus noted the episode acted "as a healing reprieve for both character and audience". Critics praised Hoar's direction and Sereda's cinematography, particularly in the scene at Joel's grave and the travel montage sequence to Seattle, which many compared to a Western film. TheWrap's Alex Welch called the graveyard scene "one of the most cinematic and visually striking moments that The Last of Us has ever achieved".

Critics praised Ramsey's performance for depicting Ellie's grief and fury, which Den of Geek's Brynna Arens felt immediately reminded viewers of Joel's death. Seattle Times's Dominic Baez highlighted the scene at Joel's grave wherein Ramsey shows "Ellie's still-fresh grief clearly etched across her face", and IGN's Simon Cardy praised the scenes in Joel's house. The Telegraph's Chris Bennion enjoyed Ramsey's performance but considered the character "hard to sympathise with and even harder to love", and Screen Rant's Mary Kassel found Ramsey "really struggles throughout the episode" due to Ellie's repressed feelings. Several reviewers lauded Merced's performance, particularly her chemistry with Ramsey; Vanity Fair's Joshua Rivera praised Merced's addition of "spunk to an otherwise pretty dour show" as well as "the way she lingers even between chipper moments". The A.V. Club's Caroline Siede enjoyed Mazino's "warm yet practical addition to the series", and IGN's Cardy applauded the "aching tenderness" of Luna's opening dialogue. Some critics expressed concern about the series's ongoing quality without Pascal.

Collider's Ross Bonaime called the episode "somber but necessary", praising its depiction of "the beauty of shared pain". Rolling Stone's Alan Sepinwall found the peaceful Seattle journey an appropriate reminder of the narrative themes, on which the infected are cursory; The A.V. Club's Siede felt the episode's aimlessness was both intentional and concerning, noting the second season's nebulous pacing was less dependable than the first's. Praise was directed at Tommy's opening scene and Ellie's return to Joel's house, which was compared to Brokeback Mountain's ending. Some reviewers considered Gail's dialogue heavy-handed; The Ringer's Daniel Chin found it a convenient method to provide insight into Joel and Ellie. Kotaku's Kenneth Shepard called it "one of the most disappointing" scenes and felt the town hall "sounded like a podcast of people debating" the narrative's morality. IGN's Cardy similarly found Seth heavy-handed, and Polygon's Susan Polo thought his redemptive arc made his homophobia simply a vehicle through which to express narrative frameworks. Screen Rant's Kassel criticized the episode's pacing as "both too fast and too slow", citing the quick transition to Seattle and the Seraphites' introduction and immediate off-screen deaths. Some enjoyed the Seraphites' scene but questioned its placement, unfavorably comparing it to The Walking Dead ; CBR's Katie Doll felt introducing them as pitiful removes the audience's opportunity to engage with their growth over time, as achieved in the game.
