= Through the Valley (The Last of Us) =

- The Last of Us episode
- Abby crawls as an infected horde crushes her. The sequence was closely adapted from the game and critics praised the horror and claustrophobia of its cinematography.
- Episode no.: Season 2 Episode 2
- Directed by: Mark Mylod
- Written by: Craig Mazin
- Cinematography by: Catherine Goldschmidt
- Editing by: Timothy A. Good
- Original air date: April 20, 2025
- Running time: 57 minutes

Guest appearances
- Kaitlyn Dever as Abby; Rutina Wesley as Maria; Robert John Burke as Seth; Spencer Lord as Owen; Tati Gabrielle as Nora; Ariela Barer as Mel; Danny Ramirez as Manny; Ezra Agbonkhese as Benjamin "Benji"

Episode chronology
← Previous "Future Days"	Next → "The Path"
- The Last of Us season 2

"Through the Valley" is the second episode of the second season of the American post-apocalyptic drama television series The Last of Us. Written by series co-creator Craig Mazin and directed by Mark Mylod, it aired on HBO on April 20, 2025. The episode follows Ellie (Bella Ramsey) and Jesse (Young Mazino) on patrol as they search for Joel (Pedro Pascal) and Dina (Isabela Merced), while Tommy (Gabriel Luna) prepares for an attack on Jackson, Wyoming, and Abby (Kaitlyn Dever) seeks revenge against Joel.

The episode was filmed in early 2024. The attack on Jackson, written to provide ongoing character conflict and motivations, was filmed over almost four weeks and required more than 600 visual effects shots, around 100 extras, and dozens of stunt performers. The writers chose to depict Joel's death early in the season as it sets its narrative in motion. Critics praised the episode's direction, cinematography, writing, and Pascal, Ramsey, and Dever's performances, the latter being nominated for Guest Actress in a Drama Series at the Emmy Awards; some felt the Jackson attack overshadowed Joel's death, while others lauded the juxtaposition. The episode was watched by 643,000 viewers on linear television.

== Plot ==
Sheltering with her group in an abandoned lodge near Jackson, Wyoming, Abby has a dream in which she warns her past self not to enter the room in which her father was killed. (Note: Abby's father's death was depicted in "Look for the Light".) When she awakens, she focuses on her mission to kill Joel, while her friends, concerned about the town's security and her lack of a plan, consider retreating. Abby leaves to survey Jackson, and her friend Owen tells the rest of the group that he will try to convince her to return to Seattle.

Ellie tells Jesse that she wants to go on patrol with Joel, but Jesse informs her that he has already left with Dina. Abby accidentally awakens a large horde of infected hiding under the snow, and is rescued by Joel and Dina. In Jackson, the infected tendrils are discovered, redirecting the horde to the town, leading to a battle in which Jackson suffers heavy damage and casualties; Tommy defends his wife Maria against a bloater by drawing it away and killing it with a flamethrower.

Abby lures Joel and Dina to the lodge, saying she has friends who can help them defend Jackson. After knocking out Dina, Abby reveals herself to be the daughter of the Firefly doctor who Joel killed in Salt Lake City. She shoots Joel in the knee with a shotgun and repeatedly hits his knee wound with a golf club, beating him until the club breaks in two. Ellie, who had been searching for Joel and Dina, is restrained and forced to watch as Abby kills Joel by impaling his neck with the broken club. Ellie swears to kill Abby as revenge, but the group spares her and leaves. Jackson begins to recover from the carnage of the battle, as Ellie, Dina, and Jesse return home with Joel's body.

== Production ==
=== Conception and writing ===
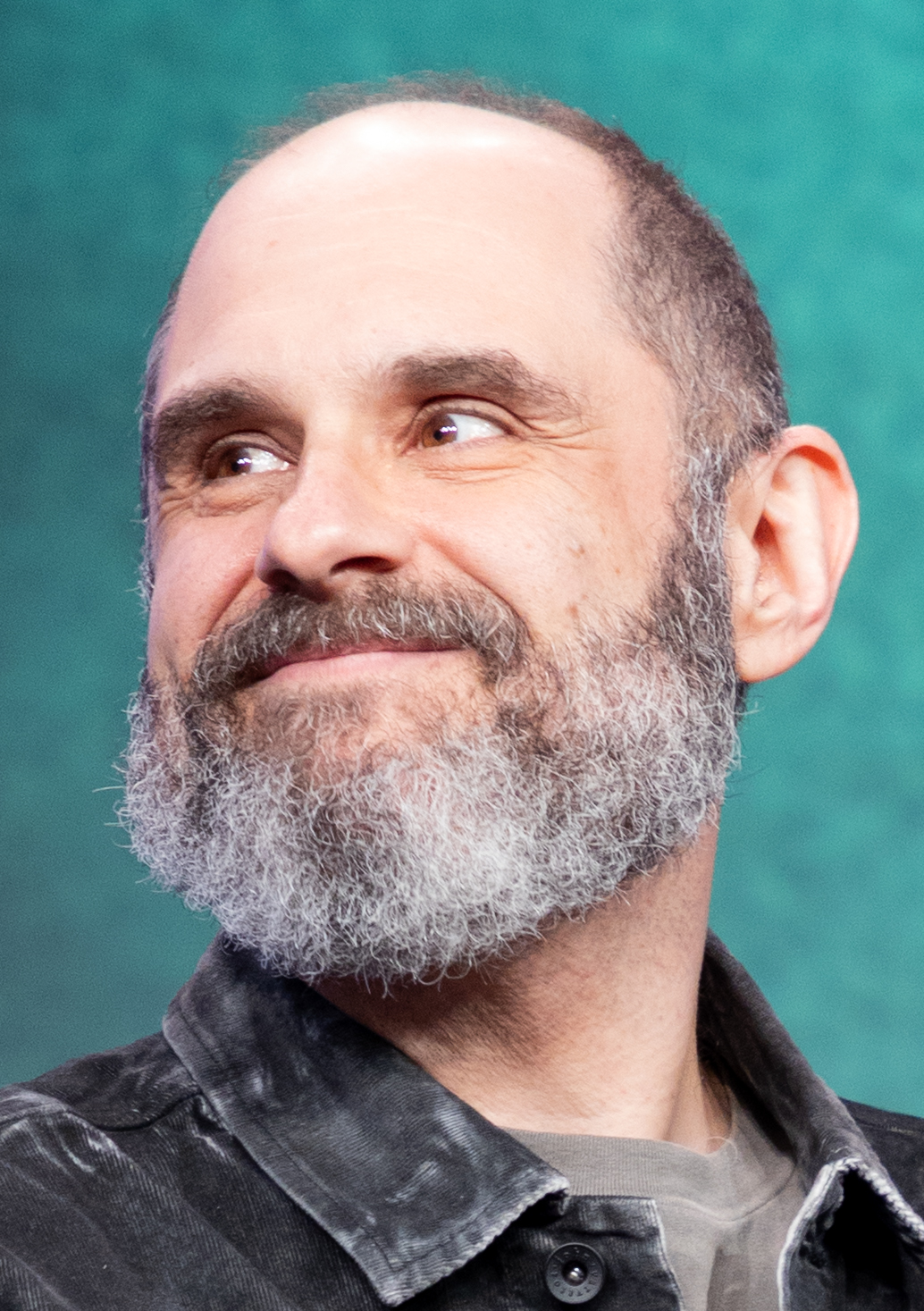
"Through the Valley" was written by series co-creator Craig Mazin.

"Through the Valley" was written by The Last of Us series co-creator Craig Mazin and directed by Mark Mylod. Mazin had wanted Mylod to work on the first season, but he was busy directing Succession. After Mylod mentioned wanting to work with Mazin during a panel, Mazin sent him the episode's script, which Mylod read and found irresistible. He previously directed the Game of Thrones episode "The Broken Man" (2016), which marked the first acting role for Bella Ramsey (who portrays Ellie). Mazin felt Mylod's experience in directing different genres made him suitable for the series, especially balancing the action scenes in Jackson and the delicacy in Joel's death. Deadline published Mazin's script in June 2025, considering it among the year's best drama episodes.

In The Last of Us Part II (2020), the game on which the second season is based, Joel is paired with Tommy on patrol and Ellie is paired with Dina; Joel was paired with Dina in the episode to show their relationship (as they do not interact in the game) and to more closely connect her with Joel's death. Keeping Dina separate from Ellie also made their ongoing relationship more ambiguous. Mazin felt it gave another reason for Joel not to defend himself against Abby, as doing so risked Dina's life. Ramsey found it added an element of resentment for Ellie, as Joel's final day was spent with Dina instead of her. Pairing Ellie with Jesse also allowed focus on their relationship.

Mazin learned of Joel's death during the development of Part II, before he began writing the show's first season. He felt it was the correct narrative decision and did not wish to remove it from the series, reasoning that its brutality was an effective consequence of Joel's actions. The writers spent a long time deciding which episode should depict Joel's death, and after briefly considering delaying it to later in the season, they decided against it. Mazin felt that plotting it in the season's second episode was appropriate after witnessing Joel and Ellie's strained relationship in the first. Neil Druckmann, the series co-creator who wrote and co-directed the games, thought it should occur early in the season, to parallel when its story begins in earnest; he believed plotting it later would feel like they "were kind of dragging [their] feet". Mazin also considered the real implications of leaving Joel's death until later in the season, understanding that viewers who had played the game would constantly be aware that it had not yet occurred, and he did not want to feel like the writers were "toying with everybody".

Mylod was more nervous about filming Joel's death than the action scenes due to its impact and his desire to do justice to the game's performances. Druckmann felt depicting its brutality allowed viewers to understand the characters' mindsets and their subsequent decisions, though it was reduced slightly from the game due to the realism of live action. Mazin and Mylod spent a long time discussing what level of violence to depict, believing it was necessary to justify Abby's actions while also being restrained enough to avoid glorifying it. The brutality was initially intended to be more subtle but Mylod thought avoiding showing Joel's death felt "coy" and like they "were ducking out". Mazin thought showing Abby's fists hitting Joel's face "would have been gratuitous and sort of action movie-ish", not reflective of the scene's true sadness and reprehensibility, while Mylod "wanted to avoid overt torture". In the game, Abby kills Joel with a final blow of the golf club, but Mazin felt this could not reasonably be achieved in the episode, instead seeking realism in the violence. Ellie's crawl towards Joel was present in Mazin's first draft of the script, reflecting her need to be with him. Mazin wrote unspoken dialogue in his scripts in italics to allow the actors to understand the characters' motivations; when Joel attempts to move after Ellie pleads with him to get up—in contrast to the game—the script clarified that he was aware of her presence and sought to act for her:

And now he hears her. We see it happen. He's barely conscious, but her voice will always cut through.
Ellie...
Ellie: Fucking get up... GET UP!
I will try for you. I would do anything for you. That's why I'm here. That's why this is happening.
I will try.
Abby walks slowly toward him.
Ellie: Get up... get up...
Joel tries with every ounce of strength he has left. But all it means is that his head lifts slightly... his trembling hand reaches out...
...and then he collapses again.

— Craig Mazin, "Through the Valley" Double Pink Draft (March 29, 2024)

The writers felt the lack of a player character allowed the series to show attacks on Jackson that are not depicted in the game. Druckmann appreciated the depiction of the infected's scale, which is implied in the games and first season but rarely demonstrated. The writers' familiarity with the show's production allowed for more action sequences, through which they maintained connections to character development. Mazin felt relationships like Tommy and Maria's increased the stakes, making it feel like more than "just a fight". Druckmann thought the inclusion of the siege added more ongoing conflict for the characters as they are dealing with more losses than just Joel, and Mazin felt the characters' loss of stability and safety in Jackson was palpable. Tommy's use of a flamethrower against the bloater is a reference to a weapon in the games and reflected the fear Mazin felt during gameplay. The battle originally featured two or three bloaters but was trimmed to one in post-production. The sequence with the frozen infected was expanded upon from the same scene in the game, whereas other sequences such as Abby being chased by the horde and saved by Joel were adapted more faithfully.

=== Casting and characters ===
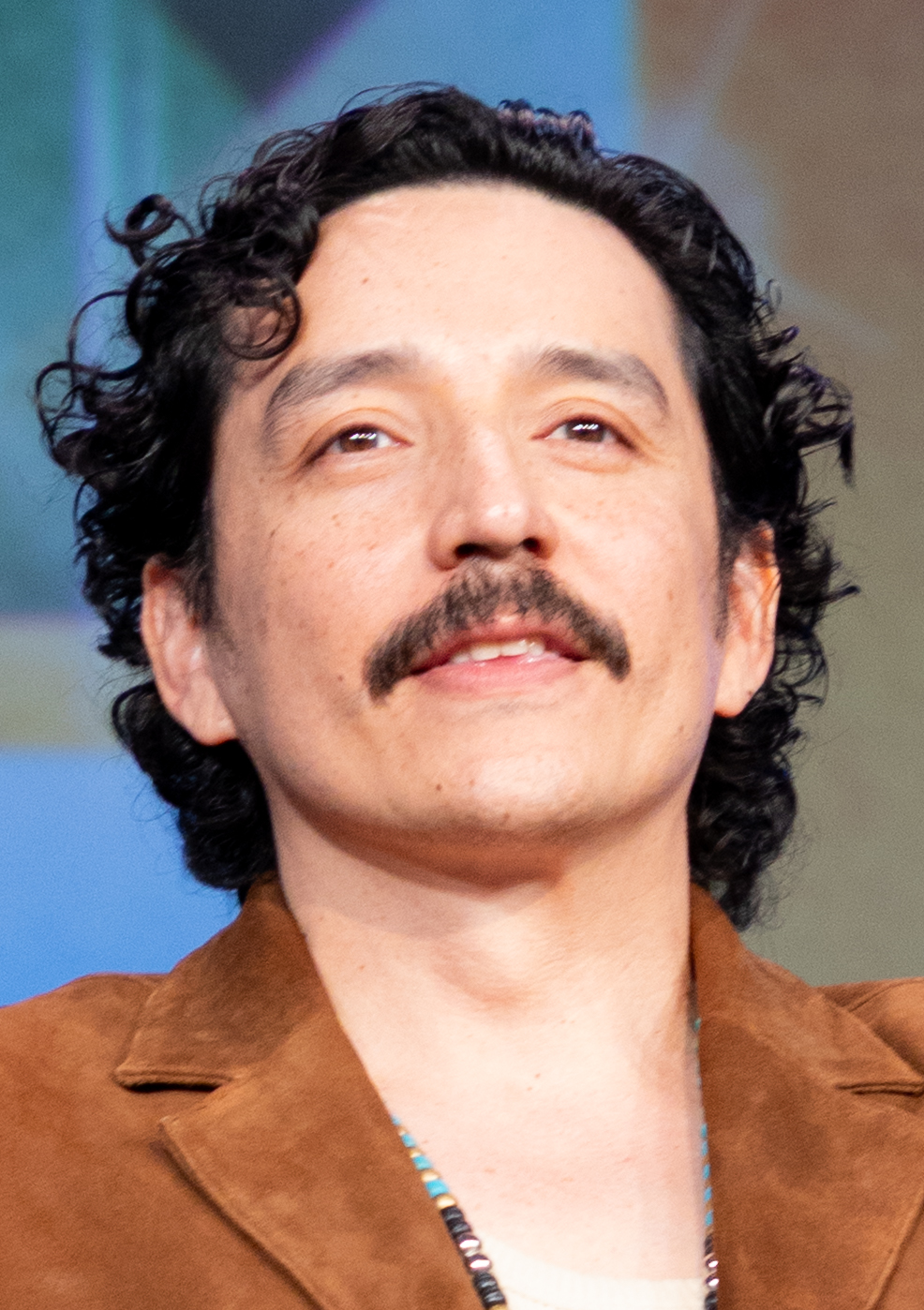
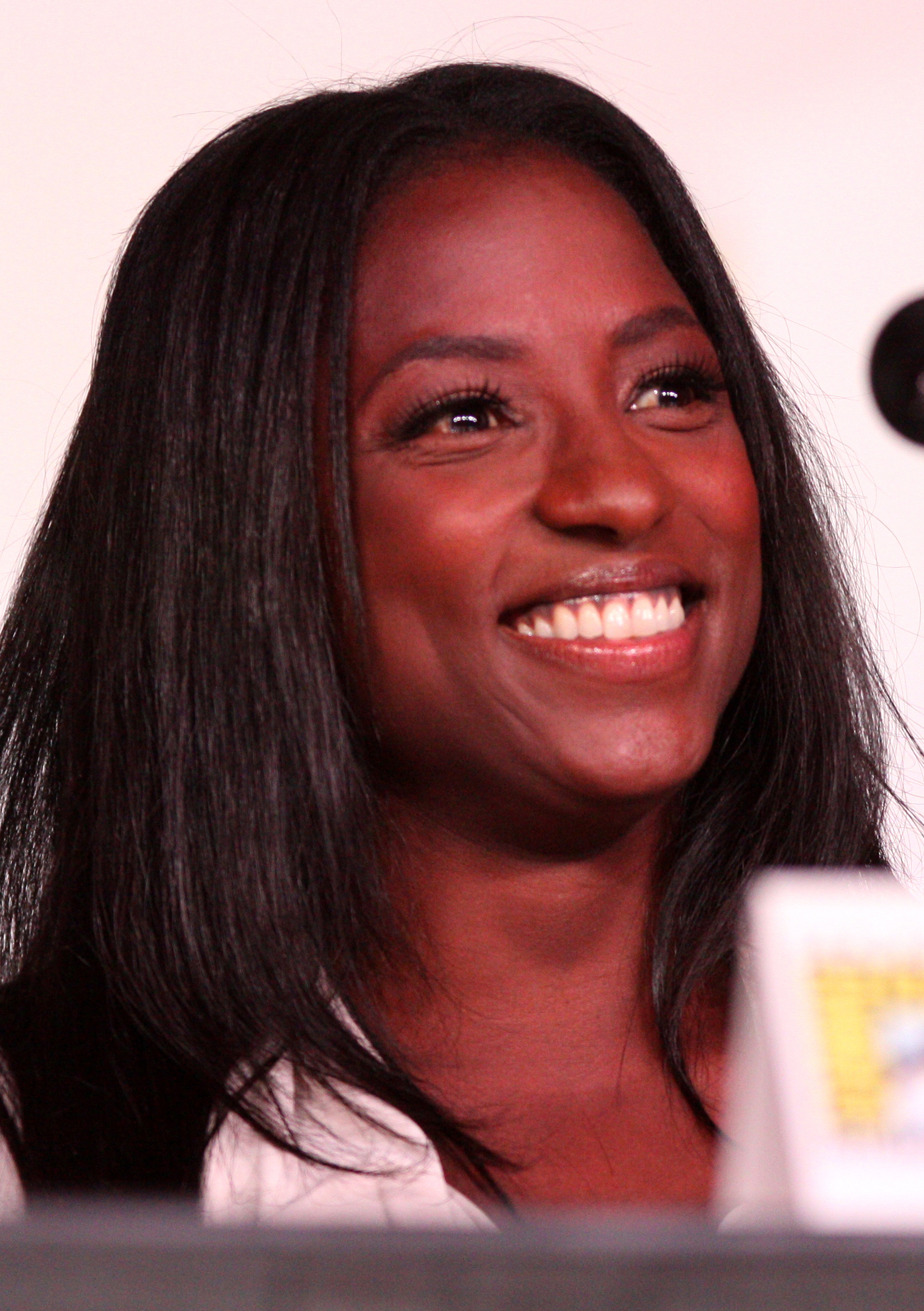
Gabriel Luna (left) and Rutina Wesley (right), who portray Tommy and Maria, underwent firearms and stunt training for the episode.

Pedro Pascal, who portrays Joel, was aware of the character's death when he first accepted the role. He felt unchanged while filming until his gory makeup and prosthetics were applied, which he felt "killed the vibe completely as soon as anyone set their eyes on me" out of grief. Mazin was not concerned about losing Pascal's popularity in his departure from the series, noting that the world and story are "the star". Pascal bonded with Kaitlyn Dever, who portrays Abby; he found their close relationship ironic considering their characters' conflict but felt it made them closer. Dever struggled to watch Joel and Ellie's emotional scene during filming.

Ramsey felt sick and cried while reading the script—a first for them. They prepared for Joel's death scene by treating it as ordinary, listening to the Buckwheat Boyz's "Peanut Butter Jelly Time" on a loop until seconds before each take to offset the darkness and exhaustion. They felt like they were experiencing the events for the first time alongside Ellie, recalling "it just all came out" during filming but finding it generally easier to perform than other moments as they knew "exactly what that scene needs to be". Ramsey performed the sequence around six times. They immediately smiled after each take to "snap out of it", and felt an "exhausted satisfaction and catharsis" after filming was completed. Ramsey performed 13 takes reacting to Joel's death. Mazin felt Ellie begging Joel to "get up" was imitative of the audience who felt the same. As Ellie looks upon Joel after he is killed, the script describes her face as "etched in pain... all at once a frightened, sobbing child and a terrible, vindictive monster".

Gabriel Luna, who portrays Tommy, anticipated the Jackson assault sequence since reading the script, comparing it to Game of Thrones's "Battle of the Bastards" (2016). With Rutina Wesley, who portrays Maria, he underwent firearms and stunt training, including with recreations of guns used in the game such as Tommy's M1 Garand. Luna practiced with a flamethrower for several minutes the day before filming; he later had recurring visions of flaming figures running towards him, which he suspected was due to trauma. He ensured he had his friend, stuntman Ty Provost, present on set to help him with stunts. Luna was bothered by Tommy's incapacitation during Joel's death in the game, and later became concerned about Tommy's absence in the episode; he felt reassured when Mazin sent him a large text outlining his plans for Tommy's story, including the Jackson battle. He wanted viewers to fear that Tommy would die during the episode. Druckmann felt Tommy's goals shift throughout the story: from protecting Jackson to saving Maria, who, alongside his son, he cares about the most. Wesley felt the two characters were "anchors for each other". Costume designer Ann Foley was inspired by a 1980s Marlboro advertisement with Tommy's outfit, which Luna found unique from the games.

The dead body of Abby's father was intentionally shown in the first-season finale due to its relevance in the second season, particularly in Abby's dream sequence. Dever wanted the character's grief and loss to be reflected in her eyes, considering her "a very broken human being". She felt that Abby did not achieve what she sought after killing Joel, still feeling the heartbreak with added guilt; Mazin considered Abby "unsatisfied" and felt she "was not in control of herself" during the scene. Dever found Joel's death "heartbreaking", as a viewer of the first season. The scene was her first in the series; filming occurred a few weeks after her mother's death and three days after the funeral. Though Pascal and Isabela Merced both had other filming obligations, the production schedule was overhauled to fit Dever's needs and she selected the day to film Joel's death, asking for minimal crew. She was unable to prepare for scenes in her usual manner—including missing her final costume fitting and hair and makeup tests—which she thought benefited the character by feeling more natural, and the collaborative effort of the crew made it "one of the greatest experiences [she has] ever had as an actor". Mazin wrote a monologue for Abby which was not present in the game, prompted by the revelation of Abby's motivations earlier in the series than in the game. Mylod felt Dever "would just give everything", even during takes not focused on Abby, which he called his "dream as the director". Mylod spoke to the actors as a group, which Dever compared to "a sports team" and felt created a supportive atmosphere.

=== Music ===
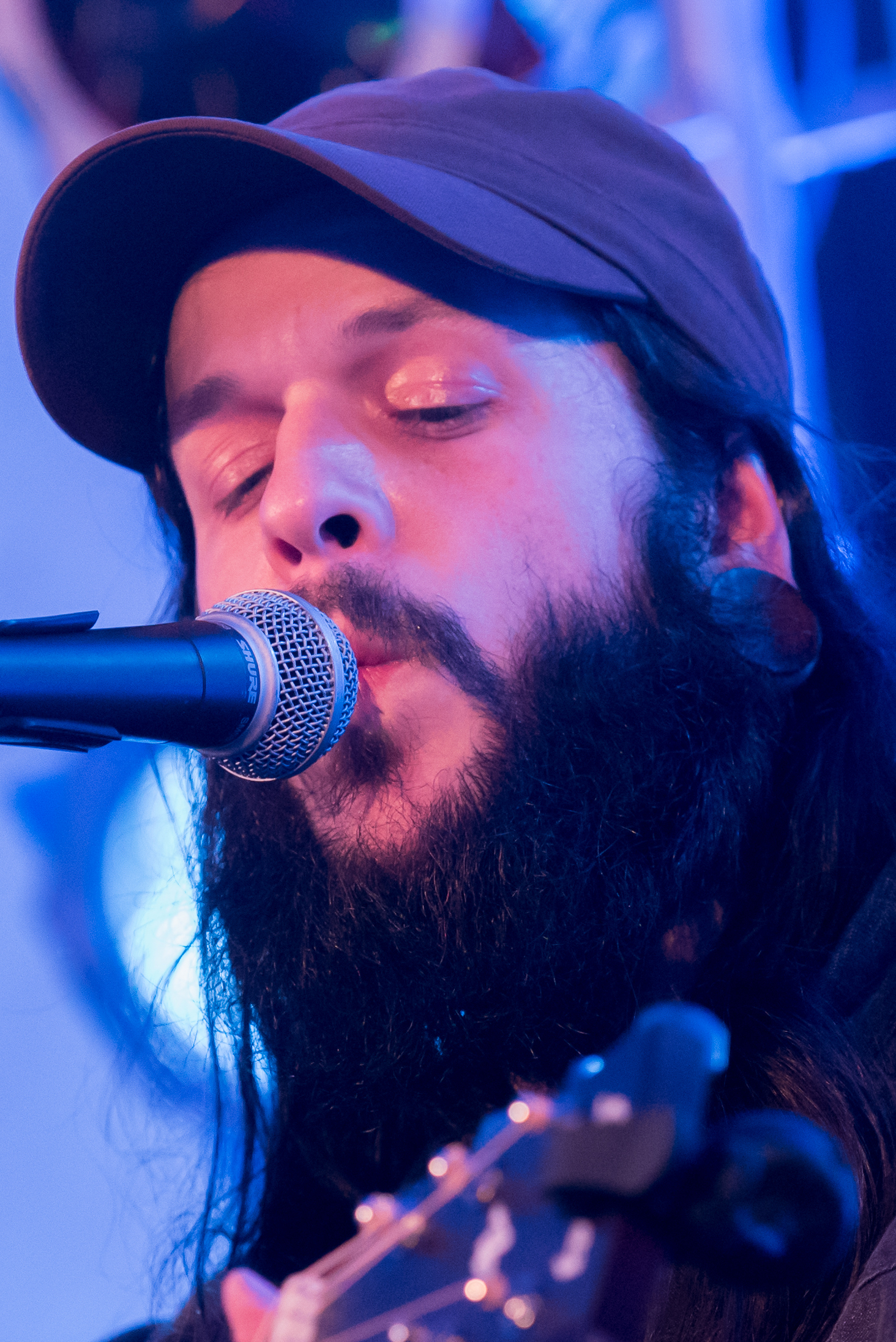
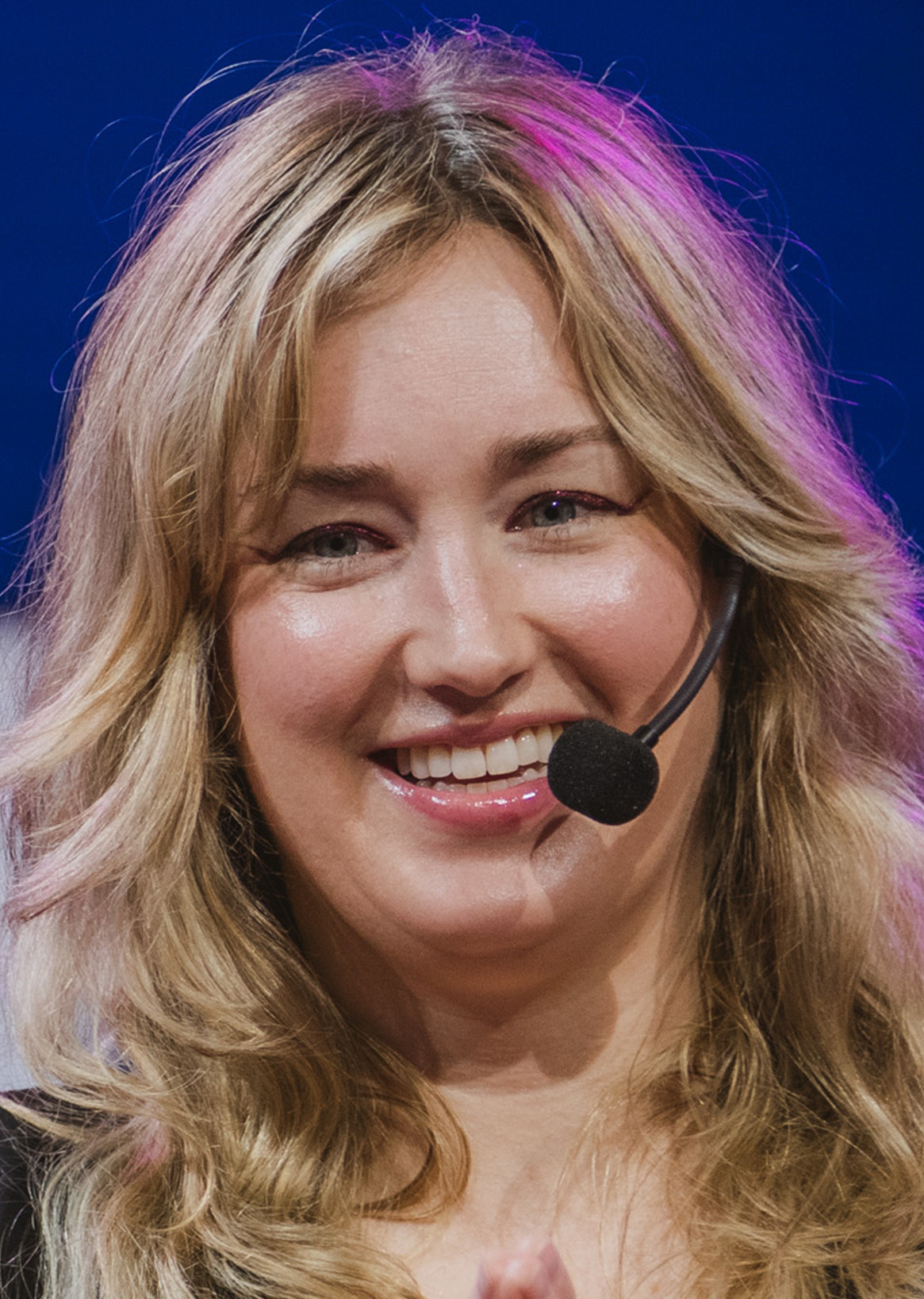
The episode features a cover of Shawn James's (left) song "Through the Valley" performed by Ashley Johnson (right), who portrayed Ellie in the games and Anna in the series; her cover was featured in the second game and its marketing.

The episode ends with a cover of Shawn James's song "Through the Valley" performed by Ashley Johnson, who portrayed Ellie in the games and Ellie's mother Anna in the series. Johnson's cover was previously featured in the second game and its marketing; the one featured in the episode is a blend of her original performance and a new recording, which adds a softer version of the second verse to better fit the scenes. Streams of Johnson's original cover increased by 1,005% on Spotify in the United States after the episode aired. Mazin felt its usage reflected Anna's love for Ellie during the scene wherein Ellie mourns Joel, essentially placing both of Ellie's parents within the sequence. He found some lyrics represented the episode's events—while Jackson may be saved, souls have been damned—and others reflected an unachievable desire for its characters:

I walk through the valley of the shadow of death
And I fear no evil because I'm blind to it all
And my mind and my gun, they comfort me
Because I know I'll kill my enemies when they come.

Composers Gustavo Santaolalla and David Fleming respectively worked on the series's character-driven and action-driven score. They wanted the episode's music to reflect the inevitability of its events without overplaying them, continually building up until Joel's death. Fleming approached the Jackson attack by de-tuning banjos and cellos, which were featured in previous episodes, and used larger drums and brass instruments. He broke the sequence in two, with the first focusing on the town's militaristic preparation and the second on the horde's overwhelming nature. Fleming wanted Abby's infected chase sequence to feel dramatic but not overshadow the Jackson attack; he worked closely with Mazin, attempting several versions to ensure it felt unique from other infected encounters.

Fleming and Santaolalla scored Abby to match her anger, pain, and trauma akin to Ellie's, rather than as a traditional antagonist. For Joel's death scene, Santaolalla reused several themes to create an "emotional peak" while diverting to new cues with established instruments like the ronroco, keeping "the aesthetics of the music with not only the themes, but the instrumentation and the rawness". The scene's music underwent several changes, originally being more active and continuous; Santaolalla did not want it to sound melodramatic, and Mazin sought more silence, wanting to create infrequent larger moments that felt more active, adding shock and making viewers feel closer to the characters akin to a game rather than passively viewing. They settled on using one of Santaolalla's tracks when Abby talks about her father's death, which they found effective.

=== Filming ===
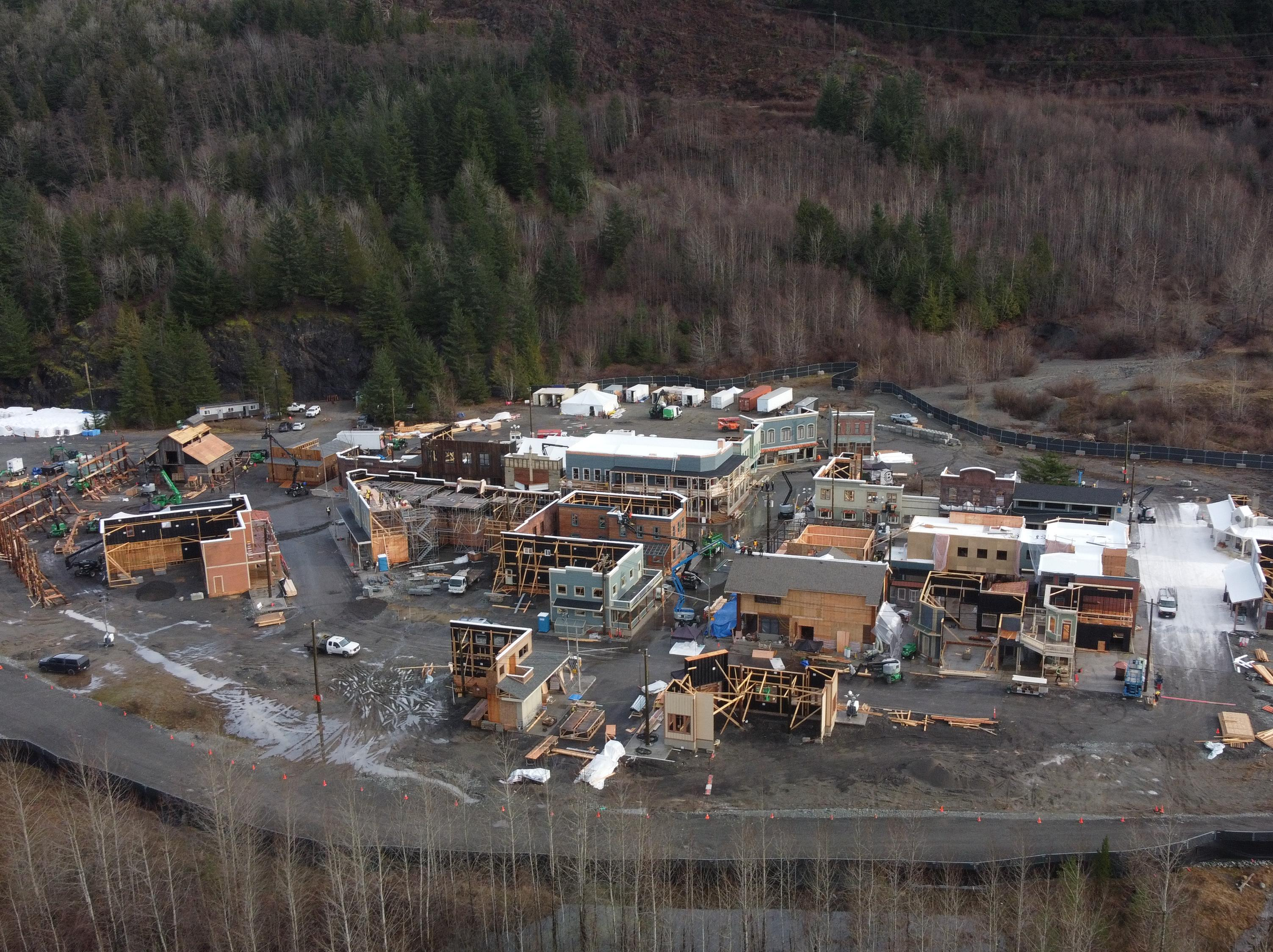
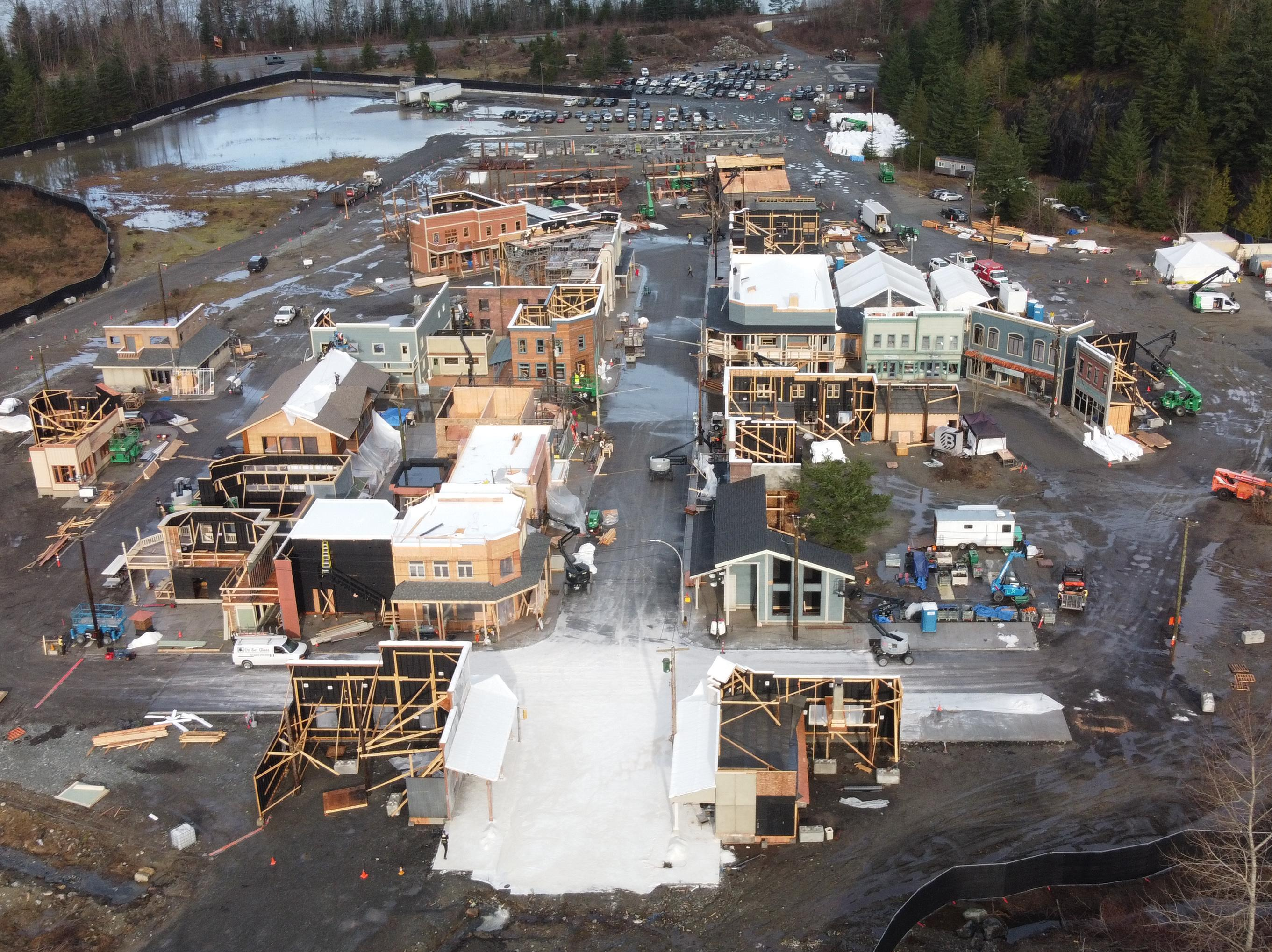
Filming occurred on set built on a private property in Britannia Beach in June and July 2024.

The episode was filmed over a month and a half, beginning in February 2024. Joel's death was filmed on March 7 in a house in Mission, British Columbia, avoiding the use of blue screens. Pascal was delayed a day when poor weather rerouted his flight. It was scheduled in the first week of production, adding extra pressure for cinematographer Catherine Goldschmidt. Mazin and Mylod spent hours determining each character's positioning; Mylod and Goldschmidt focused on Abby's friends' faces instead of the violence. Mel's crying was improvised by actress Ariela Barer. The ski lodge scenes were filmed over four days; of the two focused on Joel's death, one primarily involved Ellie's scenes. The sequence was designed to keep physical distance between Joel and Ellie; they are connected only through over-the-shoulder shots.

Mazin considered Joel's death prosthetics the season's most important. Pascal was 3D scanned to allow prosthetics designer Barrie Gower to craft with his measurements in mind, especially as Pascal's left eye would be closed. Once Ellie enters the scene, the camera shifts to her perspective. Mylod cried during one take due to Ramsey's performance "transcending" acting, feeling connected to Ellie's pain as a parent himself. An alternative version of the scene included Dina waking and reaching for a weapon, and some takes featured Manny spitting on Joel's corpse as he does in the game, but this was cut in favor of a better overall take. Goldschmidt filmed a crane shot of Ellie with Joel's dead body to allow viewers to understand the room's space and feel the moment's isolation and emptiness. While most of the scene was framed near the actors, Mylod wanted the final shot to depart from the visual style in a "final, judgmental" way.

Jackson scenes were filmed in Mission, Fort Langley, and Langley. The four-block town was built on a parking lot in Vancouver, measuring 292,500 square feet (27,170 m^{2}) and featuring 45 partly constructed buildings; many housed different production crews, such as the visual effects team in the Starbucks store. To demonstrate its growth, materials used in Jackson's first-season depiction were not reused. The action sequence was filmed over almost four weeks, including around two-and-a-half weeks and five days of second unit photography. Mylod and Goldschmidt storyboarded the action on set before it was completed by production designer Don Macauley and his team, adding necessary elements to assist production like fireproofing on buildings and catwalks for cast and crew. Macauley illustrated each part of the battle on set to help the production team. Executive producers Jacqueline Lesko and Cecil O'Connor led the teams responsible for the action scenes, which included 30–40 stunt performers—who attended a boot camp to familiarize themselves with the roles—and around 100 extras in prosthetics. A limited amount of stunts could be afforded each day, requiring additional digital enhancement.

Gower spoke with Mazin and Druckmann about changing the appearance of some infected to reflect the colder weather, making them look frostbitten. The prosthetics team worked on about 20 to 30 performers each day for close-up shots, focusing on those who would appear on camera, while Foley's team had almost 600 costume fittings for the episode, running three units (Alberta, Jackson, and snow scenes). The bloater stuntman, Glenn Ennis, was required to use cooling pads and a cooling tent before being hit with the flamethrower, which he performed around 12–14 times; Mylod thought they "almost gave him hypothermia". Several additional scenes, including more explosions of the infected, were filmed but cut from the final episode. Goldschmidt found Mazin's writing assisted in crafting visuals, and often referenced the game. She filmed the battle on the wall with three cameras, increasing to five when the horde enters Jackson. Concerned about the battle's lighting, she initially intended to cover the sets in silk, inspired by Memoirs of a Geisha (2005), but was limited by time and budget constraints, instead opting for construction cranes with large sheets of blackout to remove sunlight from the characters. Drawing from her work on House of the Dragon, Goldschmidt used Creamsource Vortex 8 when lighting the Jackson and lodge scenes.

Production moved to Alberta for sixteen days from March 18, including in Exshaw and Fortress Mountain Resort. Goldschmidt appreciated the resort staff's experience, as the location is often used for productions. Filming occurring during a blizzard at Fortress Mountain and in Whistler, during the scene in which Abby is chased by infected. The latter excluded some crew members (including the sound department) to avoid the risk of an avalanche. One scene only allowed around 10–15 people on the mountain, each wearing avalanche trackers, who had to climb with ropes to reach the mountaintop; Goldschmidt felt it was worth the result. The scene of Abby being crushed by infected was shot using a Ronin 4D moving on a Filmotechnic Technoscope F27 camera crane on the ground, instead of the series's usual Alexa 35 camera. Dever was worried she would fall and be trampled by the crowd. The infected horde was digitally enhanced from around 20–30 stunt performers to hundreds of creatures, with many using ragdoll simulation to "jiggle" akin to a concert. Mazin and Macauley conceived the alley standoff between Tommy and the bloater after main production took place. A set was constructed in April on a private property at Minaty Bay in Britannia Beach; filming occurred four months after principal photography, across five days—June 5, 7, 12, 13, and July 2—with smoke and flame pyrotechnics. Luna described the set as "labyrinthian, claustrophobic".

=== Visual effects ===
Eleven visual effects teams worked on the episode, including Clear Angle Studios, DNEG, Important Looking Pirates, Rise FX, Storm Studios, and Wētā FX. The episode used more than 600 visual effects shots, almost 200 more than the first-season episode "Endure and Survive". Visual effects supervisor Alex Wang was "gobsmacked" when reading the script due to its scope; he felt Mazin wanted the action sequence to be like The Lord of the Rings: The Two Towers's Battle of Helm's Deep. Mylod and first assistant director Dan Miller worked with Wang and Michael Cozens to create previsualization for the full action sequence. Mylod felt his experiences directing Game of Thrones prepared him for the physical production and visual effects. Visual effects supervisor Nick Epstein felt the visual clarity of Jackson in the daytime—as opposed the night setting of "Endure and Survive"—meant the effects had "nowhere to hide", with a higher "technical bar" than the first season. Animation supervisor Dennis Yoo found the increased crowd sizes was an added difficulty; around 400 unique infected were created digitally, with some wide shots featuring almost a thousand. Epstein felt the variation between each creature added "a sort of masked humanity", implying they each "have their own story". The distant infected were animated using Massive, with the pathing system adapted to match the unpredictable movement, while the horde chasing Abby was simulated using Autodesk Maya's Ragdoll plugin. Other software used included Houdini for animation, ZBrush for sculpting, and Foundry's Katana, Mari, and Nuke for lighting, texturing, and compositing, respectively.

Wētā FX worked on the infected. Every creature was created from scans of around 30 stunt actors with prosthetics, augmented with different clothing, hair, and fungus patterns to provide variations. Some performers forwent prosthetics—called "level-zero infected"—to allow the visual effects team to add more computer-generated imagery (CGI). Epstein faced difficulty in making their movement and collisions feel realistic, including with dead bodies, which consisted of several individual models, rather than one large one. Mazin wanted the creatures to interact to make their movement appear organic. Yoo captured additional performances with several actors, requiring many iterations to ensure their movements fit with different-sized characters and avoid performers who "run really silly" and "start looking like Monty Python". He was concerned about the dogs' movement and fur looking unrealistic. The team spent a day scanning and photographing the dogs, which was Epstein's favorite day on set. Around 21 simulations were present in the shot of the horde emerging from the snow, with several iterations undergone to match Mazin's "very specific vision", such as the rotation of the clicker's head as it rises; Mazin compared the sequence to an ant hive. The front of the Jackson set featured "one of the biggest green screens [Epstein had] ever seen"; the landscape shot was created entirely digitally based on photographs of Kananaskis Country. The unpredictable weather on set prompted the creation of a compositing-based weather control system for a more consistent appearance.

The bloater was crafted entirely using computer-generated imagery, with several changes from its first-season variant such as its increased size.

Wētā FX and Important Looking Pirates worked on the bloater sequence. While the bloater in "Endure and Survive" was initially performed practically before being replaced with CGI, Wang and his team created the bloater in "Through the Valley" with CGI first to better understand its design for usage in 60 shots. Its physique was based on those of bodybuilders. The team added genitalia to the bloater, not wanting it to appear like a Ken doll; Epstein felt they "spent way too much time talking about that", particularly in how the genitals move. Adam Basil, who worked on "Endure and Survive", returned to portray the bloater, while Ike Hamon returned to perform its movements through performance capture; the visual effects team were inspired by animals like alligators, which generally have slow movement but gain speed when cornered or attacking. Wang felt the bloater's motion was its most important element.

Several first-season textures required changes due to lighting differences; the texture painter who worked on the first season's bloater was asked to "about double" the texturing for the episode. Some alterations were made to the bloater: its head shape was changed and tendril sprouts added, based on photogrammetry of real fungus like Laetiporus, photographed by assets supervisor Pascal Raimbault; blue and purple colors were chosen and frost added to reflect the frigid environment; and it was made about 10% larger and more imposing, to immediately reflect its strength in comparison to the rest of the horde. Its natural armor was enhanced from the first season, used to show bullet damage without being destroyed entirely. Wang used Part II's gameplay as a guide to animating the bloater being burned. Several animations were tested; Wang wanted the audience to see the flame broaching the creature's multiple layers to make its death believable. The team researched several burning textures, such as marshmallows and macro photography of plastic; they found tomato the most appropriate due to its rippling and juice.

=== Editing ===
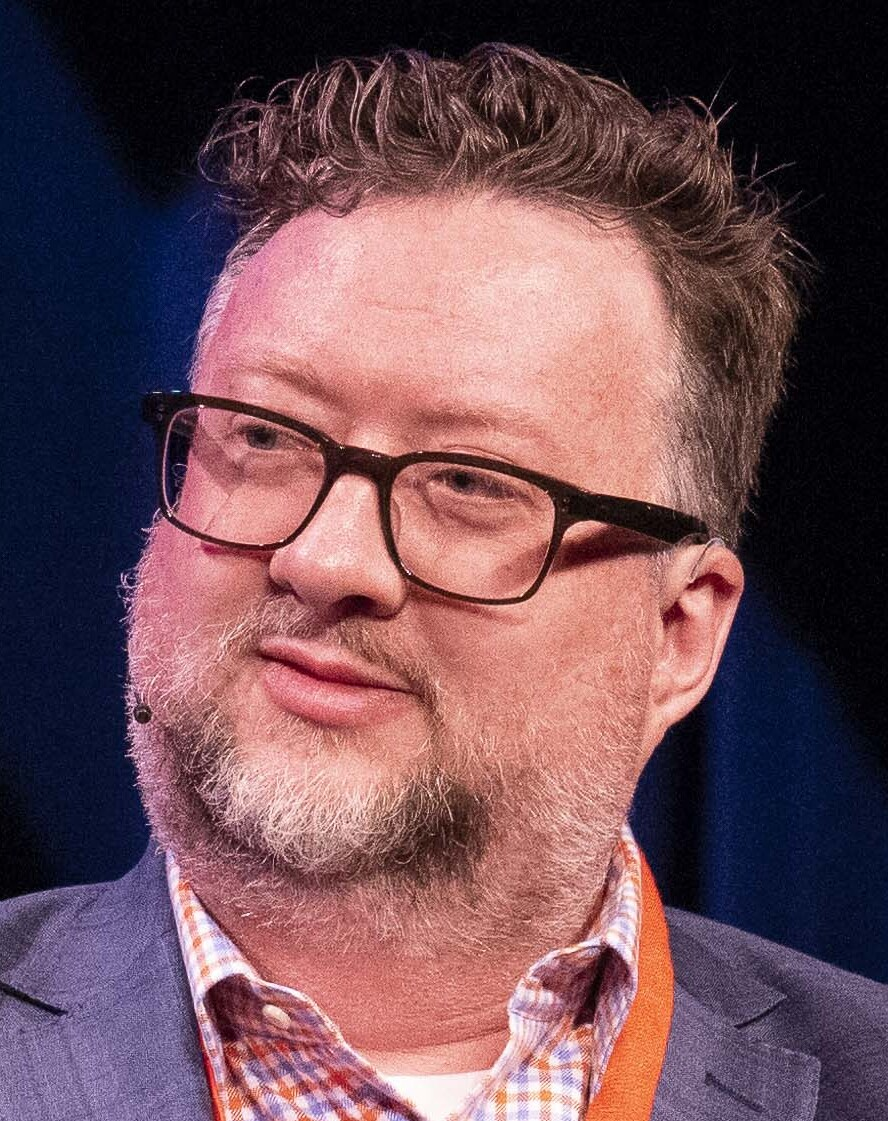
Lead editor Timothy A. Good edited "Through the Valley".

Timothy A. Good edited "Through the Valley". He began working on the episode in late February 2024 and the final mix was completed over a year later. He received more filming material than usual: 24 days of main production (three hours per day) and more than 30 days of second unit. Early edits cut between the Jackson battle and lodge scenes, but Good felt audiences cared more for the character-focused drama of the latter, prompting the Jackson scenes to be shuffled to earlier in the episode. The 17-minute battle sequence was trimmed to 11 minutes to focus on the main action and avoid lowering the stakes by showing infected deaths too early. Good wanted the scene to "apply maximum pressure" to its primary characters, Tommy and Maria.

Good considered Joel's death the most challenging scene to edit, particularly due to the pressure caused by its importance and the anxiety it would place on viewers. To better understand the most important elements, he re-edited the scene five times before presenting it to Mylod and Mazin; the latter recommended adding more violence from Ellie's perspective and a pause before Joel's death. The series typically avoids showing violence, as was true in Good's original cut which avoided showing Joel's death, but Mazin found it more shocking. Good did not want Abby to be sympathetic in his early cuts. When Abby first hears Joel's name, Good cut from a wide shot to a close-up of Abby's face to show the impact "as almost like a gut punch".

Ellie's approach to the lodge was edited with quick cuts to keep the scene moving but long enough to show her perspective; Good wanted audiences to feel Ellie's rage when she enters the room. Mylod filmed the actors in different ways, prompting Good to try and choose the most effective approach; he blended several versions to demonstrate Ellie's changing emotions throughout the scene, from commanding to quiet to angry. Mylod filmed entire scenes from different perspectives, like Joel's death from the viewpoint of one of Abby's crew, providing more footage for Good to cut to and allowing him to construct new story moments, such as Owen instructing Manny to let Ellie live. The audio of Joel telling Abby to "just do it already" was from a different take than shown in the episode. In a change from the usual process, Good edited the closing sequence to match the music, which forced him to shorten the scene between Tommy and Maria; he limited it to the most important element, showing Maria comforting a broken Tommy. Good requested the sound of Joel's body dragged across the snow to allow viewers to feel his presence.

== Reception ==
=== Broadcast and ratings ===
The episode aired on HBO on April 20, 2025. On linear television, the episode had 643,000 viewers, with a 0.16 ratings share. The series was the most-viewed across all streaming services for the weeks preceding and following the episode, and it was the most in-demand show for the week in Canada following "Through the Valley", with more than 76 times the average demand for television shows.

=== Critical response ===
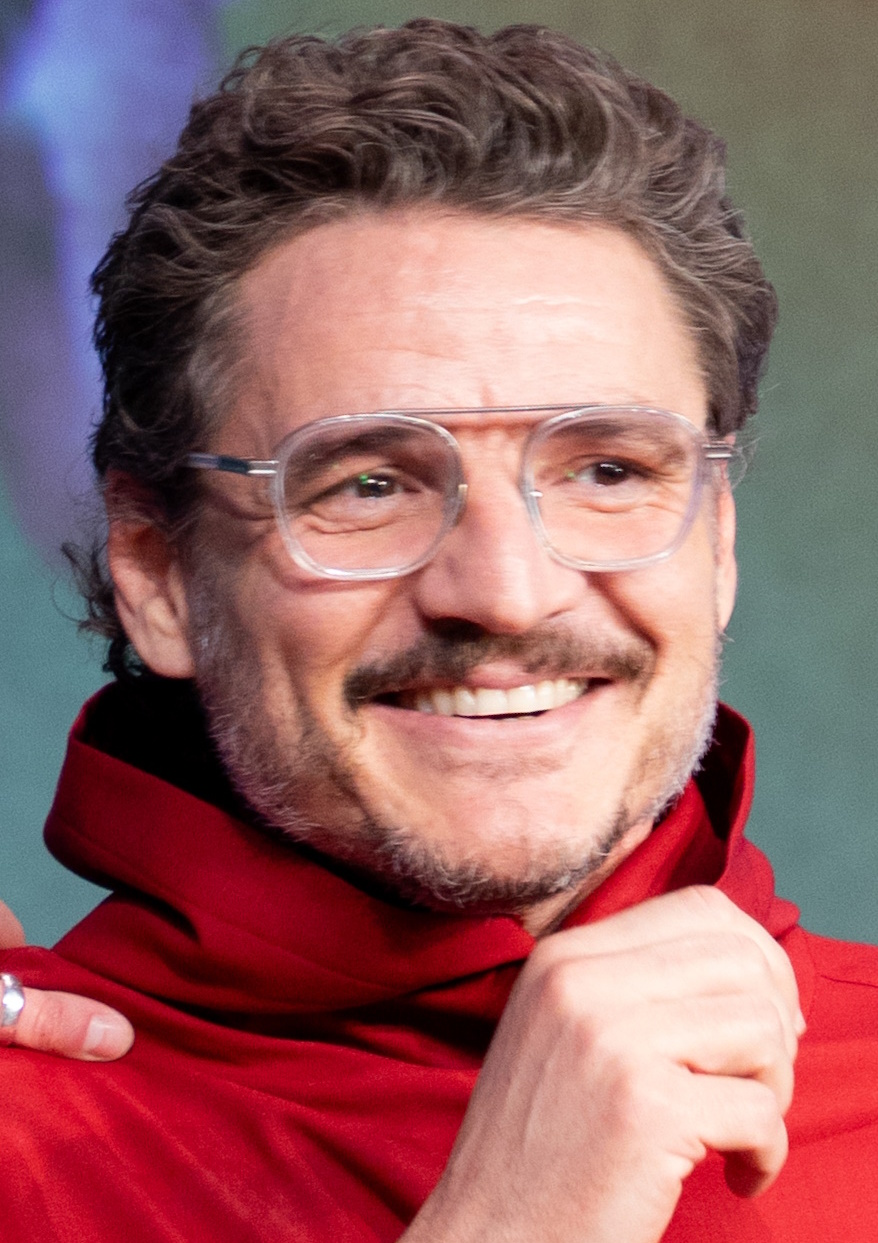
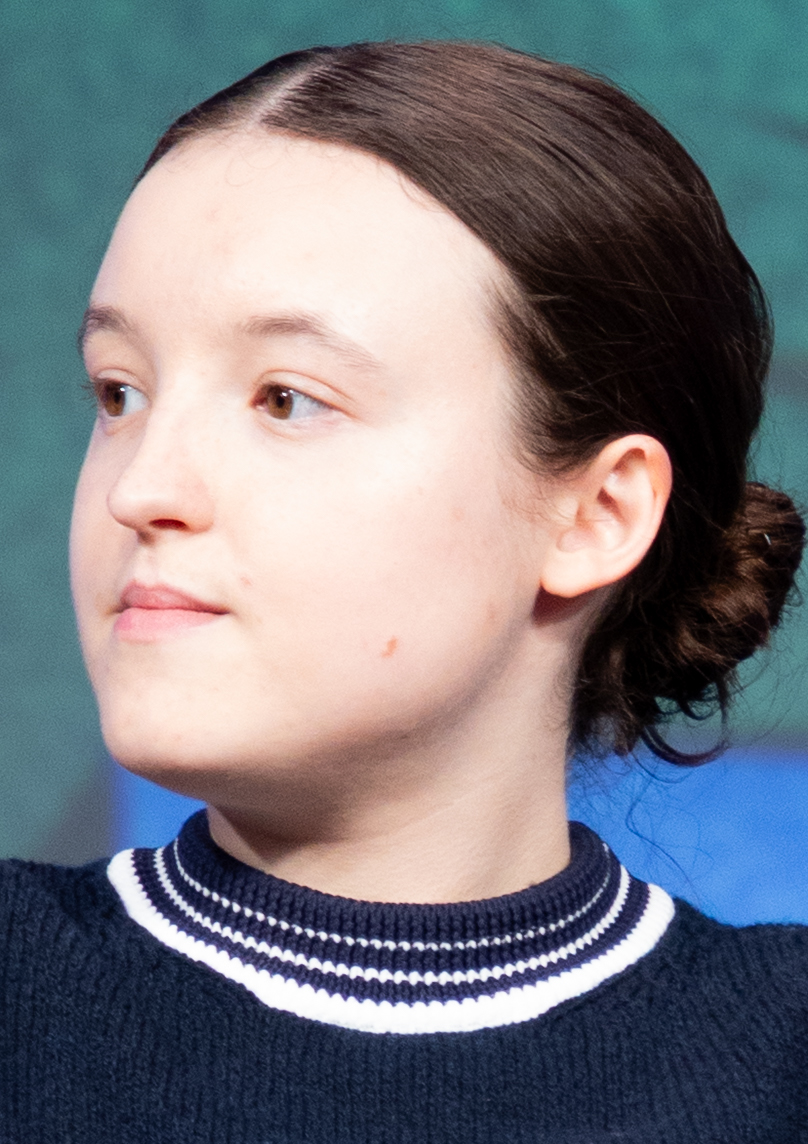
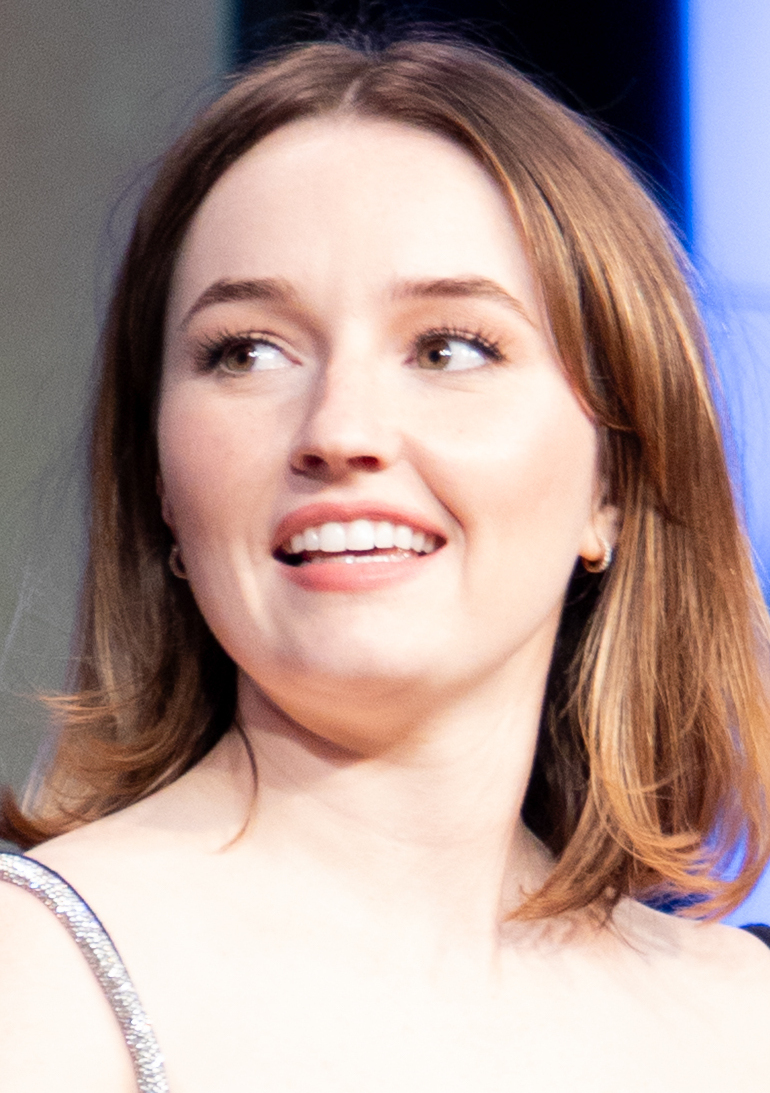
Critics praised the performances of (left to right) Pedro Pascal, Bella Ramsey, and Kaitlyn Dever.

"Through the Valley" has an approval rating of 97% on review aggregator Rotten Tomatoes based on 30 reviews, with an average rating of 9 out of 10. The website's critical consensus called the episode "poignantly tense". Nerdist's Michael Walsh called it "TV at its absolute best in every way". Engadget's Nathan Ingraham felt the simultaneous depiction of Jackson's battle and Joel's death "is a testament to the writers, directors and cast", though IGN's Simon Cardy felt they were "two stories that don't quite give each other enough room to breathe". The Hollywood Reporter's Daniel Fienberg named it among the year's best episodes, calling it a "rare chapter capable of matching a daunting avalanche of pre-episode hype and post-episode discourse".

Critics praised Ramsey's performance for depicting grief and fury, especially in Ellie's screams as Joel is killed; TVLine's Kimberly Roots named Ramsey the Performer of the Week and lauded their ability to communicate "Ellie's despair at realizing there's no time to fix things" with Joel. The A.V. Club's Caroline Siede felt Ramsey effectively captured both Ellie's "maturity and childlike innocence". Dever's performance was lauded for her intensity and ferocity, which many felt compensated for Abby's less muscular physique from the game; The Telegraph's Chris Bennion called Dever's performance "a powerhouse", grounding Abby's actions in reality, and TheWrap's Alex Welch felt it "leaves no question why she was the right actress for the role". IGN's Cardy called Pascal's performance "note-perfect", citing the "acceptance in his eyes" at his death; Nerdist's Walsh found his final look at Ellie memorable, and praised Luna's nuanced emotion.

The A.V. Club's Siede compared the writing to a Greek tragedy, calling its plot conveniences "purposefully devastating rather than structurally lazy". Polygon's Zosha Millman appreciated that Abby unwittingly unleashing the horde on Jackson demonstrates the wider societal implications of her revenge quest. Several reviewers praised Joel's death scene for balancing Abby's pain and brutality; Engadget's Ingraham lauded its juxtaposition with the Jackson attack for adding layers of grief, though Los Angeles Times's Tracy Brown found it unsubtle that Jackson "is destroyed by infected monsters while Joel ... is killed by human monsters". IGN's Cardy felt the action overshadowed Joel's death and distracted from its events with unknown characters. Kotaku's Kenneth Shepard criticized the pacing and noted the subtext is made too obvious by removing Abby's ambiguity and depicting Ellie embracing Joel's body. The Atlantic's Shirley Li felt Abby's monologue removed the shock of her killing Joel and the "unrelenting" Jackson assault was added to compensate, causing the series to "become more circular and suffocating in its storytelling". Many reviewers found the shock of Joel's death reminiscent of Ned Stark's or the Red Wedding in Game of Thrones.

Mylod's direction and Goldschmidt's cinematography were praised for their focus on characters, particularly during the action sequences and Joel's death. Several critics lauded Abby's chase sequence, finding the cinematography terrifying in its claustrophobia; IGN's Cardy felt it demonstrated the infected's "rabid relentlessness" and Kotaku's Shepard was reminded of the game. The A.V. Club's Siede called the crane shot of Ellie embracing Joel "beautiful and devastating", and IndieWire's Ben Travers felt the final shot reflected Ellie's view of the future being limited by her focus on the past. Several reviewers considered the action sequence the series's most epic and intense, favorably comparing it to Game of Thrones and The Lord of the Rings: The Two Towers. The Times's James Jackson compared it to Saving Private Ryan's opening sequence, and Empire's John Nugent called it "exceptional grand scale cinematic television". The A.V. Club's Siede was impressed by how the scenes made her care more deeply for Tommy and Maria, and Vulture's Keith Phipps felt the preparation scenes made the action more effective. Conversely, IGN's Cardy considered the sequence, while beautifully shot, an overcorrection of the first season's scarce action, and Rolling Stone's Alan Sepinwall found it "exciting" but "less compelling than it should be" due to its unfamiliar characters.

=== Accolades ===
Of the season's 35 submissions for the 77th Primetime Emmy Awards, over a third were for "Through the Valley". At the Creative Arts Emmy Awards, the episode won Outstanding Sound Editing for a Comedy or Drama Series (One Hour), (Note: Nominees: supervising sound editor Michael J. Benavente; sound designer Chris Terhune; dialogue editor Joe Schiff; supervising sound effects editor Christopher Battaglia; sound effects editors Mitchell Lestner, Jacob Flack, Odin Benitez, and James Miller; supervising Foley editor Randy Wilson; Foley editors Justin Helle and Ron Mellegers; music editor Maarten Hofmeijer; and Foley artists Stefan Fraticelli, Brandon Bak, and Jason Charbonneau) and was nominated for Outstanding Sound Mixing for a Comedy or Drama Series (One Hour) (Note: Nominees: re-recording mixers Marc Fishman and Samuel Ejnes; production mixer Chris Duesterdiek; and ADR mixers Jeffrey Roy and Tami Treadwell) while Dever and Good were nominated for Outstanding Guest Actress in a Drama Series and Outstanding Picture Editing in a Drama Series, respectively. Mazin and Mylod were nominated for Best Writing and Best Directing in a Drama Series, respectively, at the 5th Astra TV Awards.

The episode was nominated for Outstanding Achievement in Sound Editing – Broadcast Long Form Effects and Foley (Note: Nominees: supervising sound editor Michael J. Benavente; supervising Foley editor Randy Wilson; sound designers Christopher Battaglia and Chris Terhune; sound effects editors Mitchell Lestner, Jacob Flack, and Odin Benitez; dialogue editor Joe Schiff; Foley editors Justin Helle and Ron Mellegers; and Foley artists Stefan Fraticelli, Brandon Bak, Jason Charbonneau, and Biko Gogaladze) and Maarten Hofmeijer for Outstanding Achievement in Music Editing at the Golden Reel Awards 2025. The episode received two nominations for Best Stunt Performance (Note: Nominees: Stunt coordinator Marny Eng; fire coordinator Colin Decker; and stunt performers Leanne Buchanan, Colby Chartrand, Kory Grim, Adrian Hein, Coulton Jackson, Trevor Jones, Anthony Moyer, Matthew Mylrea, Angela Uyeda, and Jonathan Vellner; Stunt coordinator Marny Eng; fire coordinator Colin Decker; and stunt performer Jonathan Vellner) at the UBCP/ACTRA Awards, of which Marny Eng, Colin Decker, and Jonathan Vellner won one. It won Outstanding Compositing and Lighting in an Episode (Note: Nominees: Tobias Wiesner, Mark Julien, Owen Longstaff, and Brendan Naylor) at the 24th Visual Effects Society Awards, where it was also nominated for Outstanding Visual Effects in a Photoreal Episode (Note: Nominees: Alex Wang, Fiona Campbell Westgate, Nick Epstein, Philip Engström, and Joel Whist) and Outstanding Effects Simulations in an Episode, Commercial, Game Cinematic, or Real-Time Project (Note: Nominees: Duarte Victorino, Claudio Gonzalez, Andre Castelao, and Igor Bondar) for the infected horde.
