= Anatoliy Kokush =

Ukrainian inventor and film executive

- Анатолій Кокуш
- Born: 25 May 1951 (age 75)
- Occupations: Film engineer; businessman; inventor

Anatoliy Akymovych Kokush (Ukrainian: Анатолій Акимович Кокуш; born 25 May 1951) is a Ukrainian Krymchak film engineer, businessman, and inventor. In the 1990s, he developed a gyro-stabilized car-mounted camera crane known as a U-Crane.

In 2005, he was awarded two Academy Awards. The awards were in the Scientific and Engineering Award category: one was awarded "for the concept and development of the Russian Arm gyro-stabilized camera crane and the Flight Head"; the other was awarded "for the concept and development of the Cascade series of motion picture cranes". Kokush has also been recognized by Ukraine's then First Lady Kateryna Yushchenko for his contributions to Ukrainian cinema and around the world.

Kokush graduated from the Leningrad Institute of Film Engineers in 1974. He then started working for Dovzhenko Film Studios in Kyiv. He was born in Kerch.

== Gyro-stabilized car-mounted camera crane ==
In the 1980s, Kokush founded the film and television company Filmotechnic, based in Kyiv. He explained that the machine known as the "Russian Arm" is actually called Autorobot, and was given the nickname as a joke in the early nineties, when Americans in Hollywood joked that "the Russian Arm is back in America again". Filmotechnic provided Travelling Cascade Cranes, Flight Heads and Russian Arms to major Hollywood pictures such as Titanic, War of the Worlds, Casanova, and also the wuxia film Hero, many Russian blockbusters, as well as Ukrainian films. Other films include The Italian Job, Ocean's Twelve, King Arthur, Kingdom of Heaven, Bean: The Movie, Transformers, Iron Man 2, and many other huge box office hits.

On 1 March 2022, in light of the Russian invasion of Ukraine, Filmotechnic officially renamed the gyro-stabilized crane as U-Crane, "in honor of country of origin and their heroic fight against Russian aggression."
