= The Last of Us season 2 =

The Last of Us
- Season 2
- Cover art of the DVD and Blu-ray release
- Showrunners: Craig Mazin; Neil Druckmann
- Starring: Pedro Pascal; Bella Ramsey; Gabriel Luna; Isabela Merced; Young Mazino
- No. of episodes: 7

Release
- Original network: HBO
- Original release: April 13 – May 25, 2025

Season chronology
- ← Previous; Season 1 Next → Season 3

The second season of the American post-apocalyptic drama television series The Last of Us was originally broadcast on HBO between April and May 2025. Based on the video game franchise developed by Naughty Dog, the season is set twenty-five years into a pandemic caused by a mass fungal infection, which causes its hosts to transform into zombie-like creatures and collapses society. The second season, based on the first half of the 2020 game The Last of Us Part II, follows Joel (Pedro Pascal) and Ellie (Bella Ramsey) five years after the events of the first season, after they have settled into Jackson, Wyoming, with Joel's brother Tommy (Gabriel Luna) and Ellie's friends Dina (Isabela Merced) and Jesse (Young Mazino).

HBO renewed The Last of Us for a second season less than two weeks after the series premiered in January 2023. Co-creators Craig Mazin and Neil Druckmann were joined in the writers' room by Halley Gross and Bo Shim; Druckmann wrote and co-directed the games, and Gross co-wrote Part II. Principal photography took place in British Columbia from February to August 2024. Druckmann, Mazin, and Peter Hoar returned to direct the seven episodes alongside newcomers Kate Herron, Nina Lopez-Corrado, Mark Mylod, and Stephen Williams. Gustavo Santaolalla and David Fleming returned to compose the score.

Critics felt the season reinforced The Last of Us as the best video game adaptation, praising the action sequences, direction, performances, production design, and writing, though some criticized the pacing and considered the story incomplete. The season was subject to review bombing amid audience criticism. It was nominated for several awards, including 17 Primetime Emmy Awards. Across linear channels and Max, the season premiere was watched by 5.3 million viewers on the first day, a 13% increase from the first-season premiere; by May, the series averaged almost 37 million global viewers per episode.

== Cast and characters ==
=== Main ===
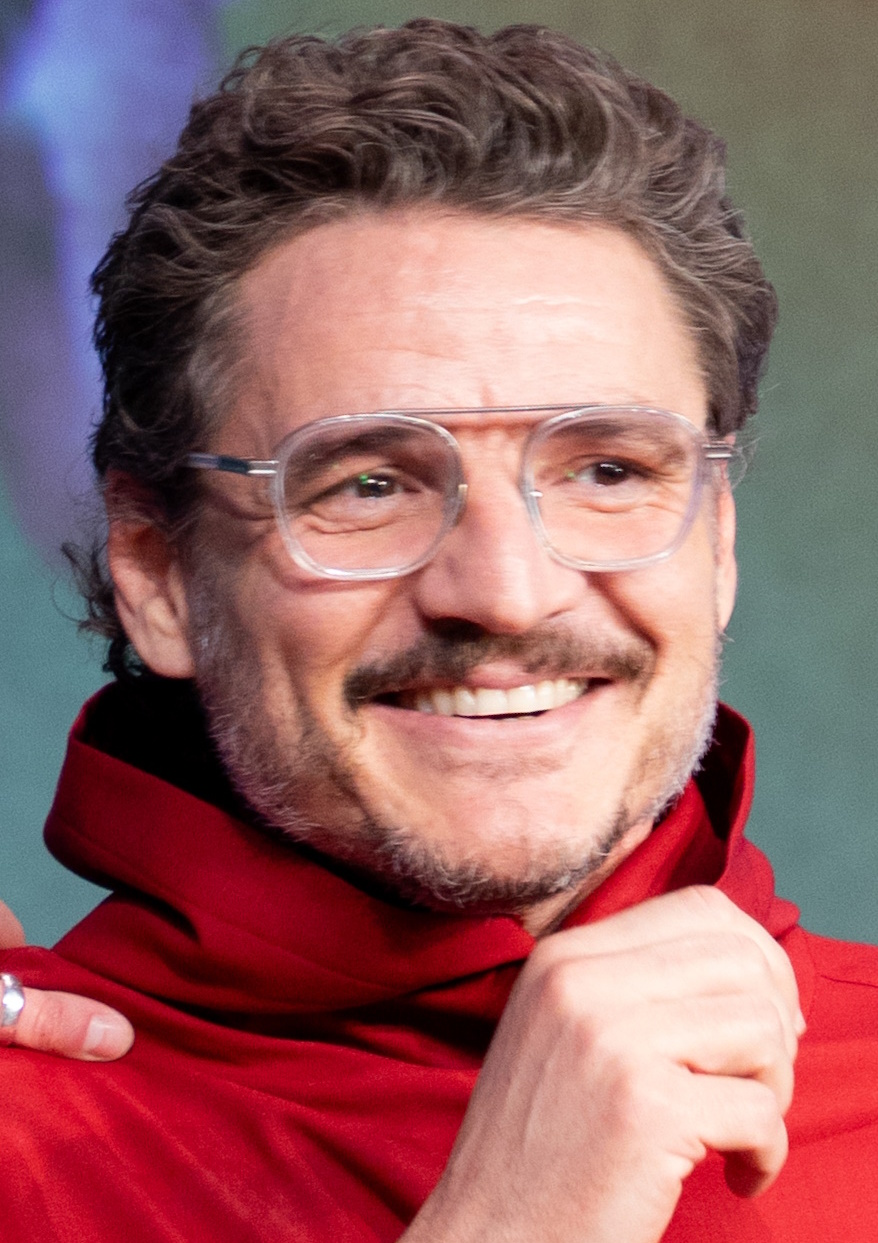
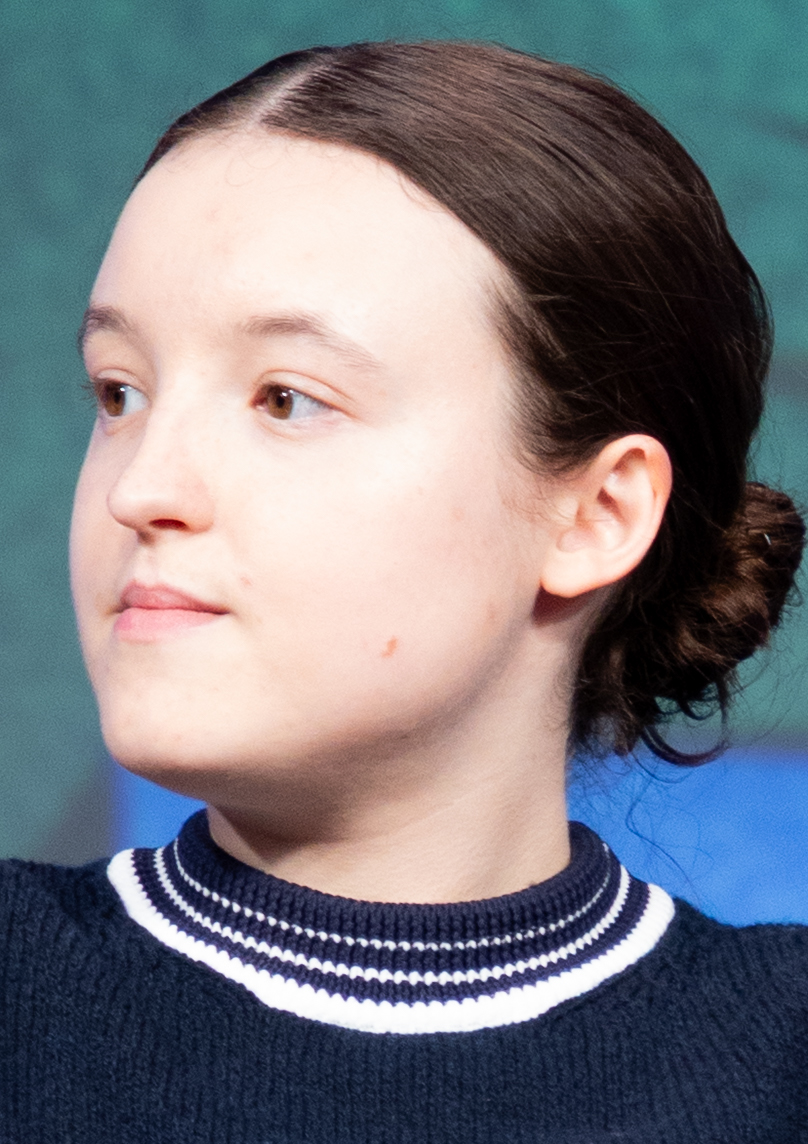
Pedro Pascal and Bella Ramsey reprise their roles as lead characters Joel and Ellie.
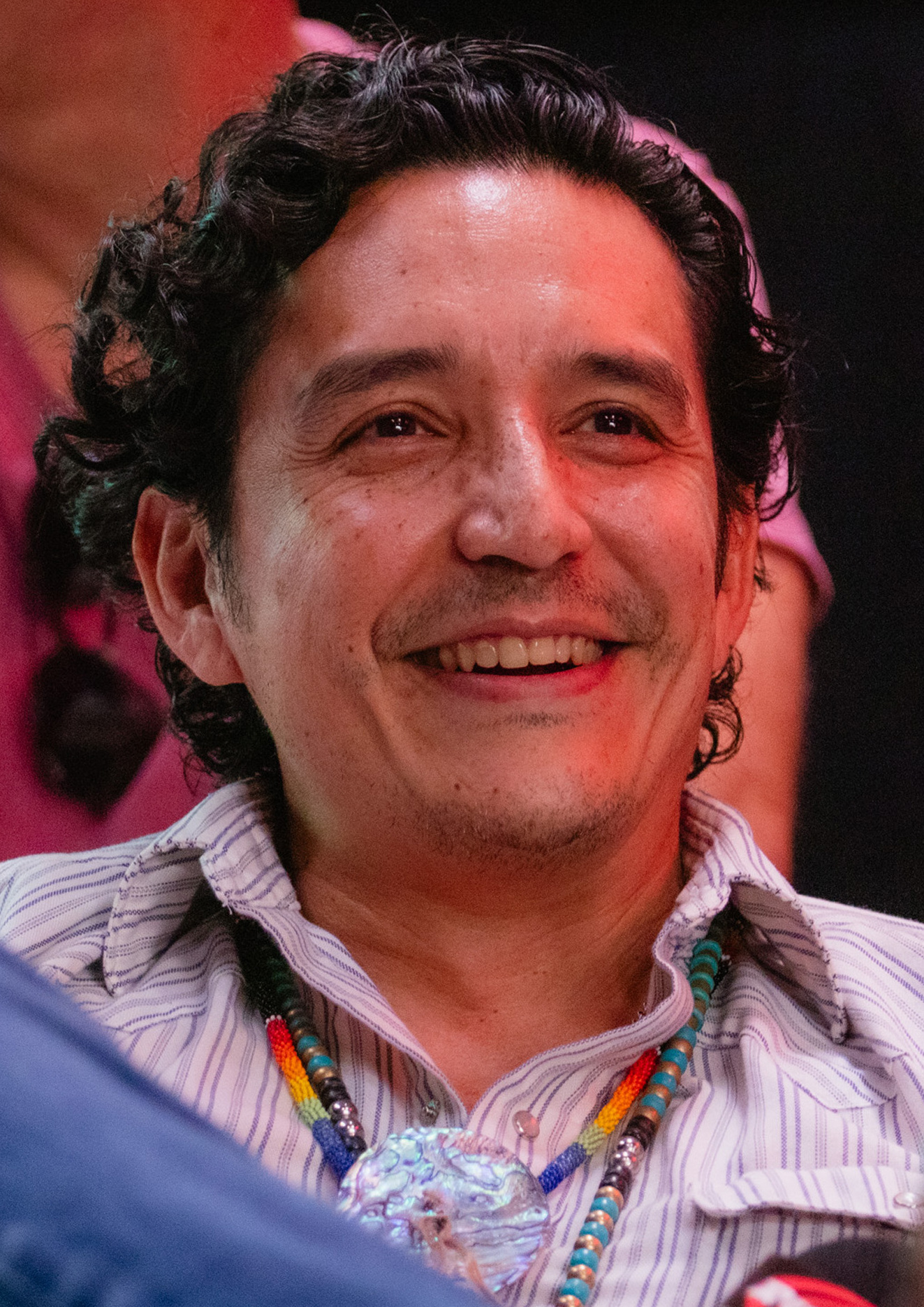
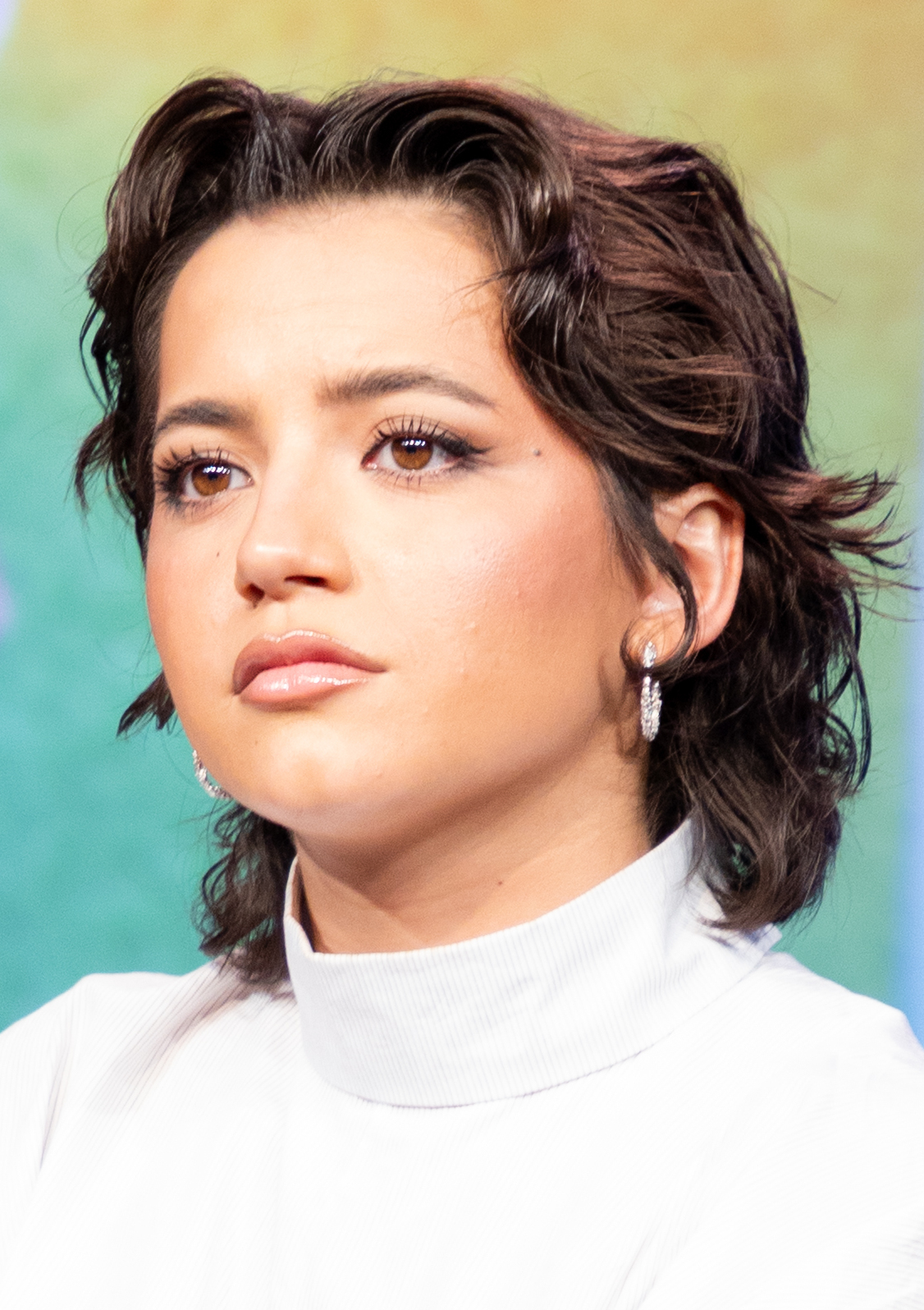
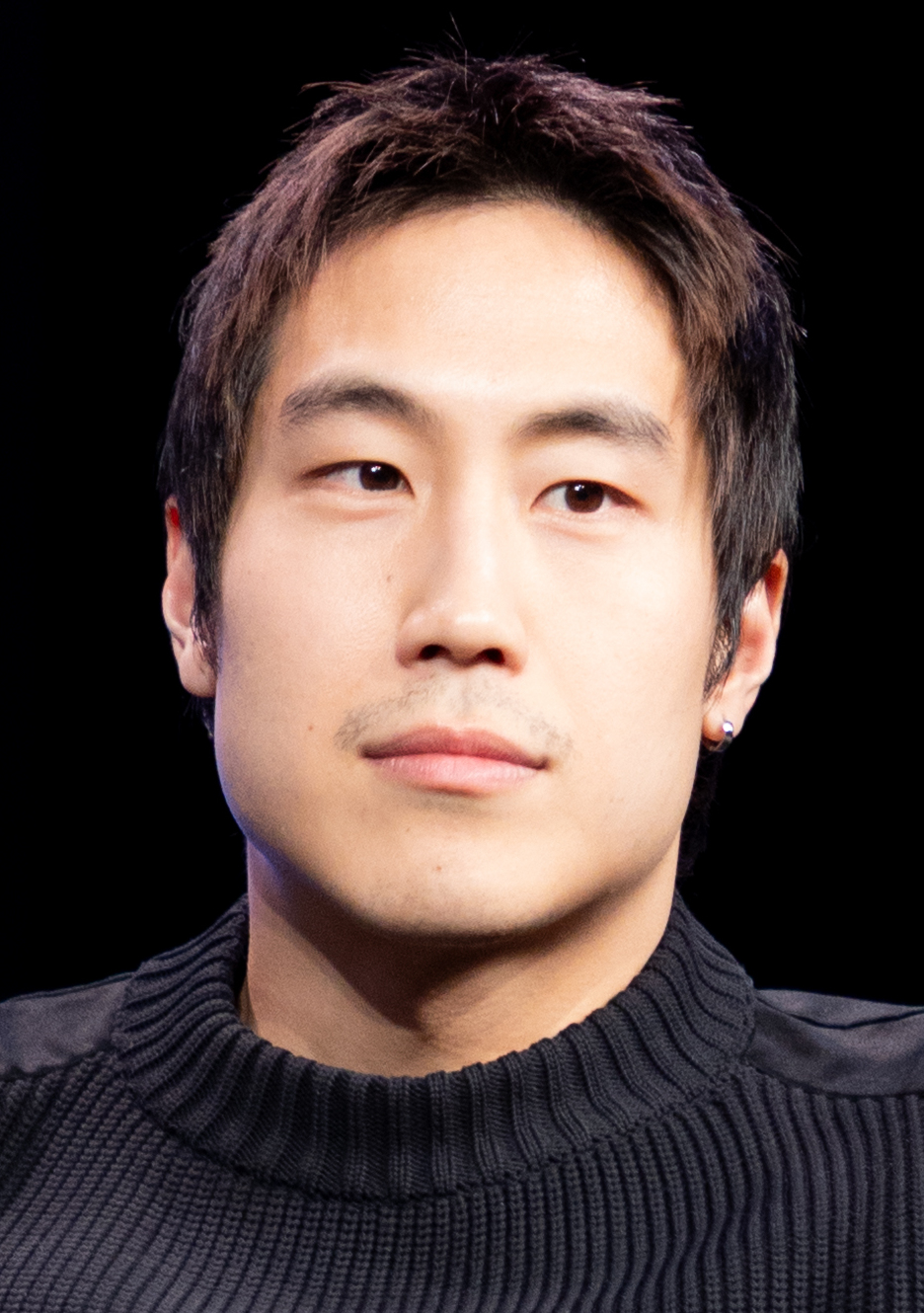
Gabriel Luna became a series regular in the second season alongside new cast members Isabela Merced and Young Mazino.
- Pedro Pascal as Joel Miller, a hardened middle-aged survivor. Joel is portrayed as more physically vulnerable in the series compared to the games. His relationship with Ellie has become strained since he lied to her at the end of the first season.
- Bella Ramsey as Ellie, a 19-year-old who is immune to the Cordyceps infection. She has become tougher, like Joel, but maintains her humor. As she grows up in Jackson, she becomes distanced from Joel; she gets a tattoo, learns to play guitar, and develops queer relationships.
- Gabriel Luna as Tommy Miller, Joel's younger brother who maintains idealism in hoping for a better world. A former Firefly, Tommy gave up on their cause and runs a commune with his wife Maria, with whom he has a son named Benjamin, nicknamed "Benji".
- Isabela Merced as Dina, Ellie's romantic interest and Jesse's ex-girlfriend. She is a freewheeling spirit with a loyalty towards Ellie, which is challenged by the world's brutality.
- Young Mazino as Jesse, Dina's ex-boyfriend and an important member of Jackson whose selflessness sometimes comes at a cost. Having lost everything prior to joining Jackson, he values its sense of community and works hard to ensure it is not lost.

=== Recurring ===
- Kaitlyn Dever as Abby, a Washington Liberation Front (WLF) soldier and former Firefly who seeks revenge against Joel for the death of her father and subsequently has her worldview challenged
- Rutina Wesley as Maria, a co-leader of the survivors in Jackson. She is Tommy's wife and Benjamin's mother. Formerly an assistant district attorney, Maria is calm and merciful.
- Robert John Burke as Seth, a former police officer who runs a bar in Jackson. He is homophobic, leading to conflict with Joel, Ellie, and Dina.
- Spencer Lord as Owen, a WLF member and former Firefly. He is a gentle person whose physical strength forces him to fight enemies he does not hate.
- Tati Gabrielle as Nora, a WLF military medic and former Firefly who has difficulty accepting her past behavior
- Ariela Barer as Mel, a former Firefly and Owen's girlfriend. She is a doctor in the WLF committed to her role while struggling with the realities of war, reluctant to hurt others.
- Danny Ramirez as Manny, a WLF member and former Firefly. A loyal soldier who fears failing his friends, he maintains a jovial attitude despite the pain of his past.
- Catherine O'Hara as Gail, Joel's therapist and Eugene's wife. She is cynical, not deceived by Joel's posturing.

=== Guest ===
- Noah Lamanna as Kat, Ellie's ex and the only other openly queer member of Jackson. In the video game, Kat (spelled "Cat") is only mentioned and depicted in a photograph and drawing.
- Jeffrey Wright as Isaac Dixon, the ruthless leader of the WLF and a former high-ranking sergeant for the Federal Disaster Response Agency (FEDRA). The WLF face a war in their pursuit for liberty. Wright reprises his role from the video game.
- Alanna Ubach as Hanrahan, a high-ranking WLF member. The character is original to the series.
- Josh Peck as Janowicz, a FEDRA soldier in Seattle under Isaac's command. He jokes with other soldiers about the harassment and abuse of civilians.
- Ben Ahlers as Burton, a loyal and hardened WLF soldier. He was recruited by Isaac as a new FEDRA recruit.
- Hettienne Park as Elise Park, a WLF sergeant whose soldier son was infected through spores. The character is original to the series.
- Tony Dalton as Javier Miller, Joel and Tommy's father. An original character to the series, he is a police officer with a history of using violence to discipline his sons, having been abused even more violently by his own father as a child.
- Joe Pantoliano as Eugene Lynden, Gail's husband. He is kind, behaving with innocence and purity. The character is only seen in a photograph in the game.

== Episodes ==
No. overall	No. in season	Title	Directed by	Written by	Original release date	U.S. viewers (millions)
10	1	"Future Days"	Craig Mazin	Craig Mazin	April 13, 2025	0.938
Five years after Joel massacred Fireflies at the Salt Lake City hospital and rescued Ellie, (Note: As depicted in the first season finale "Look for the Light" (2023)) they have settled in Jackson, Wyoming. The time interval has left their relationship strained, for which Joel receives counseling from psychotherapist Gail. She admits her resentment towards Joel for killing her husband, Eugene, and pushes him to tell the truth. Joel admits to saving Ellie. On patrol, Ellie and Dina encounter a new kind of "stalker" infected in a supermarket and warn Jackson's council. Ellie and Dina kiss at a New Year's Eve dance, prompting a homophobic slur from the bar owner, Seth. Joel intervenes and shoves him, which angers Ellie. She chastises Joel and he leaves. Infected tendrils begin to enter Jackson through a broken pipe while Abby—who swore revenge on Joel for the hospital massacre—approaches the town with her friends, Owen, Nora, Mel, and Manny.
11	2	"Through the Valley"	Mark Mylod	Craig Mazin	April 20, 2025	0.643
Abby shelters with her team in a lodge near Jackson and considers a plan to kill Joel, but the others secretly consider retreating, concerned about Jackson's security. While Abby scopes out the town, she accidentally awakens a large horde of infected hiding under the snow. She escapes narrowly and is saved by Joel, on patrol with Dina. The horde attacks Jackson, which suffers heavy casualties in the ensuing battle. Abby brings Joel and Dina to the lodge, where she sedates Dina and corners Joel, revealing the Firefly doctor Joel killed was her father. Abby shoots Joel in the leg and brutally beats him with a golf club. Ellie enters the lodge but is restrained by Abby's party, who force her to watch helplessly as Abby stabs Joel in the neck and kills him. Ellie swears to kill Abby in return as her group leaves. While Jackson begins to recover from the battle, Ellie, Dina, and Jesse return home with Joel's body.
12	3	"The Path"	Peter Hoar	Craig Mazin	April 27, 2025	0.768
Three months later, Dina tells Ellie that the group who killed Joel—members of the Washington Liberation Front (WLF)—are based in Seattle. At a town hall meeting, Ellie tries to persuade the council to send a group to Seattle out of justice, not revenge, but they oppose. Ellie gathers weapons to leave for Seattle alone but Dina joins and helps her prepare. Seth, who vocally supported Ellie during the town hall, helps them leave Jackson. The next morning, Ellie leaves coffee beans on Joel's grave. Later, she and Dina encounter a group of dead Seraphites—a religious group based in Seattle—including a young child, the sight of which causes Dina to vomit. They arrive in Seattle and note the lack of WLF members. Elsewhere, a convoy of WLF soldiers march through Seattle with armored vehicles.
13	4	"Day One"	Kate Herron	Craig Mazin	May 4, 2025	0.774
In 2018, Isaac kills his FEDRA squad and switches his allegiance to the WLF. Eleven years later, now the WLF's leader, he tortures and kills a Seraphite who refuses to share information about his group. Taking refuge in a music store, Ellie serenades Dina with a guitar, a skill she learned from Joel. At night, they find several WLF soldiers brutally killed by the Seraphites. They escape a WLF backup squad and an infected horde in the subway, but Ellie takes a bite to save Dina from infection. As they hide in an abandoned theater, a heartbroken Dina prepares to shoot Ellie, who explains her immunity. Dina confesses to Ellie that she is pregnant, and they have sex. The next morning, they learn by radio that Nora is based at the Lakehill hospital. Dina vows to finish the mission with Ellie.
14	5	"Feel Her Love"	Stephen Williams	Craig Mazin	May 11, 2025	0.652
En route to the hospital, Ellie and Dina encounter more dead Seraphites. Ellie questions bringing Dina, but Dina reaffirms her commitment to their revenge quest. They are ambushed by stalkers in an abandoned warehouse and saved by Jesse, who traveled to Seattle with Tommy to rescue them. Pursued by the WLF, the three enter a local park and witness the Seraphites disembowel a WLF soldier. Dina is shot in the leg with an arrow, and Jesse carries her out of the park while Ellie creates a diversion. After evading the Seraphites, Ellie continues to the hospital and corners Nora in a quarantined basement filled with airborne Cordyceps spores. Nora, becoming infected, realizes Ellie was the immune girl from the Salt Lake City hospital. Ellie shares that she already knows what Joel did to save her, and beats Nora with a pipe to learn Abby's location.
15	6	"The Price"	Neil Druckmann	Neil Druckmann & Halley Gross & Craig Mazin	May 18, 2025	0.701
A series of flashbacks show the decline of Joel and Ellie's relationship: for her fifteenth birthday, he gifts her a homemade guitar; on her sixteenth, he takes her to an abandoned museum, where she is enamored with its space exhibits; on her seventeenth, he angrily interrupts a moment of intimacy between Ellie and Kat, causing tension; on her nineteenth, he takes her out on her first patrol. They rescue Gail's husband Eugene, who has been bitten. Joel promises to escort him back to Jackson to say goodbye to Gail, but executes him instead. Joel then lies, telling Gail that Eugene chose to kill himself rather than endanger her. Ellie reveals the truth, deducing that Joel also lied about the Fireflies. Nine months later, after the New Year's Eve dance, Ellie confronts Joel. He tearfully confesses the truth about his actions at the hospital but admits he has no regrets. Ellie doubts that she can forgive him but pledges to try.
16	7	"Convergence"	Nina Lopez-Corrado	Neil Druckmann & Halley Gross & Craig Mazin	May 25, 2025	0.680
Ellie regroups with Dina and Jesse, shaken by her own brutality against Nora. She shares a clue from Nora about Abby's location, then divulges the story of Joel's massacre to Dina, who suggests they return home. Jesse and Ellie search for Tommy, but Ellie deduces that Abby is hiding in an aquarium and leaves to pursue her. Ellie is captured and nearly executed by the Seraphites, but escapes to the aquarium to find Owen and Mel. She holds them at gunpoint and demands Abby's location. When Owen grabs a gun, Ellie fatally shoots him and the bullet strikes Mel, who reveals that she is pregnant; she asks Ellie to save the baby via a caesarean, to no avail. Jesse and Tommy recover a devastated Ellie and bring her back to the theater. Later, Abby ambushes them, killing Jesse, injuring Tommy, and holding Ellie at gunpoint. A gunshot rings out. Three days earlier, Manny wakes up Abby, having both been summoned by Isaac.

== Production ==
=== Development ===
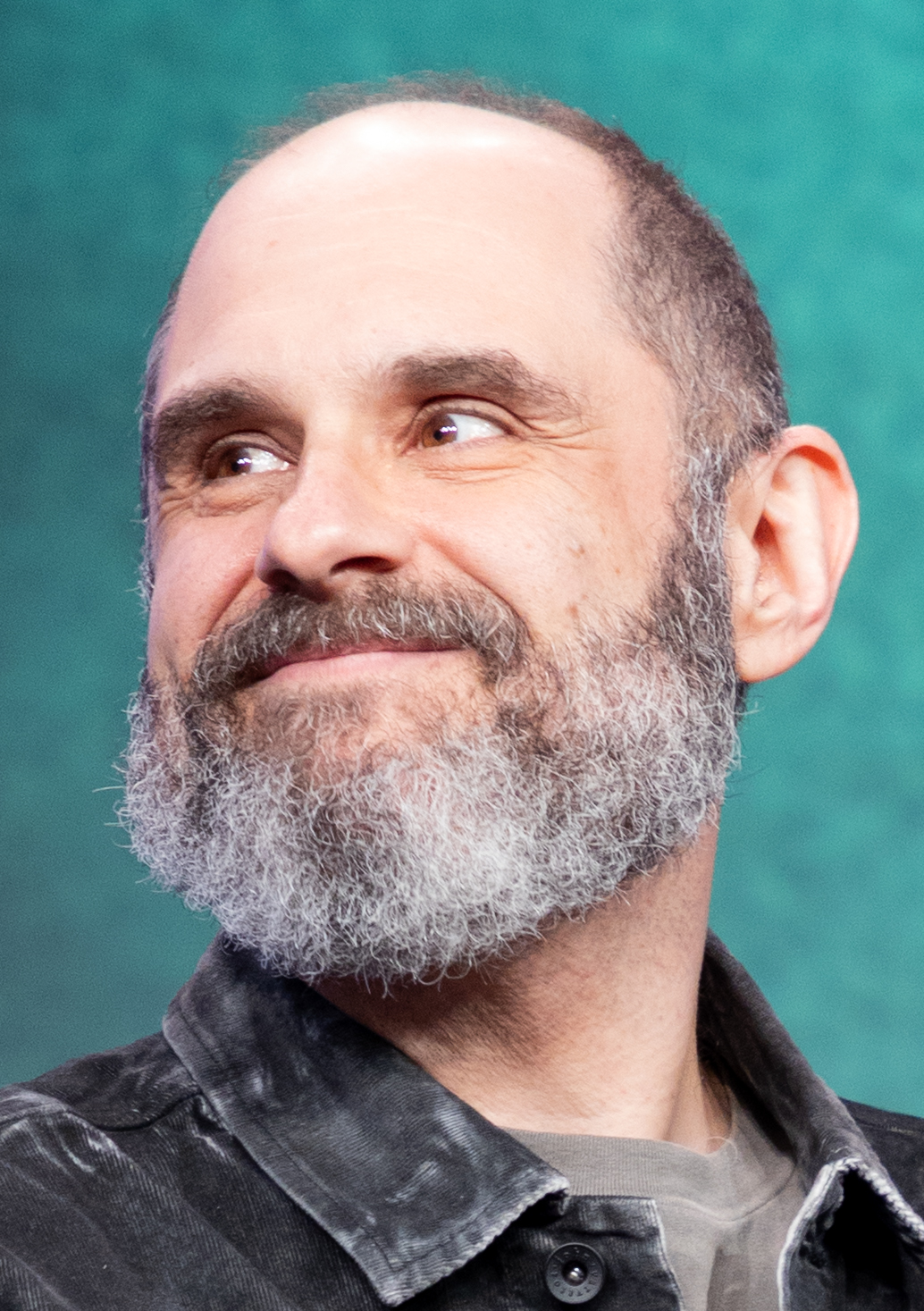
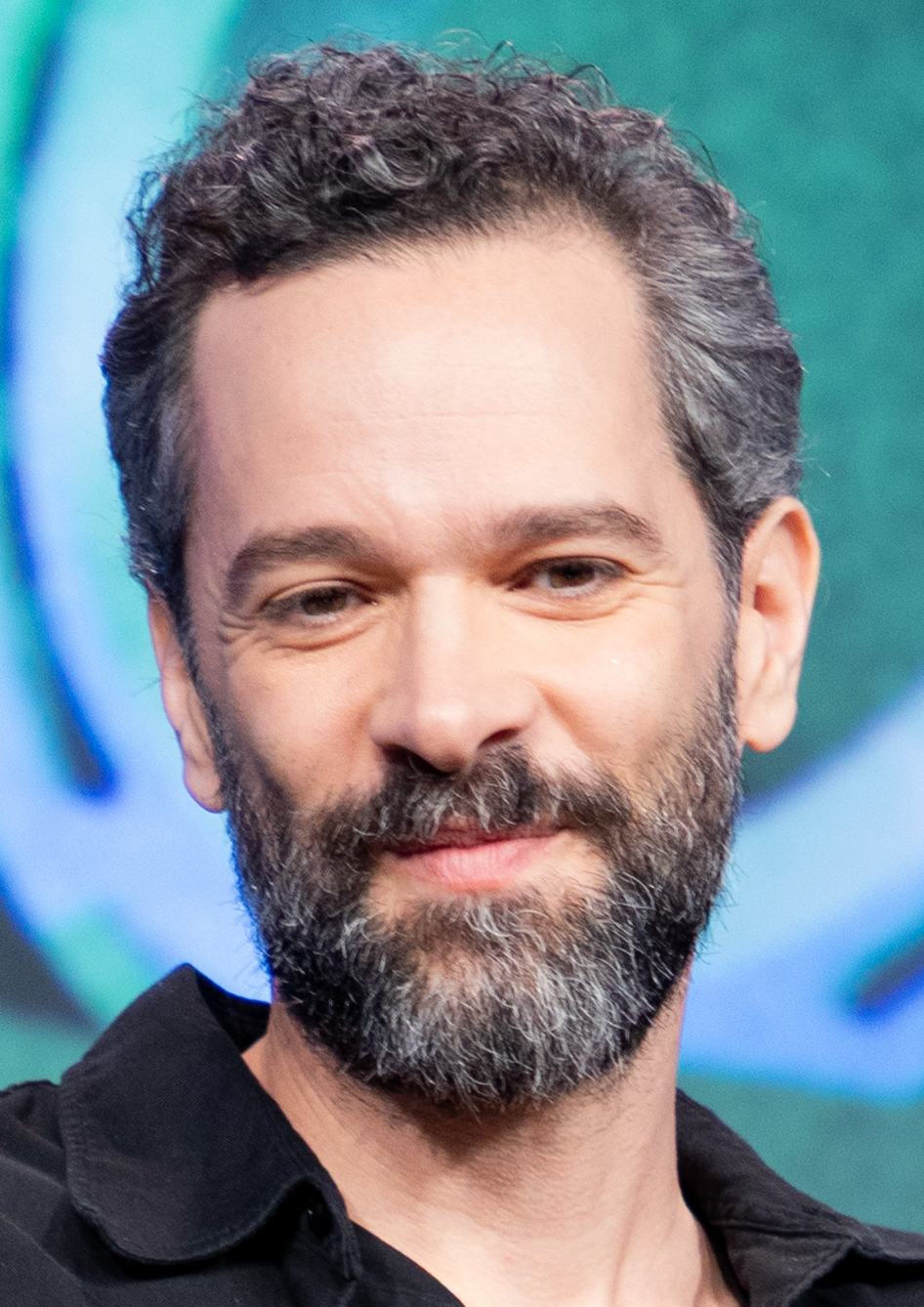
The television series was created by Craig Mazin (left) and Neil Druckmann (right). Druckmann wrote and co-directed the video games.

HBO renewed The Last of Us for a second season on January 27, 2023, less than two weeks after the premiere of the first season. While the first season covers the events of Naughty Dog's video game The Last of Us (2013) and its downloadable expansion, The Last of Us: Left Behind (2014), the second season covers part of the sequel, The Last of Us Part II (2020). The showrunners, Craig Mazin and Neil Druckmann, wanted to avoid filler between the games. Part II is expected to span multiple seasons, and Mazin does not want the series to overtake the games. While writing the first season, Mazin and Druckmann ensured characters remained true to their developments in Part II in case the show received more seasons.

The series is a co-production of Sony Pictures Television, PlayStation Productions, Naughty Dog, the Mighty Mint, and Word Games, with Mazin, Druckmann, Carolyn Strauss, Evan Wells, Asad Qizilbash, and Carter Swan serving as returning executive producers. Jacqueline Lesko—who co–executive produced the first season and had worked with Mazin for over a decade, including as his assistant—was named an executive producer in March 2023, followed by Cecil O'Connor, a line producer on the first season, in February 2024. The season was produced by Allen Marshall Palmer and Julie Herrin. In January 2024, Druckmann, Mazin, and Peter Hoar were announced as returning directors alongside newcomers Kate Herron, Nina Lopez-Corrado, Mark Mylod, and Stephen Williams. Inspired by Noah Hawley's work on Fargo, Mazin felt directing the premiere allowed him to prepare the season, and he worked closely with each director on set. In June, Mazin and Druckmann revealed the season would consist of seven episodes. The series was renewed for a third season on April 9, 2025, before the second premiered.

=== Casting ===
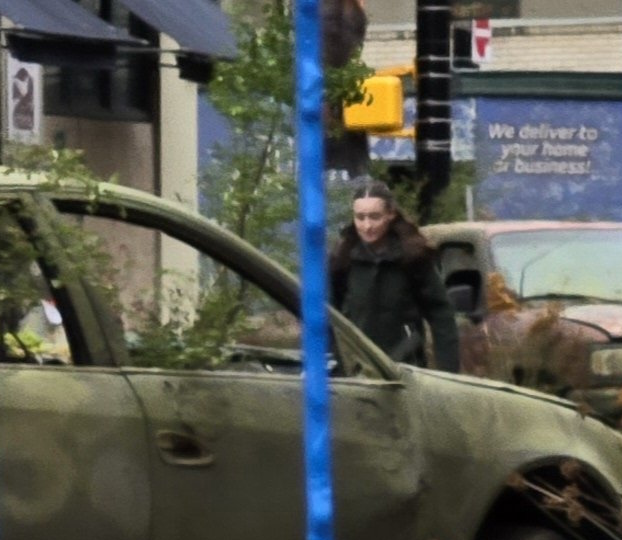
Bella Ramsey on set playing Ellie in Downtown Vancouver in August 2024

Druckmann felt Pedro Pascal and Bella Ramsey's comfort and familiarity with their characters—Joel and Ellie, respectively—allowed them to "dive deeper" into their performances. Pascal and Ramsey, who grew close during production of the first season, considered their separation "painful" and "lonelier" during filming for the second. HBO denied rumors that Pascal had finished filming in March 2024; he returned for later scenes. Ramsey added a "green rider" into their second-season contract, requiring all departments to adopt sustainable practices during production. The season introduces several new characters and spends more time with them. Mazin felt the new actors "fit right in" due to the series's established reputation. Casting was put on hold in May 2023 due to the Writers Guild of America strike; actors had been auditioning with scenes from The Last of Us Part II due to an absence of scripts.

The production team wanted to start the season's casting with Abby, beginning before the strike; Dever became the frontrunner after the strike ended in November, following the response to her performance in No One Will Save You (2023). She previously appeared in Naughty Dog's Uncharted 4: A Thief's End (2016), and was considered to play Ellie in the abandoned film adaptation of The Last of Us around the time. Her casting was announced on January 9, 2024, followed by Mazino's as Jesse on January 10, and Merced's as Dina on January 11. O'Hara's casting was announced on February 2, followed by Ramirez, Barer, Gabrielle, and Lord's on March 1, Wright's on May 24, and Ahlers, Burke, Lamanna, Pantoliano, Park, and Ubach's on March 5, 2025.

=== Writing ===
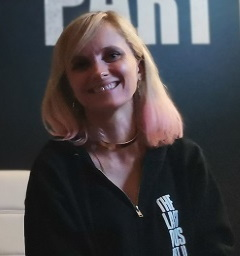
Halley Gross, who co-wrote The Last of Us Part II, joined the writers' room for the second season.

A writers' room for the second season was established in Los Angeles by February 2023, with Mazin and Druckmann joined by Halley Gross, who co-wrote Part II with Druckmann, and Bo Shim, a new writer. Gross was also named co–executive producer. Lesko was present as the writers outlined the season, becoming "their emotional temperature". Druckmann worked on the story during development of The Last of Us Part II Remastered (2024), allowing him to revisit and analyze its decisions and intricacies. The writers felt added pressure in working on the second season due to the success of the first. They began by splitting Part II's narrative into sections, then selecting some for the second season; the seven-episode length was chosen as a natural breaking point. They experimented with several methods of presenting the non-linear timeline, settling on what they found to be the "most impactful". Splitting across seasons prompted narrative rearrangement to present information earlier than in the game, such as Abby's backstory and relationships. Some changes were also made as the game's shifting player perspective between Ellie and Abby no longer applied. Content cut from the game, including some presented in Part II Remastered, was added to the series.

Druckmann considered himself biased when adapting the "intimately familiar" story and tried to keep an open mind with changes; he and Mazin generally agreed. Scripts were being written by April 2023, with a full outline mapped, but writing was affected by the writers' strike in May; Mazin submitted the first episode about 90 minutes before the strike began, and neither he nor Druckmann worked on the series while the strike was ongoing. Instead, Mazin mentally outlined scenes while taking walks, described as "brain-writing", as he planned to quickly complete scripts after the strike to ensure a smooth production schedule. Mazin wrote the first five episodes and co-wrote the final two with Druckmann and Gross. The second season features themes of revenge, in contrast to the first season's unconditional love; Druckmann felt it was a "continuation of love from the first season, and this is just the dark side of that coin". To Mazin, writing a series "about people that love each other and care for each other" is unlikely to work unless the cast and crew feel similarly in real life. The second season, like the first, highlights several duos, such as Ellie and Dina.

The second season is set five years after the first-season finale, following the effect of Joel's lie on Ellie, which Mazin called the season's "beating heart". It explores themes of tribalism and the effect of losing loved ones from within one's group, and the troubling view of heroism when viewed from alternative perspectives. It also highlights themes of change, growth, and escalation, reflected internally within characters like Ellie and communities like Jackson, Wyoming, as well as in the outside world, demonstrated by the enhanced types of infected. Viewers' requests for additional infected scenes after the first season aligned with Druckmann and Mazin's own feelings, resulting in more focus on the infected in the second season. The writers' familiarity with the show's production allowed for more action sequences, through which they maintained connections to character development. Mazin felt the first season's limited action sequences were a result of its focus on Joel and Ellie, whereas the second season's additional characters granted a broader focus. He wanted action scenes to demonstrate the desperation and loss that the characters often forget, partly inspired by the Game of Thrones episode "Hardhome" (2015). Spores—the vector through which infection is spread in the games—return as a secondary vector in the second season, having been replaced by tendrils forming a unified network.

=== Filming ===
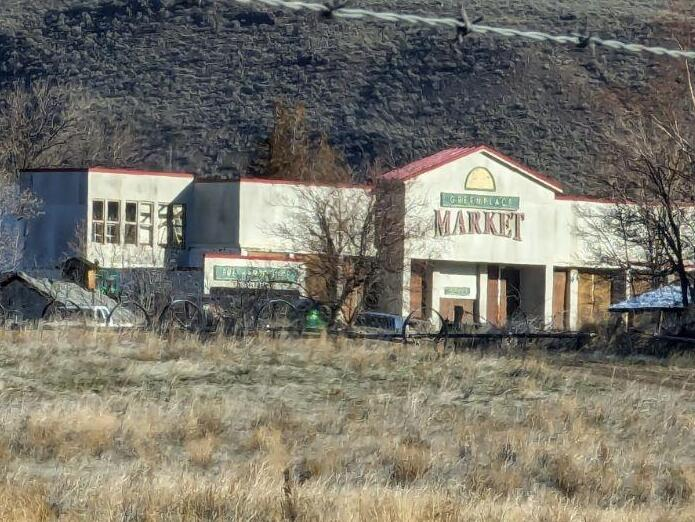
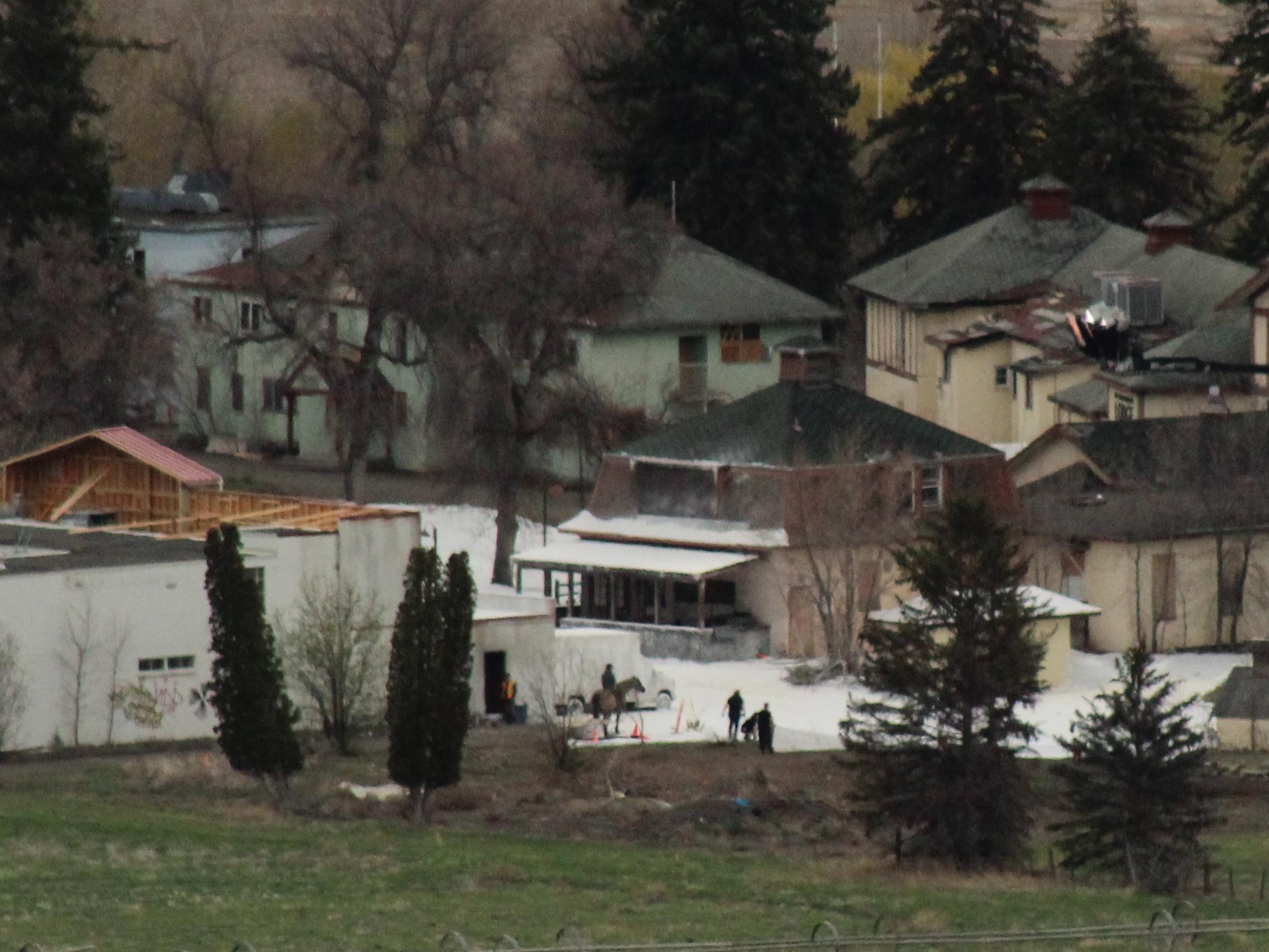
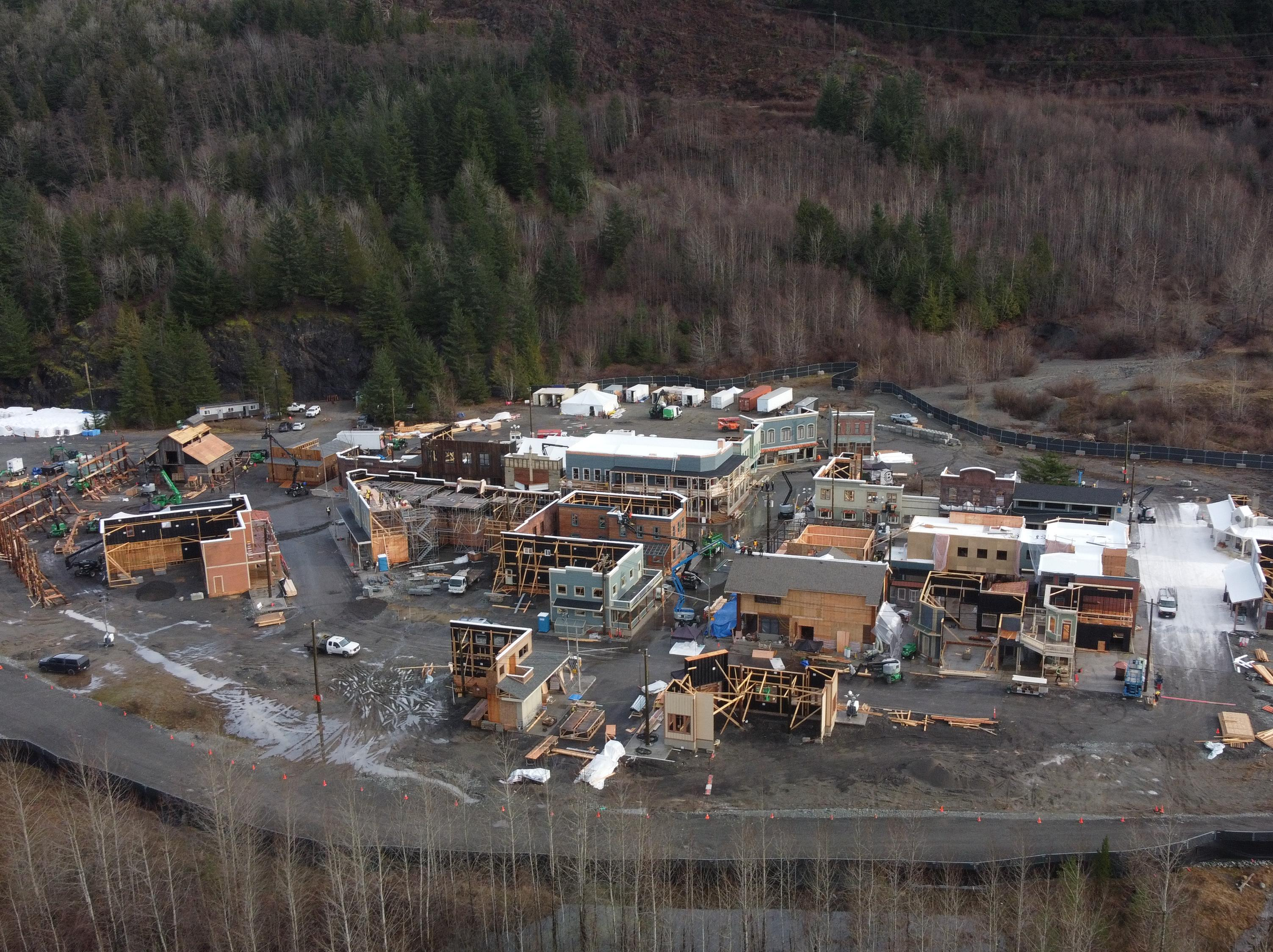
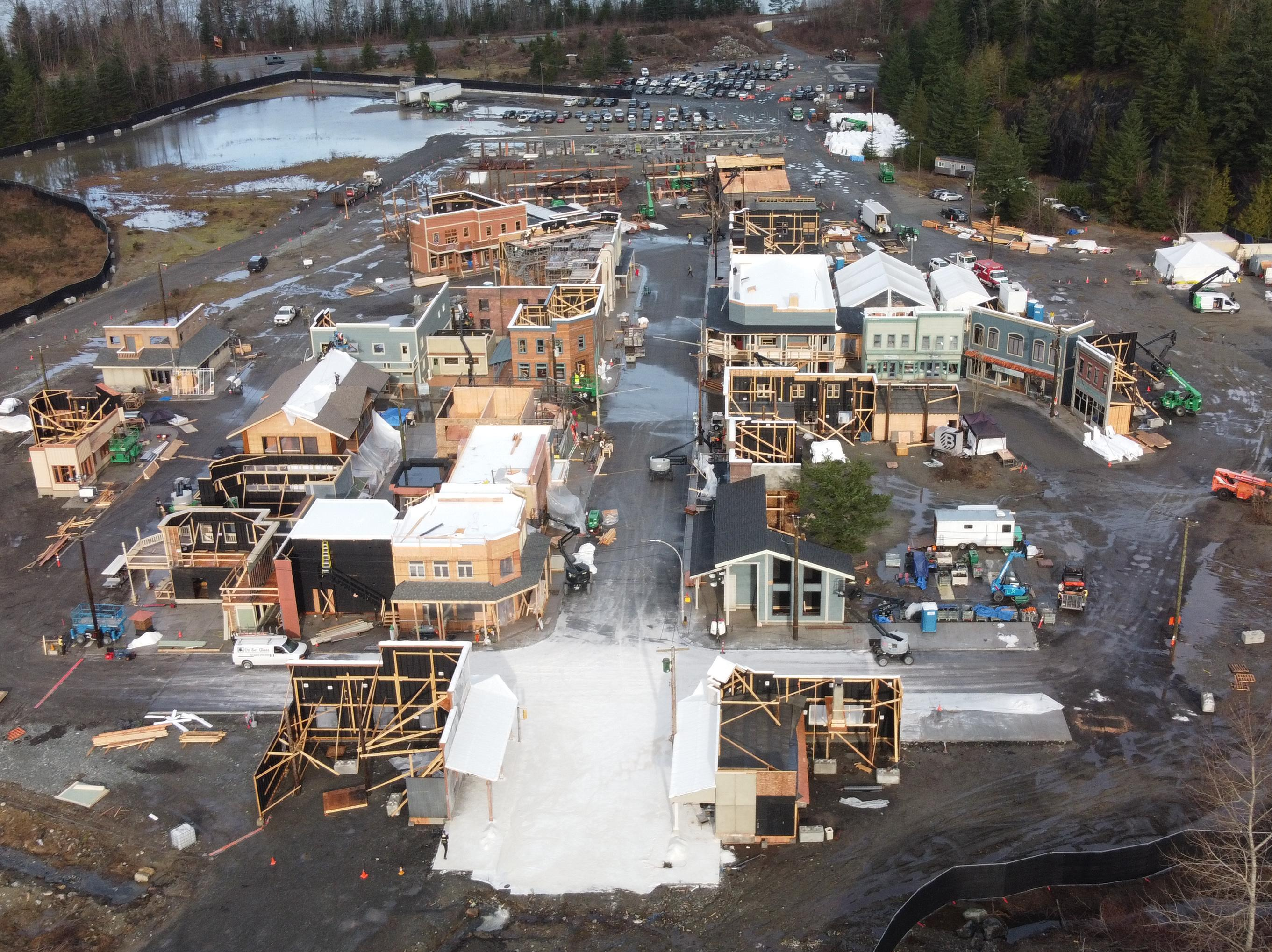
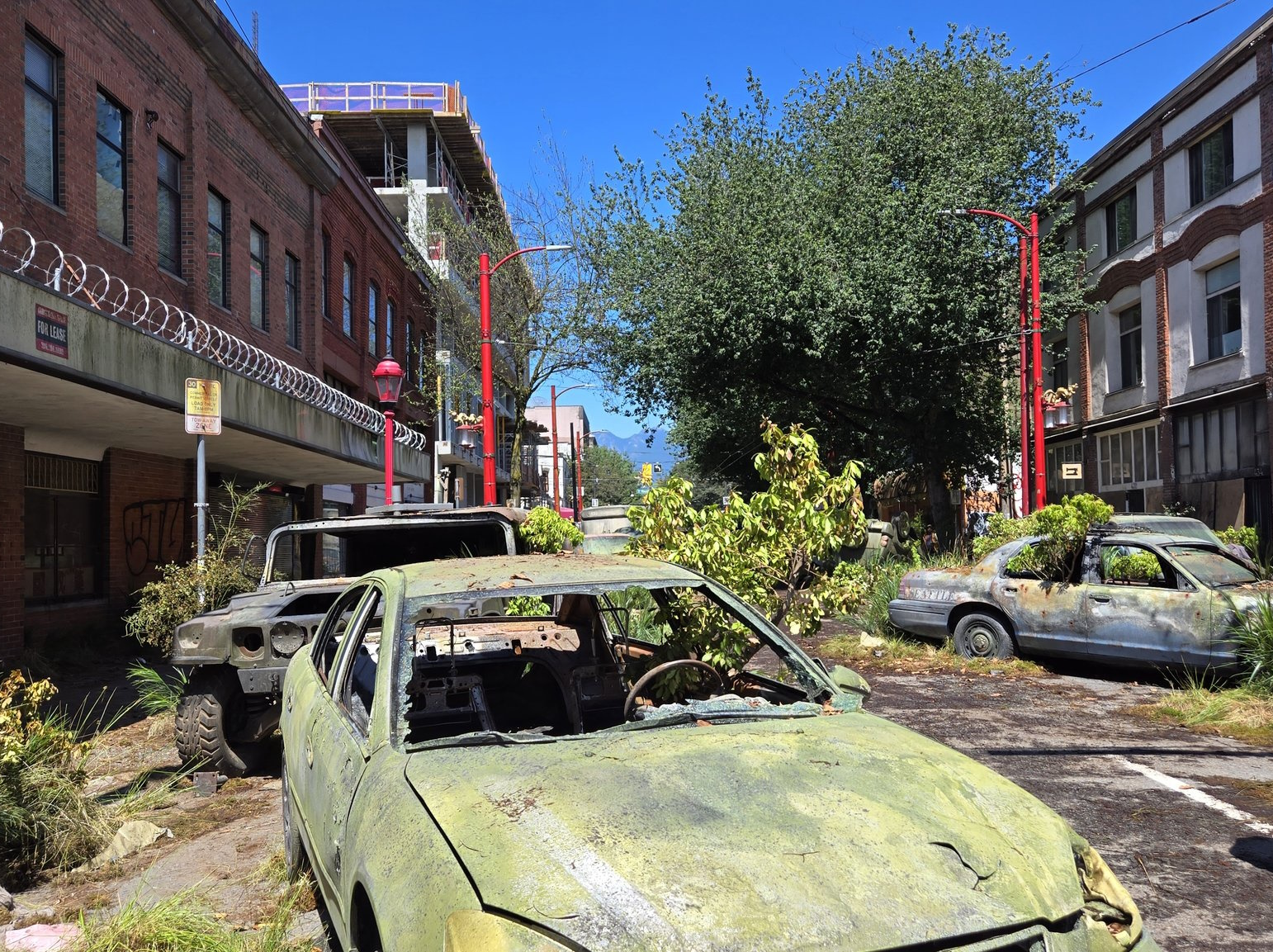
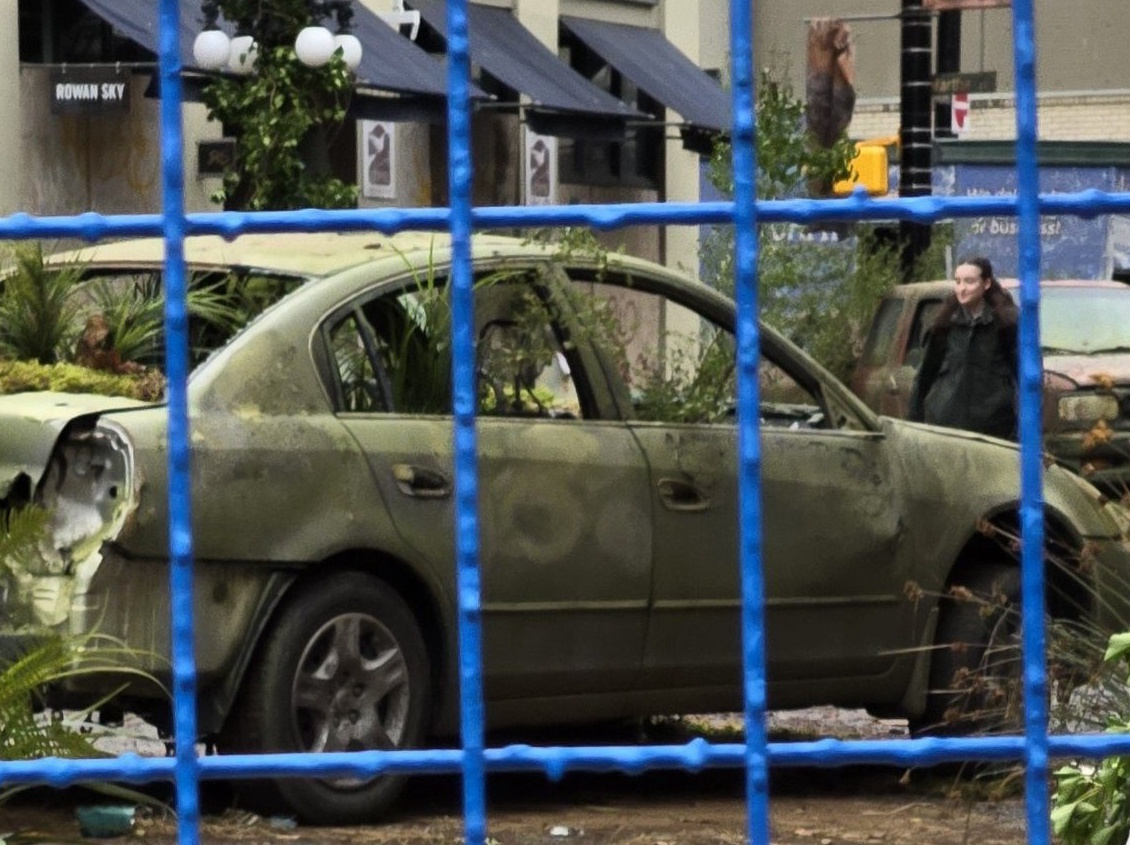
Filming took place in Kamloops (top) in February 2024, Britannia Beach (center) in June and July, and Downtown Vancouver (bottom) in July and August.

Filming lasted over 150 days in 60–70 locations (typically 8–10 locations per episode), primarily in British Columbia. At its peak, the production involved around 1,200–1,800 people across multiple units on eight or nine soundstages and three backlots. Vancouver replicates Seattle, assisted by sets created by the art teams; it was lit with cool, green tones to reflect its humidity, though the series maintained its warm tones overall, such as Jackson's "brown, Western texture". The season was primarily filmed with Arri Alexa 35 cameras with modified Cooke Optics S4x lenses; exchanging the iris with Luxo's 35 mm lens added more glow and allowing better visibility in darker scenes.

Ksenia Sereda returned as the lead director of photography, setting the tone in the premiere with Mazin and working with Hoar, Williams, and Druckmann, while Catherine Goldschmidt worked with Mylod, Herron, and Lopez-Corrado. Both had freedom as the episodes were largely standalone; they alternated, with one filming while the other prepared. Sereda was inspired by the game and its cinematography, focusing on handheld shots to remain close to the characters and maintain flexibility for action scenes. She established the tones with senior colorist Steven Nakamura, and developed the lenses with Arri, each engraved with a pink Firefly logo.

Delayed by the writers' and actors' strikes, principal photography began on February 12, 2024, under the working title Mega Sword. Mazin directed from February, followed by Mylod in March, Herron and Hoar in April, Williams and Druckmann in May, and Lopez-Corrado in July. Filming took place in Kamloops in February, and in Calgary, Alberta, in March, before moving to Mission, Fort Langley, and Langley, replicating parts of Jackson. Production returned to Alberta for 16 days from March 18, with filming in Exshaw, Fortress Mountain, and along Highway 1A requiring a 72-hour partial highway closure. Intermittent filming occurred in Maple Ridge from April to July.

Filming occurred in Vancouver's Downtown Eastside in early May, followed by Nanaimo in mid-May, on a private Britannia Beach property in June and early July, and in Chinatown, Vancouver in July. Druckmann completed production by July 9. Filming returned to Downtown Eastside in mid-July, and moved to Stanley Park, Downtown Vancouver, and Coal Harbour's Harbour Green Park. Production occurred in New Westminster and at the Orpheum theatre in late July, and around Cordova and Cambie Streets in Gastown in August. The wrap party took place on August 18, and principal photography was set to conclude on August 21, several weeks before September 9 as originally scheduled; it finished on August 23, and the production office closed on September 27. At least three rounds of additional photography took place over the next six months, including in Downtown Vancouver—the exterior of the Guinness Tower and Oceanic Plaza—in September, and Vancouver Aquarium in January 2025.

=== Music ===
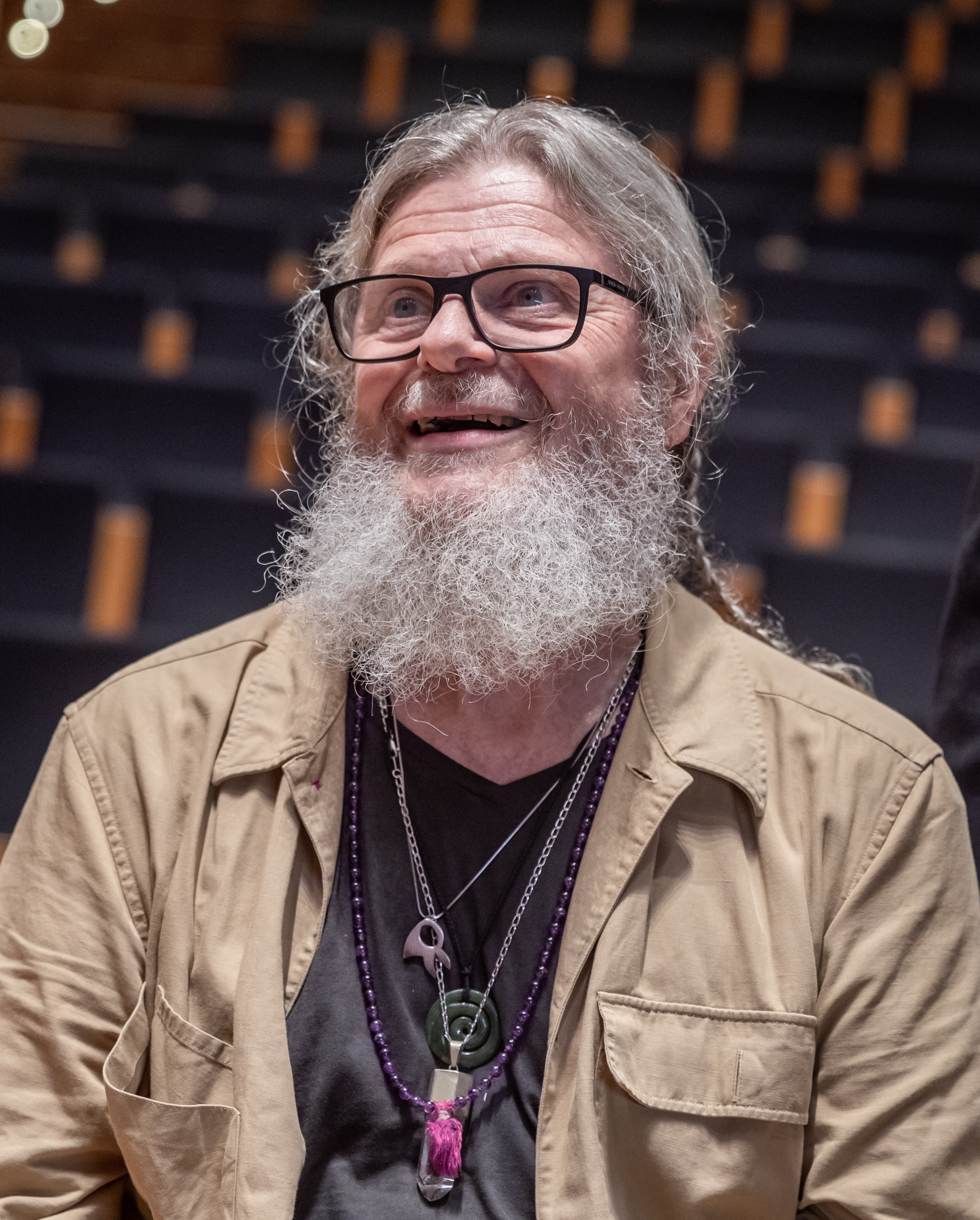
Gustavo Santaolalla returned to compose the score for the series alongside David Fleming.

Gustavo Santaolalla and David Fleming returned to compose the score for the season. Santaolalla, who composed the music for the games, considered each theme interchangeable, moving the games' music to different scenes in the series matching the same emotion. He worked on the character-driven score and Fleming on action-driven, and they collaborated on blending the two. Fleming felt diverting from Santaolalla's original game score was often necessary to give the series its own identity, but otherwise sought to maintain the same feeling and avoid unnecessary diversion. He felt their different approaches complemented their individual tasks for the series. Mazin worked with the composers to determine specific sounds for each character and group, such as Ellie, Abby's friends, and the infected. They scored Abby to match her anger, pain, and trauma akin to Ellie's, rather than as a traditional antagonist. A 41-track soundtrack album was released digitally on May 23, 2025.

Druckmann considered music conducive to the narrative, akin to the game, with characters performing or listening to music contributing to worldbuilding or relationships. The first episode is named after Pearl Jam's song "Future Days", which features in the game and is played by Joel in the sixth episode; the song did not exist in 2003, when the outbreak takes place in the series, but Mazin and Druckmann felt its inclusion was important and thematically appropriate to Joel and Ellie's character arcs. The first episode features cameo appearances by Santaolalla and Crooked Still, playing the latter's music which featured in the game. The second episode is named after Shawn James's "Through the Valley" and ends with a cover performed by Ashley Johnson, who portrayed Ellie in the games and Ellie's mother Anna in the series. The fourth episode sees Ellie serenade Dina on guitar playing A-ha's "Take On Me" to match the game.

=== Design ===
Costume designer Ann Foley replaced Cynthia Ann Summers for the second season. She was a fan of the first season before joining the second, and watched a playthrough of the game while preparing to pitch concepts. Like Summers, she found the grounded nature more difficult than other projects. She printed imagery from the games to form her mood boards, and worked directly with the actors, who provided their own input and feedback. She incorporated several real clothing pieces for characters, purchased from vintage dealers in Los Angeles and Vancouver; around 95% of the clothes for Jackson's characters were from thrift stores. The time jump allowed Foley to add her own elements atop Summers's work. Joel's costumes were largely maintained to show his simplistic attitude, with subtle changes like slightly darker tones to convey his emotion and tucked shirts to reflect his fatherly role, like Tommy, and Ellie's demonstrated her growth with a cooler color palette, imitating Joel's blues and greens. At Foley's request, Ramsey drew on Ellie's Converse shoes to show the character's age and personality. Foley ensured Ellie's tattoo—by makeup department head Rebecca Lee—was visible, and tested her green jacket outdoors with Sereda to ensure its color was "beautiful".

Foley was inspired by a 1980s Marlboro advertisement for Tommy and the "late 90s vibe" of an Aviator Nation jacket to fit Dina's effervescent personality. The WLF costumes were former FEDRA outfits, with a brown and gray color palette to reflect their lack of resources; Foley used the same colors for Abby as a subtle hint. She and concept artist Imogene Chayes worked with Naughty Dog character art director Ashley Swidowski on the Seraphites; their costumes reflect their handmade quality, with brown and green colors matching the forests; Most costumes were designed with protective elements in preparation for snow and rain and aged to add a vintage appearance, reflecting the late 1990s and early 2000s. Mazin and Druckmann wanted to integrate the costumes with the infected, for which Foley collaborated closely with the prosthetics teams. Some infected, such as clickers, required iterations lasting up to ten days; Foley wanted each creature to have unique costumes and colors to tell individual stories.

Prosthetics designer Barrie Gower returned for the second season. Mazin considered Joel's death prosthetics the season's most important; Pascal was 3D scanned to allow Gower to craft with his measurements in mind, especially as Pascal's left eye would be closed. The Seraphites' scar prosthetics were made of a paste-based appliance and thickened with a food mixer; they took around 30–45 minutes to apply to the actors. Gower wanted to ensure they did not inhibit the performances or "take up too much space". For the infected, he changed some of their appearances to reflect the colder weather, making them look frostbitten. The prosthetics team worked on about 20 to 30 performers each day for close-up shots of the infected. Lesko and O'Connor led the teams responsible for the second episode's action scenes, which included dozens of stunt performers and around 100 extras in prosthetics; the stunt performers attended a boot camp to familiarize themselves with the roles. Don Macaulay, an art director on the first season, replaced John Paino as the production designer for the second.

=== Post-production ===
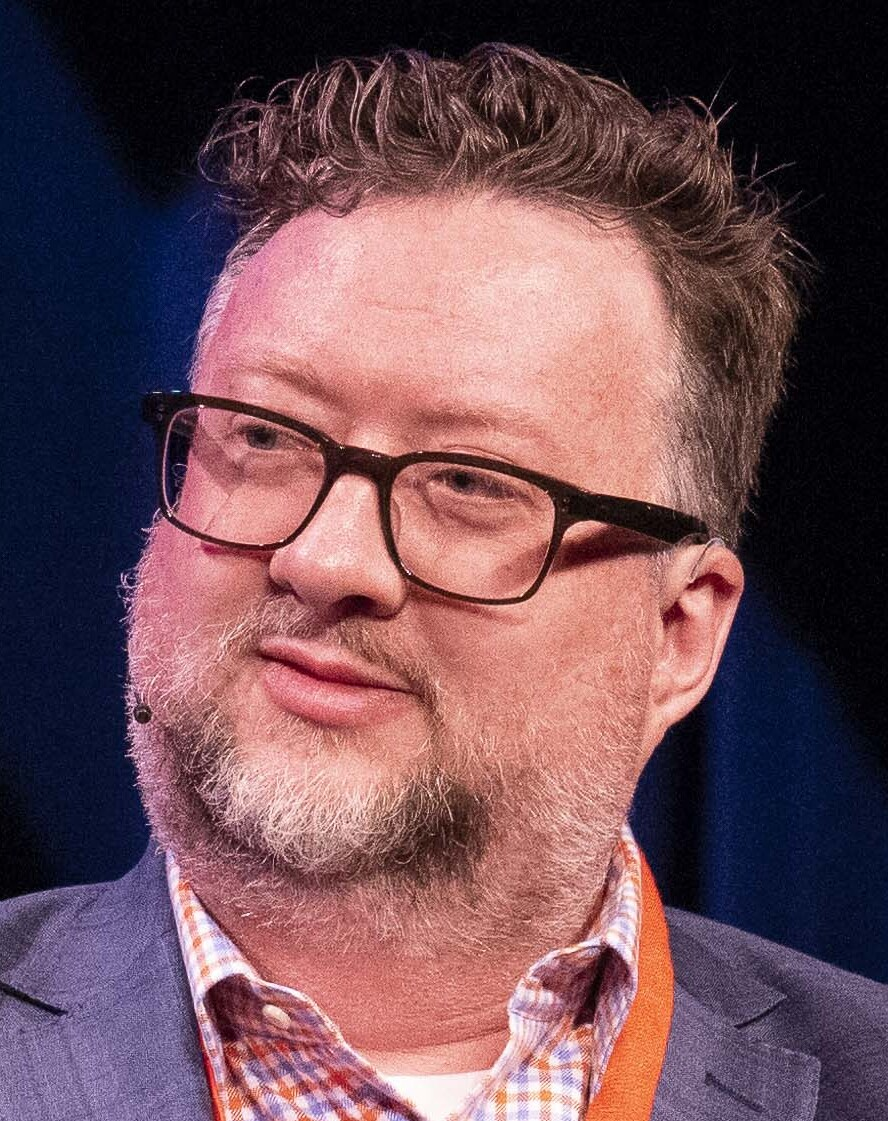
Timothy A. Good returned as lead editor and co-producer for the second season.

Timothy A. Good returned as lead editor for the second season alongside Emily Mendez as editor, joined by Simon Smith, who edited the third and fifth episodes. Mazin previously worked with Smith on Chernobyl (2019). Good was named a co-producer, working on the sound mix early in post-production at Mazin's request. The editors watched the material as it arrived, which Good found overwhelming but necessary to find the best takes. Mendez was a fan of the games while Good had not played them; Mendez worked with Mazin to approach scenes from the perspective of fans, while Good approached from a general viewpoint. Good ensured scenes focused on Abby making decisions to allow audiences to understand her perspective despite her antagonistic actions.

Eleven visual effects teams worked on the season for about a year, including Clear Angle Studios, Crafty Apes, DNEG, Important Looking Pirates, Rise FX, Storm Studios, and Wētā FX. Some teams started previsualization work by December 2023. The second episode used over 600 visual effects shots, almost 200 more than the previous season's fifth episode. Wētā worked on the infected, subway, and stalkers sequences in the second, fourth and fifth episodes, respectively, contributing 384 visual effects shots. DNEG reconstructed and aged Seattle for the season, creating 356 visual effects shots featuring more than 20 environments across 36 sequences. Much of its work was based on the game's concepts and designs.

The team spent five days in Seattle to gather references and inspiration, working with Clear Angle to capture lidar footage and the Seattle-based Motion State for drone footage, including of the aquarium, Great Wheel, and Space Needle, to help the city feel believable and organic. Some first-season vegetation assets were reused alongside several additions to match the Pacific Northwest, with the lush nature reflecting the city's climate over time; the team used Houdini to add digital greenery with simultaneous wind simulations. Footage of real floods in the Pacific Northwest was used as reference when designing the city's coastal collapse; the team wanted the environment to tell its own story, with the history of destruction informed by the direction of the debris and its surroundings. The Pinnacle Theater, filmed on a backlot in Surrey, British Columbia, was based on Seattle's Paramount Theatre; Naughty Dog provided the in-game assets for reference.

== Release ==
=== Broadcast and home media ===
In December 2023, HBO announced that the second season was set to premiere on its television network and streaming service Max in 2025. Casey Bloys, the chairman and chief executive officer of HBO and Max, said it would air during the eligibility window for the following Emmy Awards. Druckmann announced the season's April premiere window as part of Sony's Consumer Electronics Show (CES) presentation on January 6, 2025; the following month, HBO announced the premiere date of April 13. American Sign Language (ASL) versions of each episodes, performed by Daniel Durant and directed by Leila Hanaumi, were released on Max simultaneously.

The first episode received its red carpet world premiere at the TCL Chinese Theatre in Los Angeles on March 24—which The Hollywood Reporter's Kirsten Chuba called one of the year's best—followed by a red carpet and theater screening at the State Theatre in Sydney on April 2, Grand Rex in Paris on April 5, and Vue West End in Leicester Square, London, on April 10. An influencer pre-screening took place at the Domino Sugar Refinery in Brooklyn. Max partnered with Complex to host an advanced screening of the third episode at NYA Studios in Los Angeles on April 24. Behind-the-scenes videos, titled Making of The Last of Us, were released on Max and YouTube following each episode; executive producer Badger Denehy compared the videos to a movie theater parking lot, wherein audiences gather with friends to "dive into all the biggest moments".

The season was released for digital purchase in May alongside the ASL versions, including as a bundle with the first season, and was released by Warner Bros. Discovery Home Entertainment on DVD, Blu-ray, and Ultra HD Blu-ray (including a SteelBook version) in the United Kingdom on September 15, 2025, and in the United States on September 23. The release contains behind-the-scenes featurettes including set tours, a Q&A with Pascal and Ramsey, and the Making of The Last of Us series. On the Official Charts Company's Video Chart in the United Kingdom, the home media release ranked 61st in 2025.

=== Promotion ===
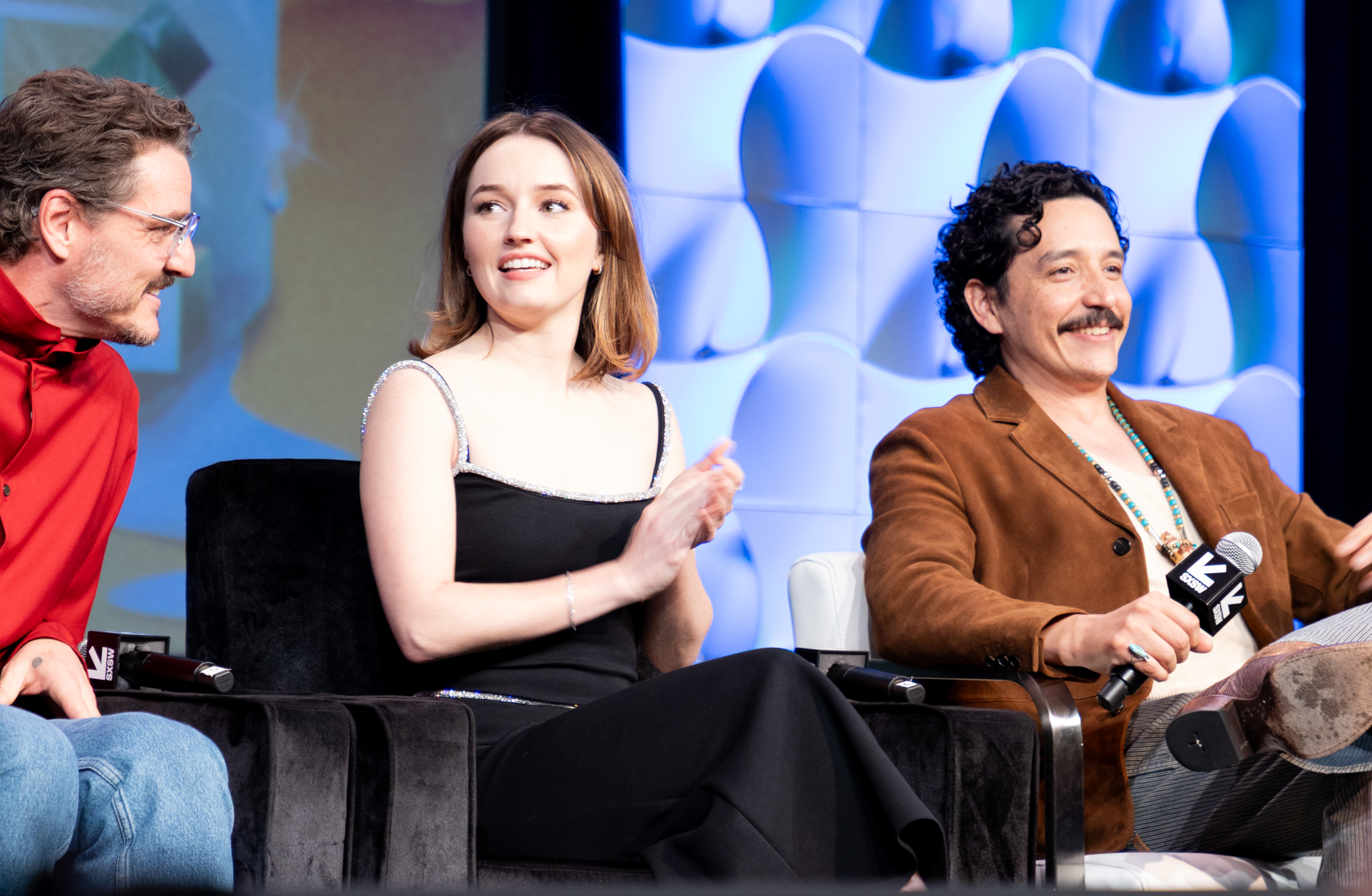
Pedro Pascal, Kaitlyn Dever, and Gabriel Luna promoting The Last of Us at SXSW

The marketing team selected precise footage for each trailer to avoid spoilers, especially regarding Abby's appearance, avoiding Part II's approach of altering characters within scenes; the trailers largely follow Ellie's perspective. HBO shared the first images of Pascal and Ramsey on May 15, 2024, and the first footage—featuring Dever, Merced, O'Hara, and Wright—on August 4, alongside House of the Dragon's second-season finale. For The Last of Us Day on September 26, HBO released the season's synopsis, posters by Greg Ruth of Joel, Ellie, and Abby, and the first teaser trailer, set to Pearl Jam's "Future Days". New footage was released on November 12, alongside The Penguin's finale, and a preview was shown at a Max showcase in London on December 5. Merced presented Best Adaptation at the Game Awards 2024 on December 12 alongside Shannon Woodward, who portrayed Dina in the game.

A teaser trailer was aired during Sony's CES presentation on January 6, 2025, and character posters featuring Abby, Ellie, and Joel were released on February 19. Dever, Druckmann, Luna, Mazin, Mazino, Merced, Pascal, and Ramsey appeared on a panel at SXSW on March 8, where the full trailer was officially released, having leaked hours earlier. It received the most three-day views of any HBO and Max original trailer with 158 million views, a 160% increase from the series's previous marketing. The season's key art was released on March 13, followed by a poster of Joel and Ellie on March 20, and nine character posters on March 24. The show's companion podcast returned alongside each episode, hosted by Troy Baker (who portrayed Joel in the games and James in the first season) alongside Druckmann and Mazin, joined by Gross for the last two episodes.

Sony Pictures Consumer Products selected brand partners that fit the narrative's themes and content; partnerships were announced in March and unveiled over the following month: a cordyceps-infused coffee by Four Sigmatic, cordyceps-infused chocolate by Alice Mushrooms (co-owned by Pascal), denim outfits by Wrangler, boots by Timberland, and an acoustic guitar by Taylor Guitars. HBO partnered with Athletic Club to display the series's logo on the club's playing kit on April 13 and on the San Mamés Stadium from April 9–15. For its 100th anniversary La Playa Awaits campaign, Corona partnered with Warner Bros. Discovery Ad Sales to cater the Los Angeles premiere, sponsor the influencer screening, and provide title sponsorship in April and May, including the ASL versions, bumpers, and a Max takeover on April 27; Luna also starred in two Corona advertisements. The Last of Us Complete—a game bundle containing The Last of Us Part I and Part II Remastered for the PlayStation 5—was released digitally on April 10 before the season premiere.

The worldwide press tour ran from the red carpet premiere on March 24 until the first episode aired on April 13. Pascal appeared on Jimmy Kimmel Live! alongside a clip from the series on March 24, and Ramsey was featured on the covers of British Vogue and The Hollywood Reporter and on Entertainment Weekly's digital "cover" with Dever and Pascal in April. Dever, Luna, Mazino, Merced, Ramsey, and Wright attended a press event at Sydney Harbour to celebrate Max's Australian launch on March 31, alongside the April 2 premiere, and Druckmann, Mazin, and Ramsey attended a Deadline Contenders Television panel at the DGA Theater in Los Angeles on April 5. Ramsey appeared on The Tonight Show Starring Jimmy Fallon on April 7, showing a clip from the series and rapping a recap of the first season, and on The Jonathan Ross Show on April 12, and Luna and Merced presented Audio Achievement at the 21st British Academy Games Awards on April 8.

In the week before the premiere, additional videos and images were released and pages on Max received fungus-inspired designs that slowly grew over several days. Merced was L'Officiel USA's May cover model. Mazino and Merced appeared on The Tonight Show Starring Jimmy Fallon on May 15 and 20, the latter in her late-night talk show debut, and both appeared on The Kelly Clarkson Show on May 20, alongside a clip from the finale, while Dever was on Jimmy Kimmel Live! on May 29. Druckmann, Mazin, and Merced attended a For Your Consideration (FYC) event hosted by Sony Pictures Television at its studios on May 29, and Druckmann and Mazin attended Variety's A Night in the Writers' Room drama panel on June 5. In Los Angeles, several crew members—Fleming, Good, Macaulay, Mazin, Sereda, and Wang—attended an IGN Live panel on June 8 and, with Druckmann, an Emmys FYC event on June 9; a second panel, moderated by Rob McElhenney, featured Dever, Druckmann, Luna, Mazin, Mazino, Merced, and Ramsey. Barer appeared on Jimmy Kimmel Live! on June 26. The Television Academy's Televerse festival at L.A. Live featured a panel with Dever, Druckmann, Good, Macaulay, Mazin, Pantoliano, and Wang on August 16, and Dever, Druckmann, Good, Mazin, Pantoliano, Pascal, and Ramsey attended a Deadline Contenders HBO Max panel at Nya Studios West in Hollywood on August 17.

== Reception ==
=== Critical response ===
The Last of Us season 2: Critical reception by episode
Percentage of positive critics' reviews tracked by the website Rotten Tomatoes

The second season of The Last of Us received "universal acclaim" according to review aggregator Metacritic, with a weighted score of 81 out of 100 based on 44 reviews. On Rotten Tomatoes, 92% of 272 critics gave a positive review. The website's general consensus called it "a challenging expansion that retains its predecessor's superb performances and verisimilitude". Critics felt the season reinforced The Last of Us as the best video game adaptation; /Film's Jeremy Mathai felt it "sets a new standard". Empire's John Nugent called it "another remarkable run of episodes" and "post-apocalyptic television at its peak", and Collider's Ross Bonaime declared it "one of 2025's best seasons of TV". Reviewers praised the action sequences, direction, performances, production design, and writing, though some criticized the pacing and considered the story incomplete.

/Film's Matahi lauded the unified creative vision of each production department, and Collider's Bonaime praised the matching of each director with their familiar subject matter. Several reviewers compared the second episode's action sequences to Game of Thrones at its best; Empire's Nugent called it "exceptional grand scale cinematic television few others than HBO can muster", and The Times's James Jackson compared it to the opening sequence of Saving Private Ryan (1998), though IGN's Simon Cardy found it an overcorrection of the first season's scarce action and felt it overshadowed other pivotal moments. Many critics considered the sixth episode the standout for highlighting Joel and Ellie's relationship, though some felt it highlighted their noted absence elsewhere in the season and IGN's Cardy thought it impeded momentum. Some reviewers considered the premiere episode effective but the finale the weakest. Praise was directed at the cinematography for highlighting performances and matching the game's cinematic qualities, and the production design for its presenting the world's beauty and destruction, though TheWrap's Chase Hutchinson found Seattle's recreation occasionally lacking.

Several reviewers praised the season's deeper themes and more complex characters, particularly in its focus on Ellie's relationships. Radio Times's Louise Griffin lauded the "unrivalled storytelling" and mapping of details, perspectives, and flashbacks to develop the world, and /Film's Mathai found several scenes gained additional meanings on repeated viewings. Many praised the adaptation of scenes to fit the medium and some felt the original writing was strongest, though Total Film's Lauren Milici thought its unsatisfying alterations failed to "capture the same emotional weight as the source material" and IGN's Cardy questioned whether Ellie and Abby's playability made the game more enjoyable. Some reviewers felt the lack of scenes with Joel and Ellie left the second season weaker than the first, and others found the quicker pace detrimental and the narrative unsatisfyingly incomplete, particularly demonstrated in Seattle's warring factions. The Hollywood Reporter's Angie Han wrote the season lacked the first's "rich lyricism ... sprawling humanity [and] devastating finality", and The New York Times's Mike Hale felt attempts to amplify both drama and action left the series "feeling neither here nor there". Some considered new characters like Abby, Isaac, and Hanrahan underdeveloped and thought the non-chronological storytelling detracted from pacing and worldbuilding. Others found the political allegories overly simplistic or offensive.

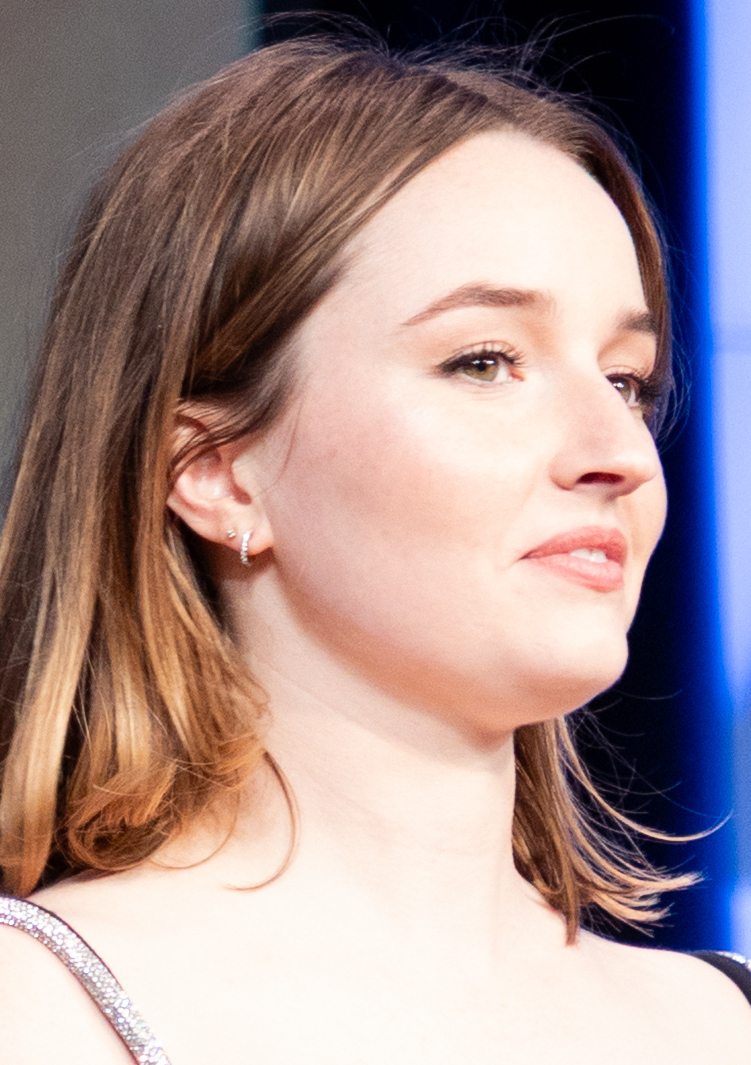
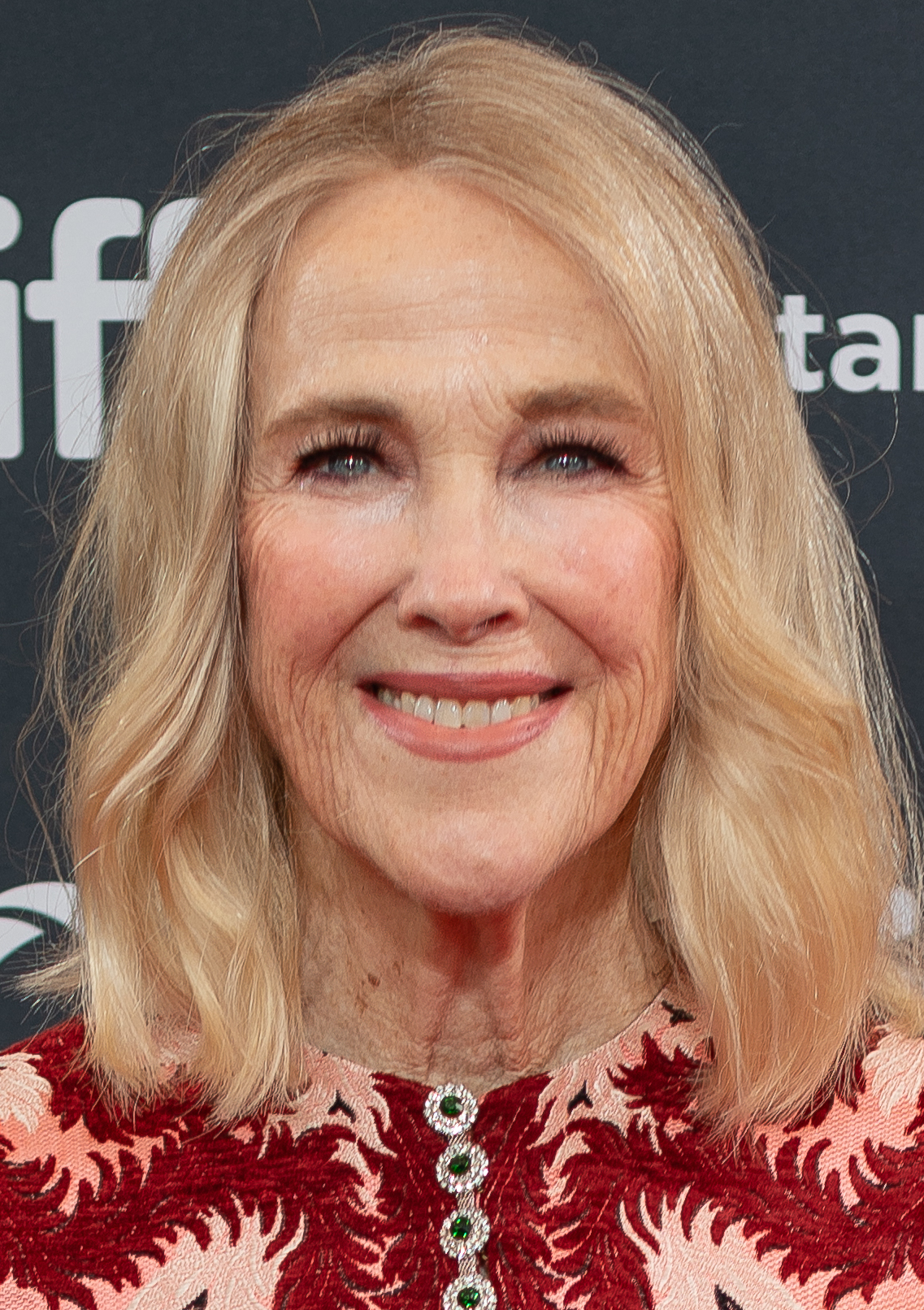
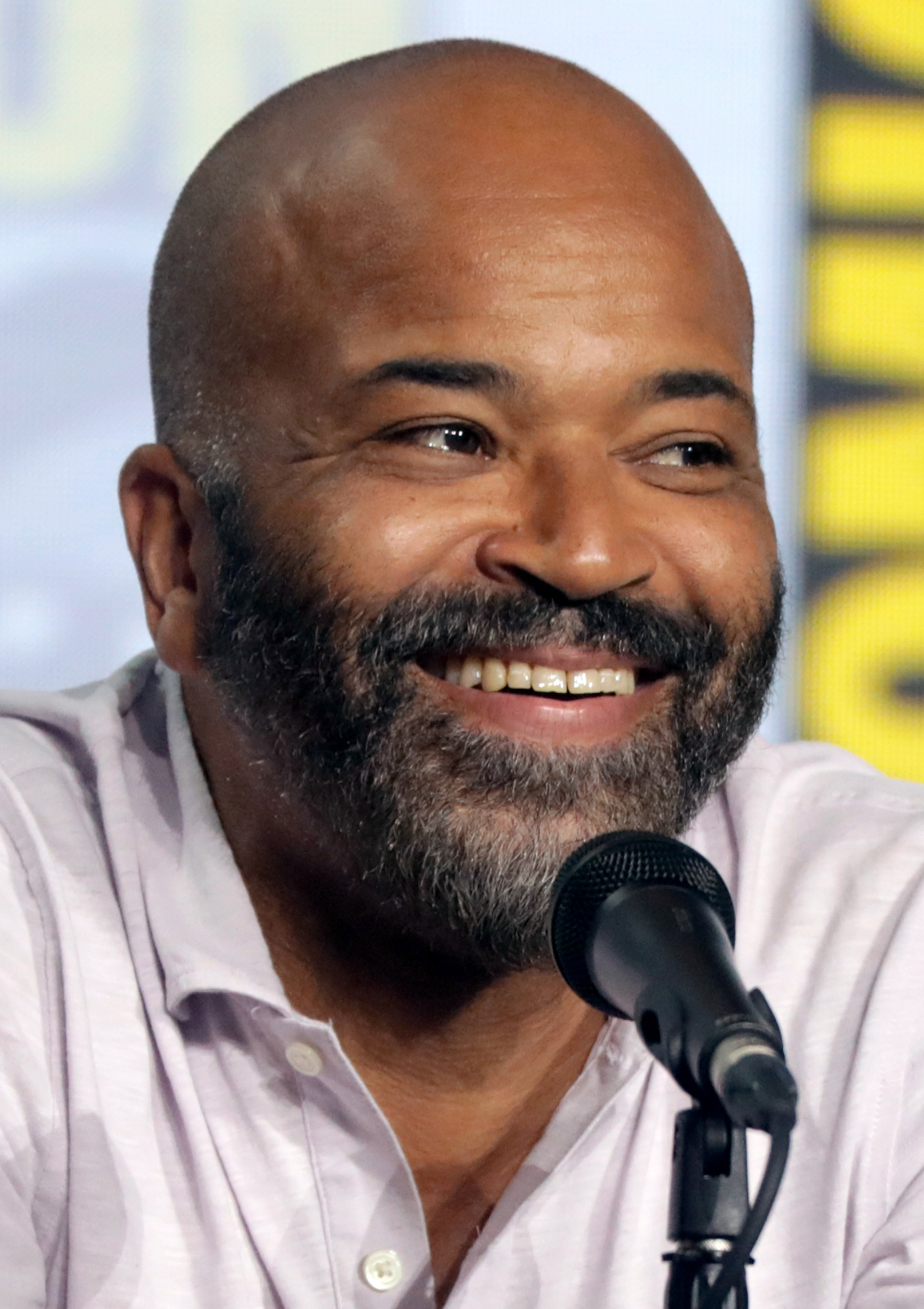
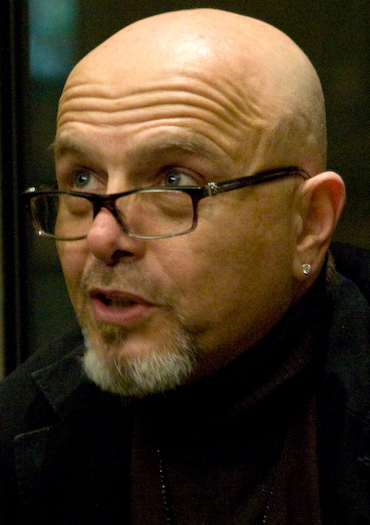
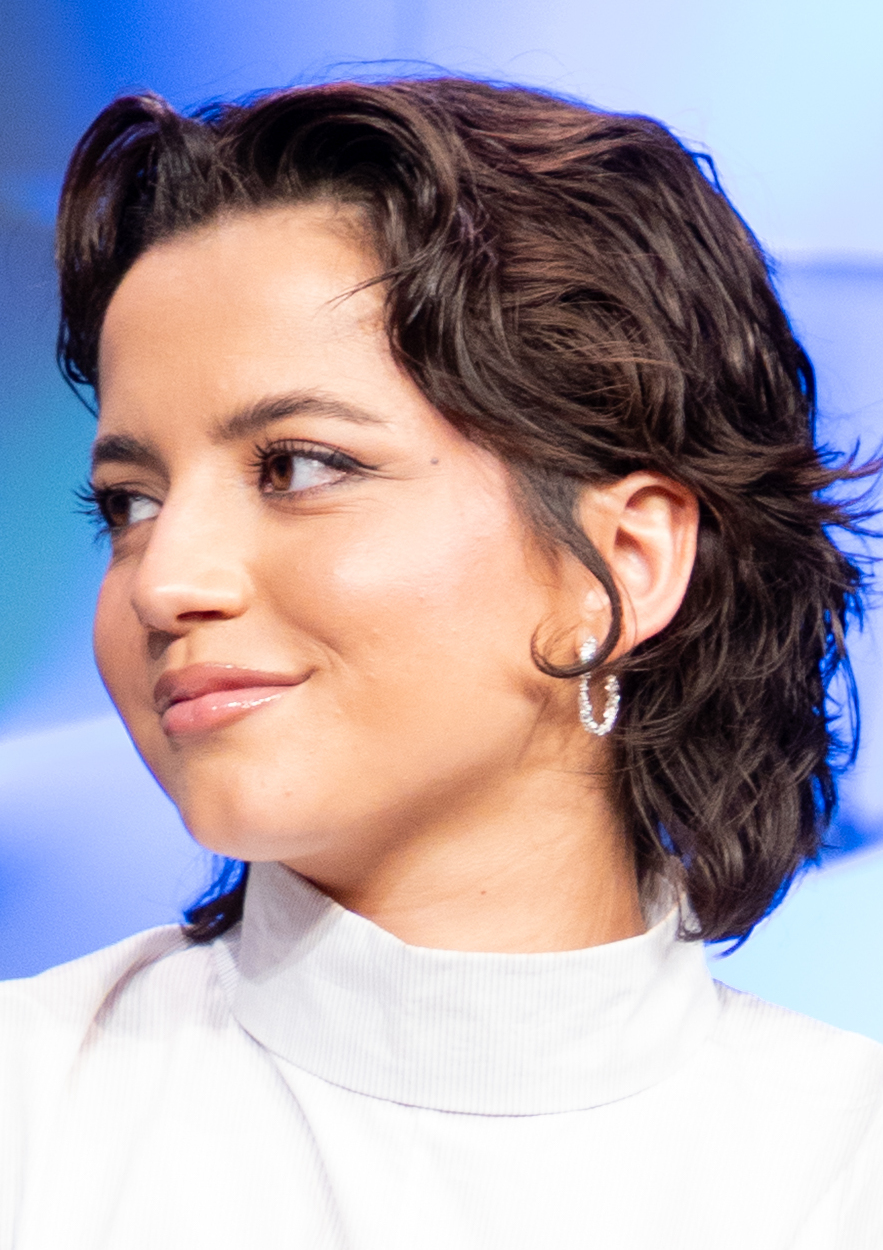
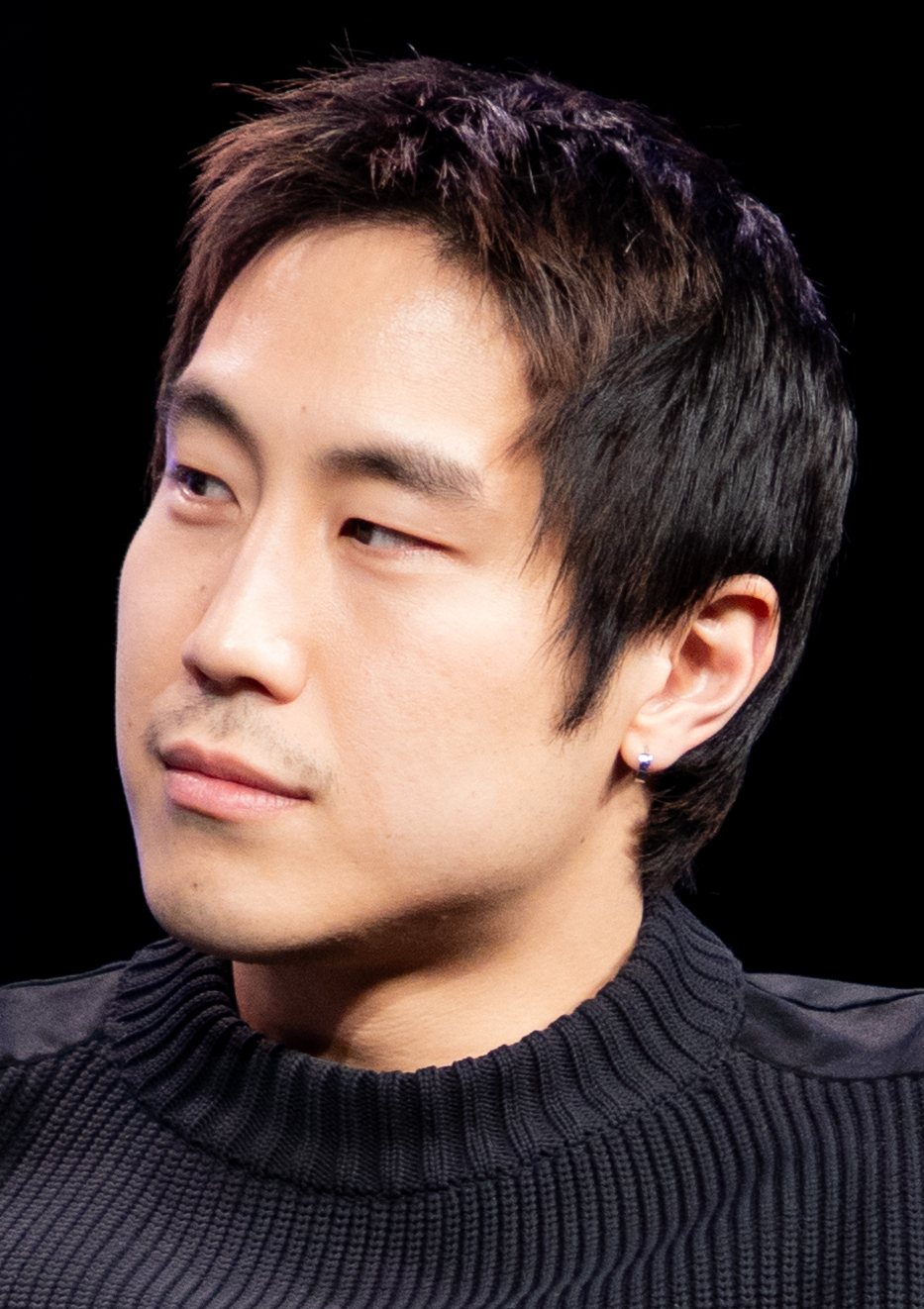
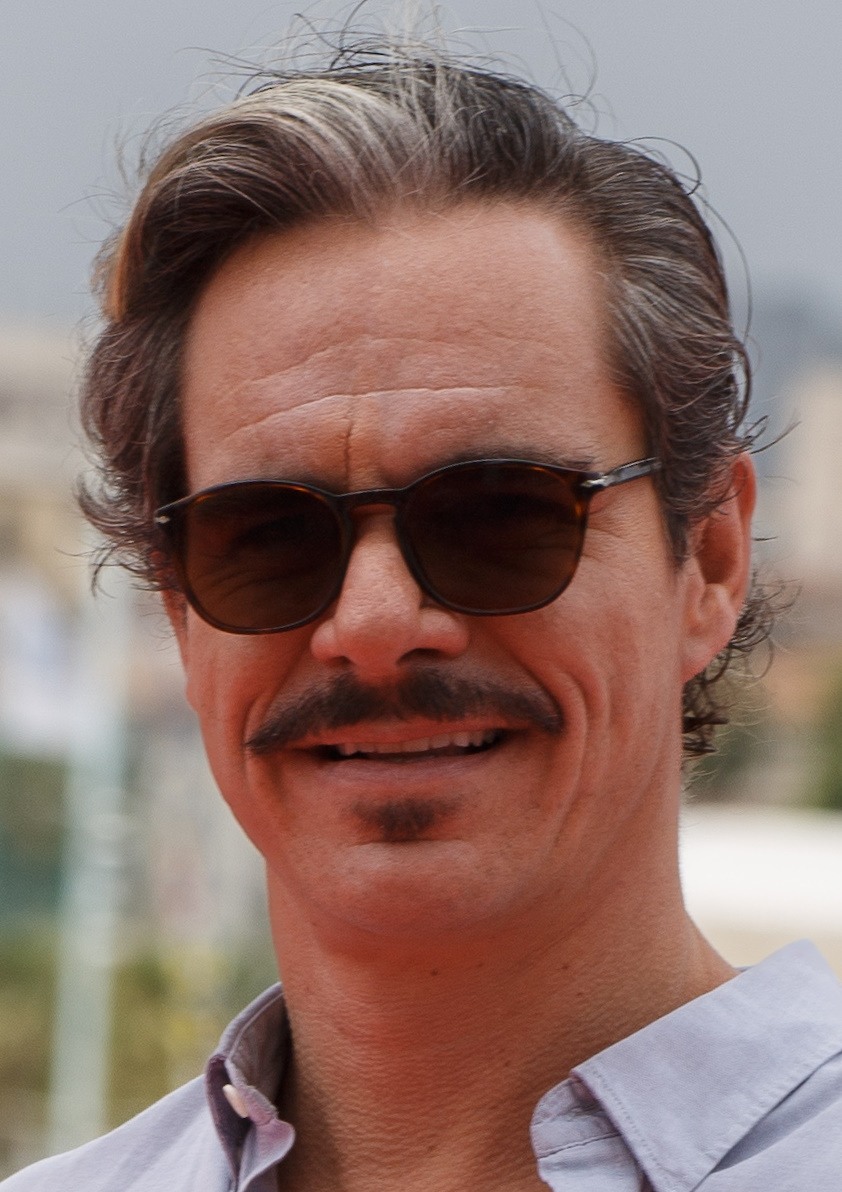
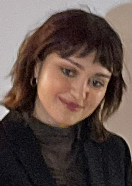
Critics praised the performances of Kaitlyn Dever, Catherine O'Hara, Jeffrey Wright, Joe Pantoliano (top), Isabela Merced, Young Mazino, Tony Dalton, and Ariela Barer (bottom), (Note: Attributed to multiple references, per actor: Kaitlyn Dever; Catherine O'Hara; Jeffrey Wright; Joe Pantoliano; Isabela Merced; Young Mazino; Tony Dalton; Ariela Barer) and the first four guest actors were nominated for Emmy Awards.

Critics praised the continued chemistry between Pascal and Ramsey; Rolling Stone's Alan Sepinwall found some episodes weaker for their absence, and /Film's Mathai considered their subtler moments the most effective. Critics lauded Pascal for bringing warmth, charisma, and hardiness to Joel—Collider's Bonaime called his performance his career-best—and Ramsey for developing Ellie into a traumatized young adult while maintaining emotional immaturity and playfulness. Many reviewers considered Merced the season's highlight for her compassion and humor, as well as her chemistry with Ramsey.

The season's guest performances were praised, including Dever for her portrayal of grief, rage, and hatred; some felt she upstaged others. Several critics applauded O'Hara's dramatic acting abilities, and Wright's captivating and menacing nature, immediately drawn in by his unsettling charisma. Reviewers praised Pantoliano for his depth and understated nature despite his limited appearance, and Dalton for his simultaneous warmth and firmness. Barer's performance was lauded for its powerful devastation, and praise was directed towards the performances of Luna, Mazino, and Wesley, though some reviewers considered them underserved and the characters underdeveloped. Inverse's Valerie Ettenhofer found some interactions "strangely artificial" in contrast to the first season.

=== Audience response ===
The season was review bombed on Rotten Tomatoes, dropping from a 61% approval rating after the first episode to 49% after the third, 39% after the sixth, and 37% after the finale. Similar bombing occurred on Metacritic, resulting in a user review score of 3.6/10 at its nadir, with 62% classified "negative". Initial backlash criticized Ramsey and Dever's lack of resemblance to their in-game characters, Joel's death and absence, and larger changes from the games like Abby's arc and Ellie's light-hearted attitude. As the season aired, journalists attributed much of the later backlash to complaints about "woke culture" and homophobia regarding Ellie and Dina's love story; Variety's Matt Minton called it "a sad reflection of the kind of hateful rhetoric becoming more and more common under the political climate". The fourth episode—featuring Ellie and Dina's sex scene—was the lowest-rated on IMDb, with over 20% of users scoring 1/10.

GameSpot's Lan Pitts noted most user reviews contained "nothing of nuance or value". While some users criticized Ramsey's acting, several mocked their appearance and gender identity, with Reddit communities largely dedicated to criticism and memes about their looks. Journalists identified a trend in young, female-presenting actors being targeted for their roles, such as Halle Bailey for The Little Mermaid (2023) and Rachel Zegler for Snow White (2025), sparking comparisons to Gamergate. Slate's Rebecca Onion lamented the inability to criticize the show without contributing to the online backlash. Many journalists compared the response to the video game, which was similarly review bombed; some—including Laura Bailey, who portrays Abby in the game—felt selected scenes were adapted differently in response to the game's backlash, like presenting Abby more sympathetically from her first appearance. Ramsey recommended that viewers who hate the series should "just play the game again ... but if you do wanna watch it, then I hope you enjoy it".

=== Ratings ===
Viewership for the first season surged by 150% in the week preceding the second-season premiere. The episode had 5.3 million viewers in the United States on its first night, including linear viewers and streams on Max—a 13% increase from the first-season premiere. Within a few hours, the season was the fifth-most-viewed across all streaming services for the week; it topped the chart for the following seven weeks. In Canada, it was the third-most in-demand show for the week within hours of premiering, and subsequently placed within the top two for the following seven weeks, peaking in the third with more than 76 times the average demand for television shows, before dropping to fourth in June.

Comparable to its first-season premiere, the series was streamed for 805 million minutes from April 14–20, ranking fifth for the week, and peaked at 937 million minutes from April 21–27, ranking third. It was streamed for 827 million minutes from April 28 – May 4, ranking fifth, and for 738, 745, and 707 million minutes from May 5–11, 12–18 and 19–25, respectively, ranking seventh. The Hollywood Reporter's James Hibberd noted second-season decreases were common, but attributed the 18% drop from the first season's opening five episodes to Joel's death, the satisfying conclusion of the first-season finale, and the inherent difficulty in telling Part II's story, comparable to Game of Thrones's final three seasons.

The finale had 3.7 million linear and streaming viewers on its first night—a 30% drop from the premiere and a 55% decrease from the first-season finale, which HBO attributed to the Memorial Day weekend, expecting viewership to grow later based on previous figures. The series was streamed for 661 million minutes from May 26 to June 1, ranking eleventh. It was popular with men in May, ranking eighth (313 million minutes) for non-fathers and eleventh (401 million) for fathers. By May, the season averaged almost 37 million global viewers per episode, larger than the first season's 90-day 32 million figure. The series overall had received over 90 million total global viewers since the first-season finale. It was Max's most popular show for new subscribers—around 441,000 viewers—for the first half of 2025.

Viewership and ratings per episode of The Last of Us season 2
No.	Title	Air date	Rating (18–49)	Viewers (millions)	Ref.
1	"Future Days"	April 13, 2025	0.31	0.938	
2	"Through the Valley"	April 20, 2025	0.16	0.643	
3	"The Path"	April 27, 2025	0.18	0.768	
4	"Day One"	May 4, 2025	0.20	0.774	
5	"Feel Her Love"	May 11, 2025	0.14	0.652	
6	"The Price"	May 18, 2025	0.16	0.701	
7	"Convergence"	May 25, 2025	0.17	0.680	

=== Commercial impact ===
Daily active users of Part I, Part II, and the Max application rose by 40% following the season premiere, while Max downloads increased by 6%. In the week of the finale's airing, Part II Remastered and Part I were the first- and third-best-selling PlayStation 5 games on Amazon in the United States, and the former re-entered the charts as the sixth-best-selling physical game in the United Kingdom. According to media analyst Chris Colombo, Part II Remastered sold approximately two million units as the season was airing, while the series achieved an estimated US$72 million in subscriber value for Max.

=== Awards and nominations ===
The Last of Us led the television nominees of the 25th Golden Trailer Awards with nine nominations for its marketing, winning Best Drama / Action Poster, and the 5th Critics' Choice Super Awards with six nominations, of which it won two. It received 13 nominations at the 5th Astra TV Awards, including Best Drama Series and nine acting nominees; Merced and Wright won Best Supporting Actress and Best Guest Actor in a Drama Series, respectively. Merced won the Next Generation Impact Award at the NHMC Impact Awards Gala for her roles in The Last of Us and Superman (2025), and Mazino received an honorable mention for Outstanding Supporting Performance from Gold House's Gold List in Television.

The season received 17 nominations at the 77th Primetime Emmy Awards, including Outstanding Drama Series, Pascal and Ramsey for Outstanding Lead Actor and Lead Actress, Pantoliano and Wright for Guest Actor, Dever and O'Hara for Guest Actress, and multiple nominations in technical categories. Pascal's limited second-season role prompted a decision between a lead or supporting actor submission, while Dever similarly had to decide between supporting and guest actress. Ramsey's nomination made them the first non-binary performer to receive a second nomination and the youngest two-time lead drama actress nominee, while Pascal became the second Latino nominated for lead drama actor more than once and the first since 1999.
