= Four Sigmatic =

Food and beverages company

- Type: Private
- Industry: Health & Wellness
- Founded: 2012
- Headquarters: Los Angeles, California
- Website: us.foursigmatic.com

Four Sigmatic is a Finnish-American functional foods company. The company is headquartered in Los Angeles, California. Four Sigmatic sells various coffee products, plant-based proteins, wellness supplements, beauty products, and other so-called superfood products.

== History ==
The company's predecessor LUONTOlife was founded in 2011 by Finnish entrepreneurs Tero Isokauppila, Mikko Revonniemi and Mika Rantanen. LUONTOlife was based in Hong Kong, and sold blenders, mushroom elixirs, herbal extracts, and raw honey under the Four Sigma Foods brand name. In 2014, Isokauppila founded a new US based company Funguys, Inc.

In 2015, alongside original LUONTOlife employees Mikael Makinen and Markus Karjalainen, the company launched in the U.S. In the same year, the company launched its flagship Mushroom Coffee product and moved its headquarters to Santa Monica, CA. In 2016, the company rebranded as Four Sigmatic.

In 2018 the company received approximately $5 million in a Series A round of private funding from investors including AF Ventures and Lyra Growth Partners.

As of 2021, the company's products are available in 65 countries.

Isokauppila was chosen twice as one of the world's Top 50 Food Activists by the Academy of Culinary Nutrition.
