= The Last of Us (TV series) =

2023 American television series

- Genre: Post-apocalyptic; Drama; Thriller
- Created by: Craig Mazin; Neil Druckmann
- Based on: The Last of Us by Naughty Dog (Note: The Last of Us was developed by Naughty Dog and published by Sony Interactive Entertainment. Neil Druckmann was the writer and creative director, serving alongside game directors Bruce Straley for the first game and Anthony Newman and Kurt Margenau for the second. Halley Gross co-wrote the second.)
- Showrunners: Craig Mazin; Neil Druckmann
- Written by: Craig Mazin; Neil Druckmann; Halley Gross
- Starring: Pedro Pascal; Bella Ramsey; Gabriel Luna; Isabela Merced; Young Mazino
- Theme music composer: Gustavo Santaolalla
- Composers: Gustavo Santaolalla; David Fleming
- Country of origin: United States
- Original language: English
- No. of seasons: 2
- No. of episodes: 16

Production
- Executive producers: Craig Mazin; Neil Druckmann; Carolyn Strauss; Rose Lam; Evan Wells; Carter Swan; Asad Qizilbash; Jacqueline Lesko; Cecil O'Connor; Halley Gross
- Producers: Greg Spence; Cecil O'Connor; Allen Marshall Palmer; Julie Herrin; Leeann Stonebreaker
- Production location: Canada
- Cinematography: Ksenia Sereda; Eben Bolter; Christine A. Maier; Nadim Carlsen; Catherine Goldschmidt
- Editors: Timothy A. Good; Mark Hartzell; Emily Mendez; Cindy Mollo; Simon Smith
- Running time: 43–81 minutes
- Production companies: The Mighty Mint; Word Games; PlayStation Productions; Naughty Dog; Sony Pictures Television (Note: Formerly credited to its Sony Pictures Television Studios division)

Original release
- Network: HBO
- Release: January 15, 2023 – present

The Last of Us is an American post-apocalyptic drama television series created by Craig Mazin and Neil Druckmann for HBO. Based on the video game franchise developed by Naughty Dog, the series is set decades after the collapse of society caused by a mass fungal infection that transforms its hosts into zombie-like creatures. The first season, based on 2013's The Last of Us, follows Joel (Pedro Pascal) and Ellie (Bella Ramsey) as they travel across the United States. In the second season, based on the first half of 2020's The Last of Us Part II, they have settled in Jackson, Wyoming, with Joel's brother Tommy (Gabriel Luna) and Ellie's friends Dina (Isabela Merced) and Jesse (Young Mazino). The group travels to Seattle to track down Abby (Kaitlyn Dever), who is set to be the focus of the third season.

The series follows several characters. The first season sought high-profile guest stars, such as Anna Torv as Joel's partner Tess, Merle Dandridge and Melanie Lynskey as resistance leaders Marlene and Kathleen, Nick Offerman and Murray Bartlett as survivalists Bill and Frank, Rutina Wesley as Tommy's wife Maria, and Storm Reid as Ellie's best friend Riley. Wesley returned in the second season, which introduces Jeffrey Wright as militia leader Isaac, and Spencer Lord, Tati Gabrielle, Ariela Barer, and Danny Ramirez as Abby's friends Owen, Nora, Mel, and Manny, respectively. The third season is set to introduce Michelle Mao and Kyriana Kratter as Yara and Lev, members of the Seraphites, a Seattle-based religious group.

The first season was filmed in Alberta from July 2021 to June 2022, while the second was filmed in British Columbia from February to August 2024; the third is filming in British Columbia from March 2026 to February 2027. One of the most expensive television series, it is a joint production by Sony Pictures Television, PlayStation Productions, Naughty Dog, the Mighty Mint, and Word Games. Druckmann, who wrote and co-directed the games, assisted Mazin with scriptwriting for the first season's nine episodes; they were joined by Halley Gross, who co-wrote Part II, for the second season's seven. The score was composed by Gustavo Santaolalla, who composed for the games, and David Fleming.

The Last of Us premiered on January 15, 2023. Across linear channels and HBO Max, the series premiere was watched by almost 40 million viewers within two months; the series averaged almost 32 million viewers per episode by May, and it became HBO's most watched debut season. The second season premiered on April 13, 2025, and averaged almost 37 million viewers within two months. A third season is expected to air in 2027. The series received critical acclaim for its performances, writing, production design, direction, and score; several critics called it the best adaptation of a video game. It won several accolades, including nine Primetime Emmy Awards.

== Plot ==
The Last of Us is set decades after the collapse of society caused by a mass fungal infection of mutated Cordyceps that transforms its hosts into zombie-like creatures. In the first season, based on The Last of Us (2013), Joel is tasked with escorting an immune teenage girl, Ellie, across the United States to reach the Fireflies, a group of revolutionaries hoping to create a cure. Joel slaughters the Fireflies and their head doctor after discovering that synthesizing a cure would kill Ellie, and lies to her that the Fireflies had already failed to develop a cure from other immune patients.

In the second season, based on the first half of The Last of Us Part II (2020), Joel and Ellie have settled in the safe community of Jackson, Wyoming, with Joel's brother Tommy and Ellie's friends Dina and Jesse. Over five years, Joel and Ellie's relationship becomes strained due to Joel's lie. After Abby kills Joel for the death of her father, the Firefly head doctor, Ellie and Dina travel to Seattle to track her down. Ellie kills some of Abby's friends over three days before Jesse and Tommy arrive and convince her to return home. Before they can do so, Abby kills Jesse and confronts Ellie.

The third season, based on the second half of The Last of Us Part II, is set to follow Abby's three days in Seattle with her friends Owen, Nora, Mel, and Manny. Abby has her worldview challenged after meeting Yara and Lev, members of the religious group Seraphites.

== Cast and characters ==
=== Main ===
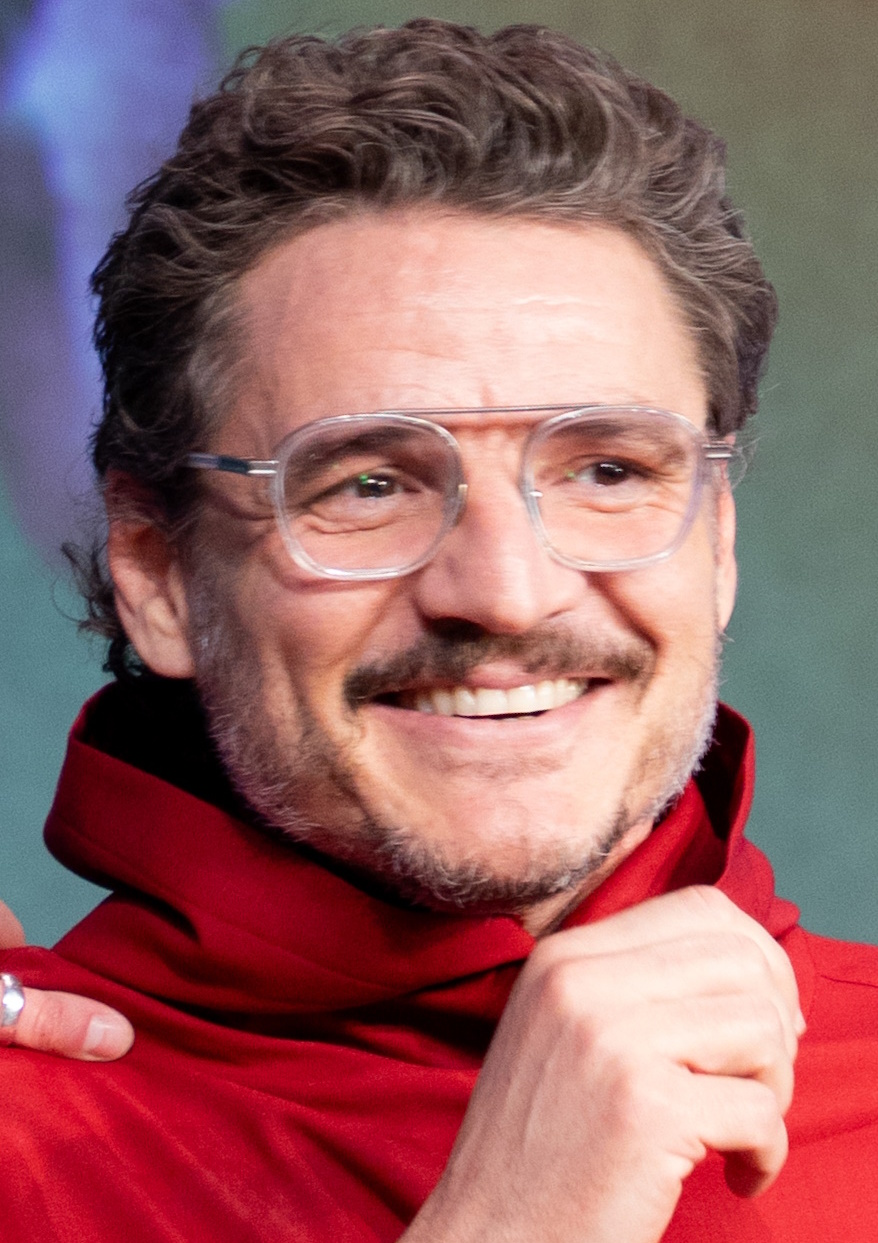
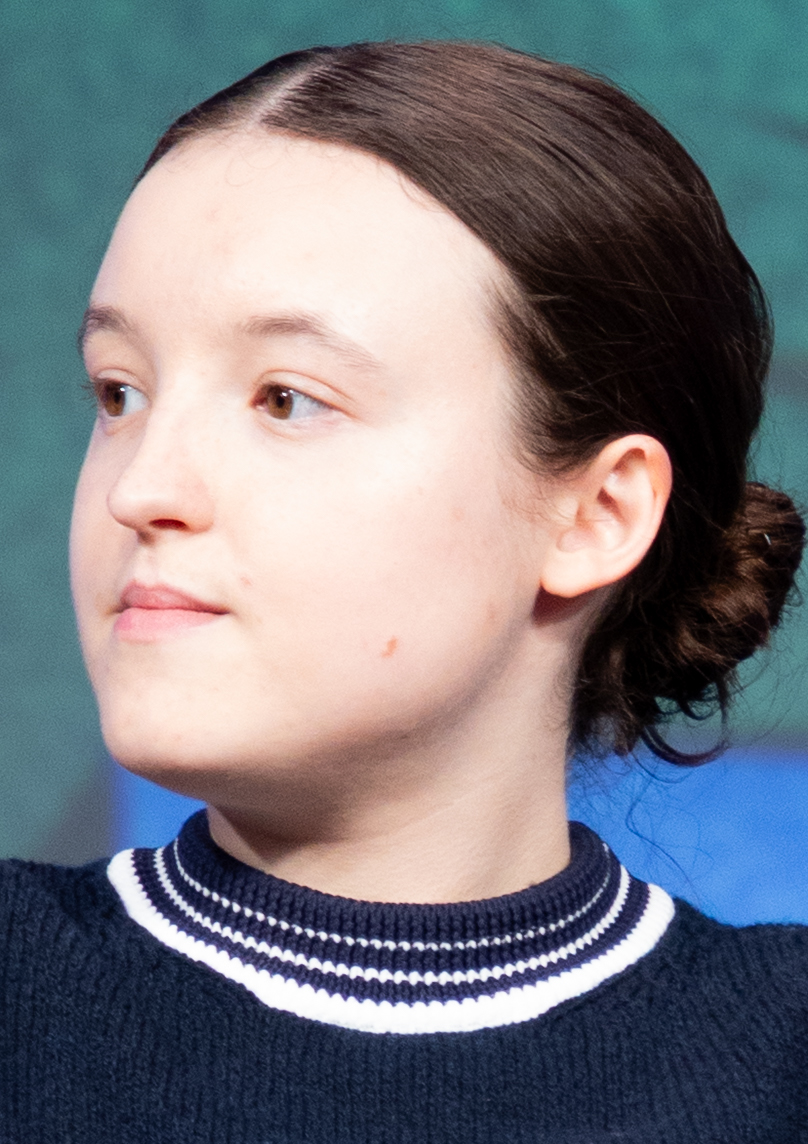
Pedro Pascal and Bella Ramsey portray the lead characters, Joel and Ellie.
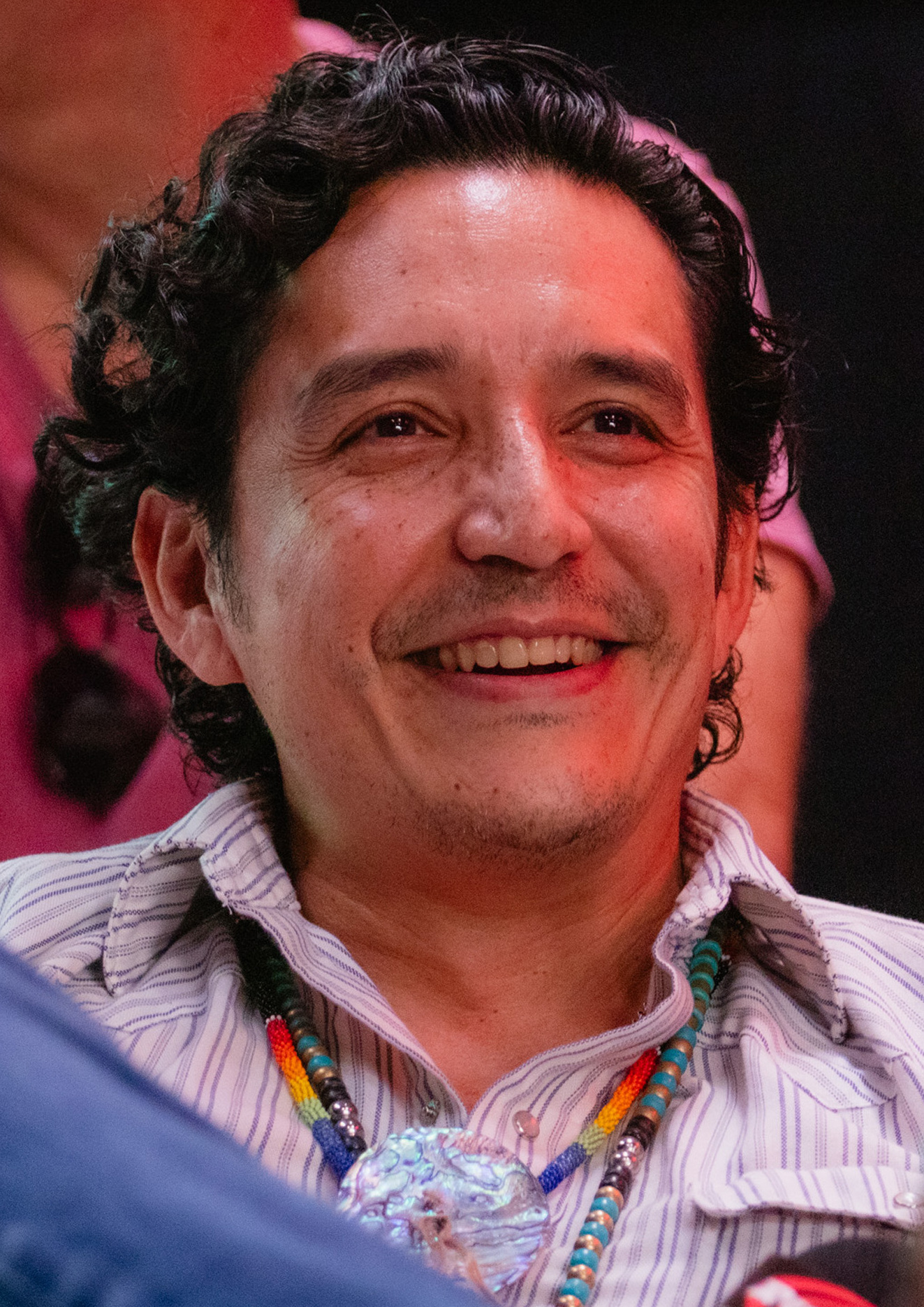
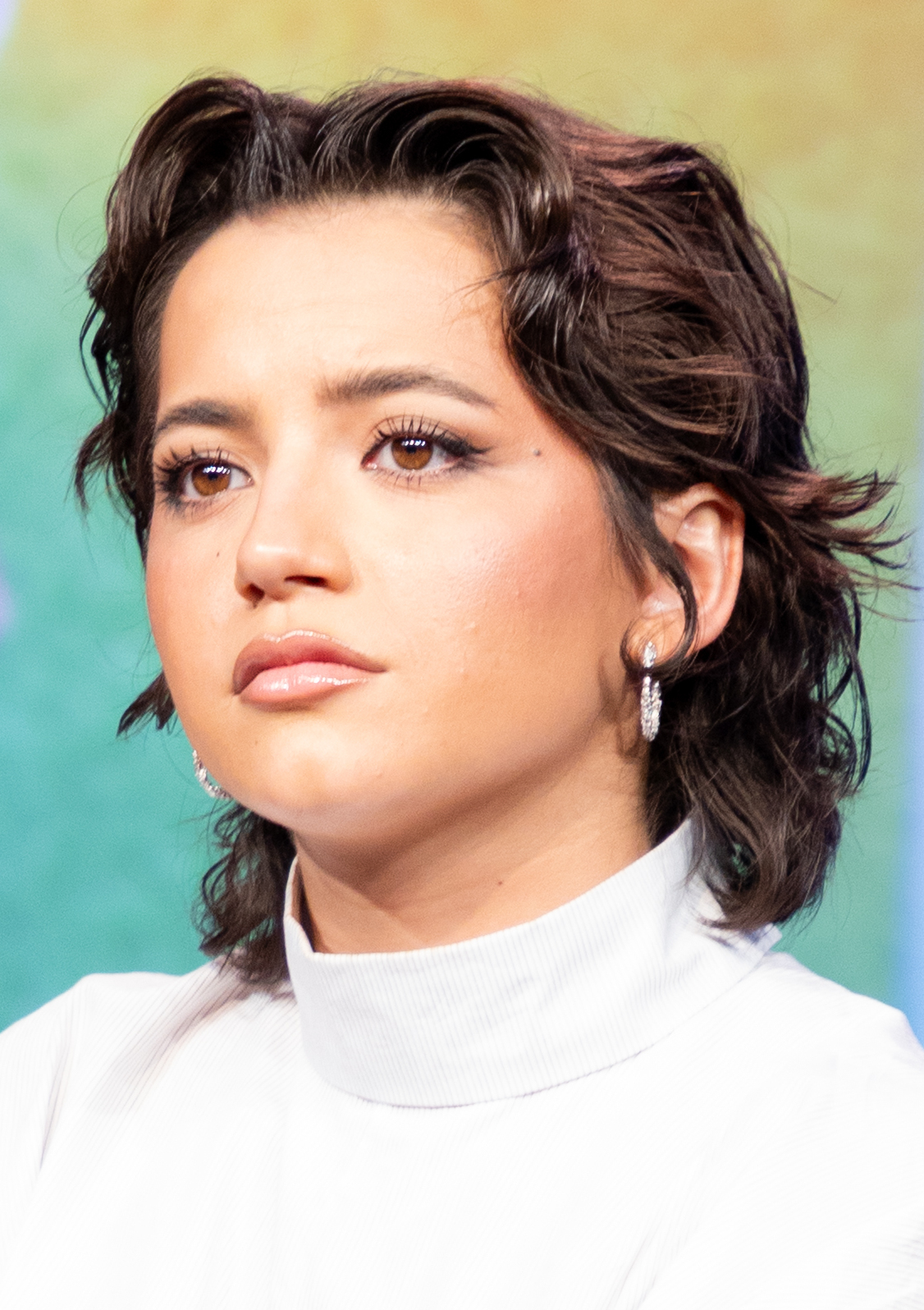
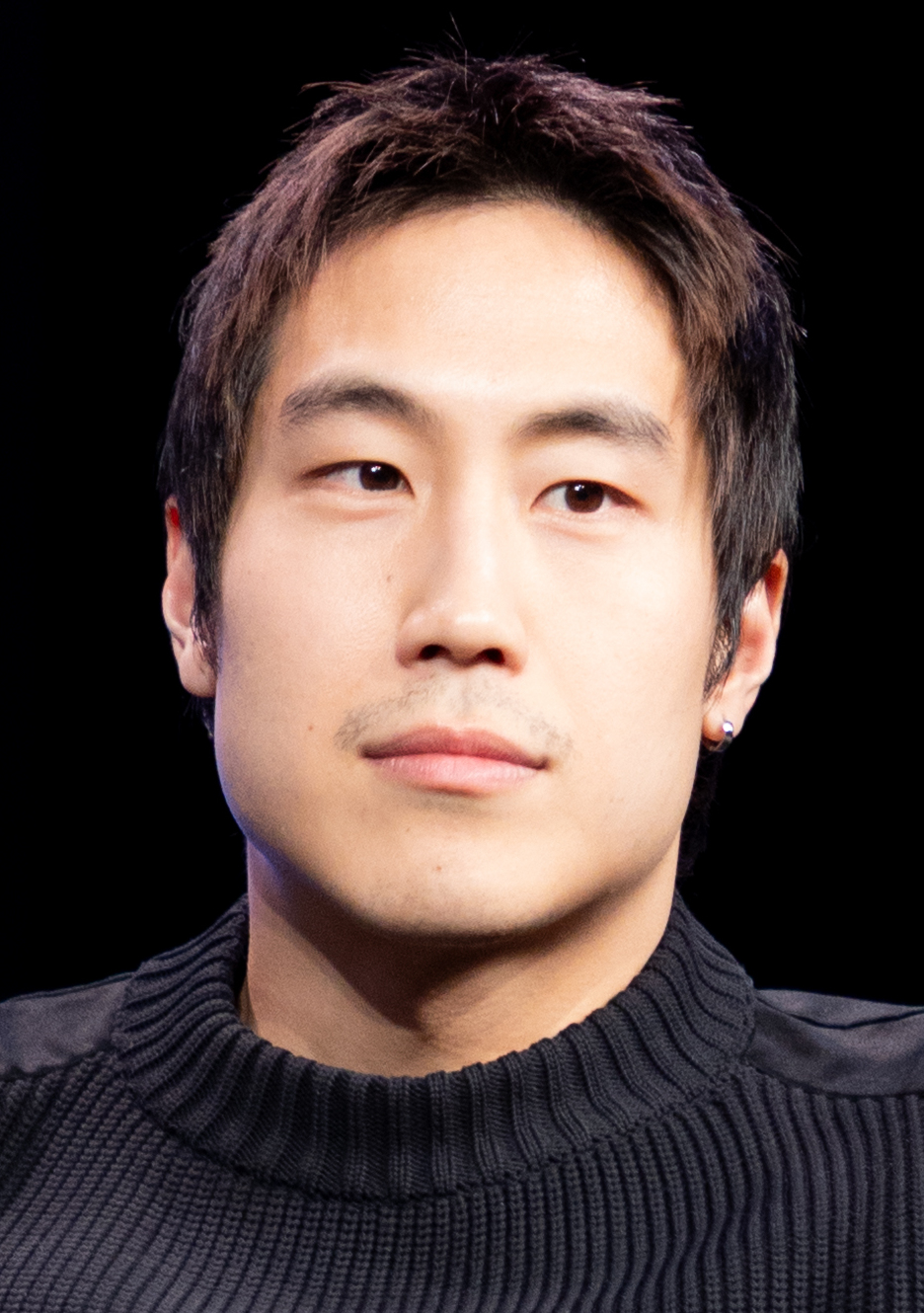
Gabriel Luna became a series regular in the second season alongside new cast members Isabela Merced and Young Mazino.
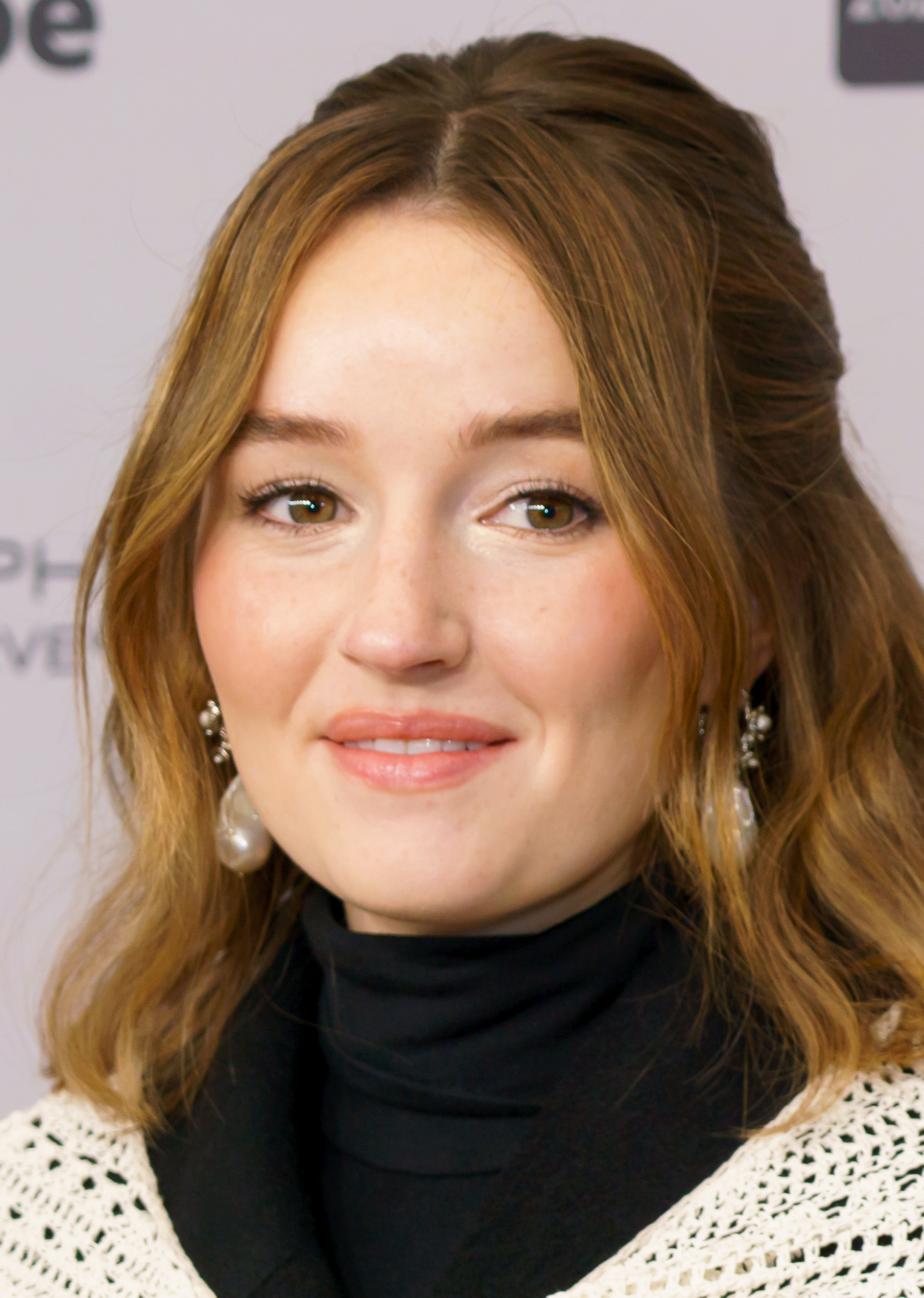
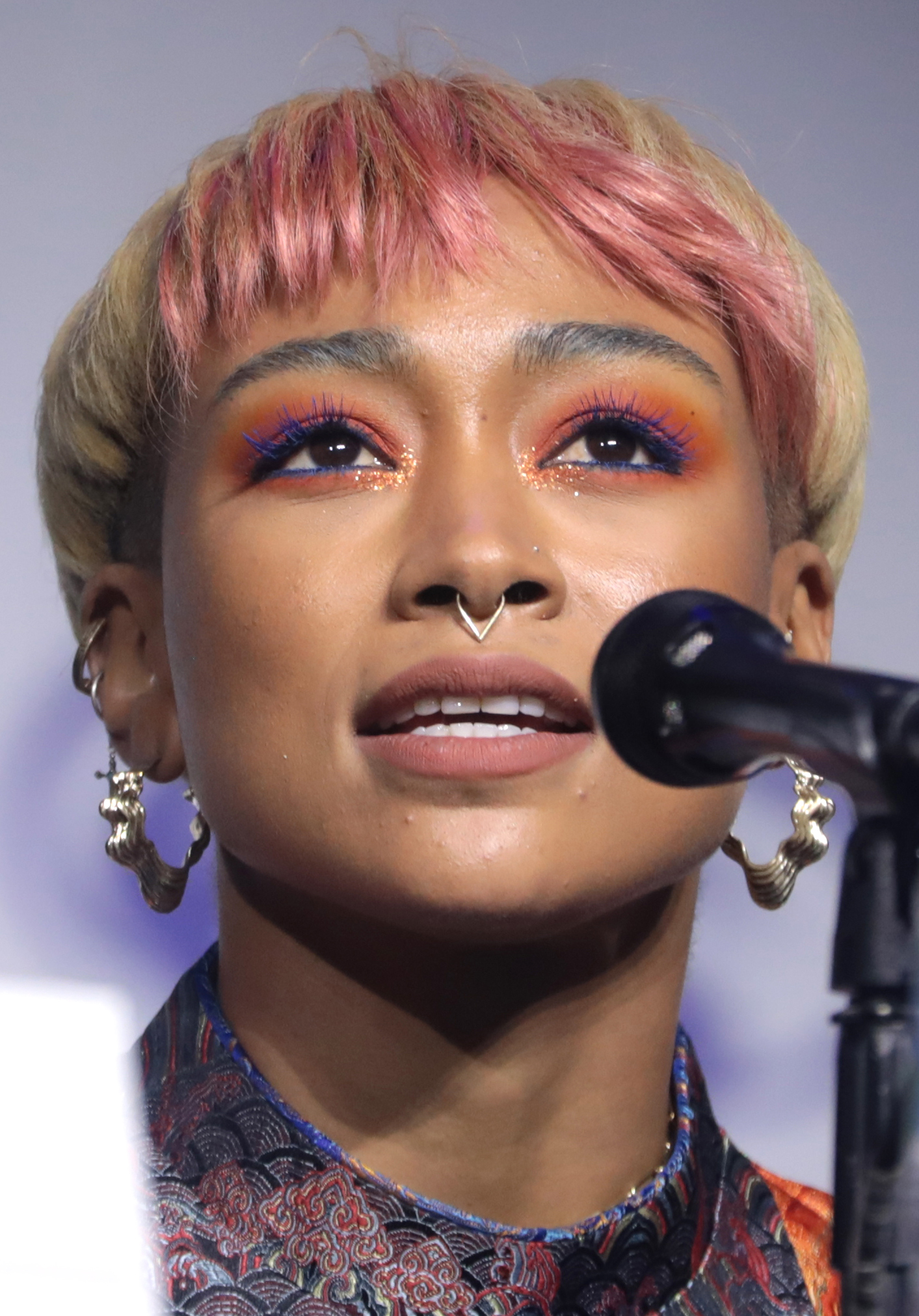
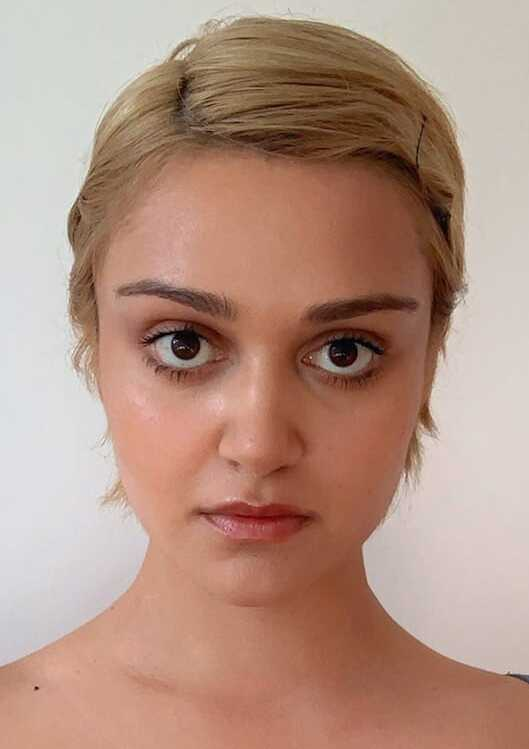
Kaitlyn Dever (left), Tati Gabrielle (center), Ariela Barer (right), and Spencer Lord were promoted to series regulars for the third season alongside newcomers Michelle Mao and Kyriana Kratter.
- Pedro Pascal as Joel Miller (seasons 1–2), a hardened middle-aged survivor who is tormented by the trauma of his past. He is tasked with smuggling a young girl, Ellie, out of a quarantine zone and across the United States. Joel is portrayed as more physically vulnerable in the series compared to the game—he is hard of hearing in one ear and his knees ache when he stands.
- Bella Ramsey as Ellie, a teenage girl who displays defiance and anger but has a private need for kinship and belonging. She is strong-willed but playful, bonding easily with children, and has a fondness for puns. She is immune to the Cordyceps infection and may be the key to creating a vaccine. In the second season, her relationship with Joel has become strained.
- Gabriel Luna as Tommy Miller (seasons 2–3; guest season 1), Joel's younger brother, who maintains idealism in hoping for a better world. A former member of the Fireflies, a revolutionary militia group, Tommy gave up on their cause and runs a commune with his wife, Maria, in Jackson, Wyoming. They have a son named Benjamin, nicknamed "Benji".
- Isabela Merced as Dina (seasons 2–3), Ellie's girlfriend. She is Jesse's ex, and pregnant with his child. She is a freewheeling spirit with a loyalty towards Ellie, which is challenged by the world's brutality.
- Young Mazino as Jesse (seasons 2–3), Dina's ex and an important member of Jackson whose selflessness sometimes comes at a cost. Having lost everything prior to joining Jackson, he values its sense of community and works hard to ensure it is not lost.
- Kaitlyn Dever as Abby (season 3; recurring season 2), who seeks revenge against Joel for the death of her father and subsequently has her worldview challenged. A former Firefly in Salt Lake City, she is a soldier with the Washington Liberation Front (WLF) in Seattle.
- Spencer Lord as Owen (season 3; recurring season 2), a WLF member and a former Firefly who witnessed Joel's massacre in Salt Lake City. He is a gentle person whose physical strength forces him to fight enemies he does not hate.
- Tati Gabrielle as Nora (season 3; recurring season 2), a former Firefly. She is a WLF military medic who has difficulty accepting her past behavior.
- Ariela Barer as Mel (season 3; recurring season 2), a former Firefly and Owen's girlfriend. She is a WLF military doctor committed to her role while struggling with the realities of war, reluctant to hurt others.
- Michelle Mao as Yara (season 3), a member of the Seraphites, a religious group based in Seattle. She is Lev's sister who meets Abby on her journey.
- Kyriana Kratter as Lev (season 3), a member of the Seraphites. He is a 13-year-old transgender boy and Yara's brother.

=== Recurring ===
- Anna Torv as Tess (season 1), a hardened survivor and Joel's partner. Tess is respected in the Boston Quarantine Zone, largely out of fear. She is protective of Ellie during their escort mission.
- Rutina Wesley as Maria (season 2; guest season 1), a co-leader of Jackson. She is Tommy's wife and Benjamin's mother. Formerly an assistant district attorney, Maria is calm and merciful.
- Robert John Burke as Seth (season 2), a former police officer who runs a bar in Jackson. He has traditional values and helps Ellie and Dina after drunkenly insulting them.
- Danny Ramirez (season 2) and Jorge Lendeborg Jr. (season 3) as Manny, a WLF member and a former Firefly. A loyal soldier who fears failing his friends, he maintains a jovial attitude despite the pain of his past. The character was recast for the third season due to scheduling conflicts.
- Catherine O'Hara as Gail (season 2), Joel's therapist and Eugene's wife. She is cynical, not deceived by Joel's posturing.
- Jeffrey Wright as Isaac Dixon (season 3; guest season 2), the ruthless leader of the WLF and a former high-ranking sergeant for the Federal Disaster Response Agency (FEDRA). The WLF face a war in their pursuit for liberty. Wright reprises his role from the video game.
- Jason Ritter as Hanley (season 3), a WLF soldier. Ritter previously had a cameo appearance in the first season as a clicker.
- Patrick Wilson as Jerry (season 3), Abby's father whom Joel killed. The character was briefly portrayed by Darren Dolynski in the first-season finale.
- Peter Sarsgaard as Amon (season 3), a leader of the Seraphites

=== Guest ===
==== Season 1 ====
- Nico Parker as Sarah, Joel's 14-year-old daughter. She cares for her father, playfully teasing him over his behavior and attitude.
- John Hannah as Dr. Neuman, an epidemiologist who issues a warning about the threat of fungi during a talk show in 1968.
- Merle Dandridge as Marlene, the head of the Fireflies, a resistance movement hoping to gain freedom from the military. Dandridge reprises her role from the video games.
- Christopher Heyerdahl as Dr. Schoenheiss, an epidemiologist on the 1968 talk show who is skeptical of Neuman's warning.
- Brendan Fletcher as Robert, a thug and black market arms dealer in the Boston Quarantine Zone. Robert fears Joel's retribution against his actions.
- Christine Hakim as Ratna Pertiwi, a mycology professor who advises the Indonesian government to bomb Jakarta to slow the spread of the infection, for which she feels hopeless.
- Nick Offerman as Bill, a misanthropic survivalist. Bill's paranoia and distrust of the government left him prepared for the pandemic, protected in an underground bunker.
- Murray Bartlett as Frank, a survivalist living in an isolated town with Bill. Frank is friendlier and more trusting than Bill, forming a close bond with Tess and Joel.
- Lamar Johnson as Henry Burrell, who is hiding from a revolutionary movement in Kansas City. Henry is hurt by his own actions but ultimately does them to protect his younger brother Sam.
- Melanie Lynskey as Kathleen Coghlan, the leader of a revolutionary movement in Kansas City. Kathleen is soft-spoken and outwardly sweet but an intelligent and often ruthless leader.
- Keivonn Montreal Woodard as Sam, a deaf, artistic eight-year-old child who is hiding with his brother Henry. Sam was diagnosed with leukemia at a young age.
- Jeffrey Pierce as Perry, a revolutionary rebel in a quarantine zone and former military member, who is Kathleen's second-in-command. Pierce portrayed Tommy in the video games.
- John Getz as Edelstein, a Kansas City doctor who protects Henry and Sam from Kathleen and the rebels.
- Graham Greene as Marlon, a Native American hunter who has lived with his wife Florence in the wilderness of Wyoming since before the pandemic. Marlon is resourceful and untrusting of strangers.
- Elaine Miles as Florence, who lives with her husband Marlon. Florence is calm and humorous. Unlike Marlon, she did not want to isolate in the wilderness.
- Storm Reid as Riley Abel, an orphaned girl who is Ellie's best friend at military school in post-apocalyptic Boston. Riley ran away from military school to join the Fireflies, considering the former to be fascists.
- Scott Shepherd as David, a preacher who leads a struggling community. David is calm and acts as a caring leader, but is manipulative and abusive. He claims to have found God after the outbreak and views the virus as a form of divine justice.
- Troy Baker as James, David's aide. James lacks faith in David but wants to be considered his equal, feeling threatened when Ellie's capabilities threaten to usurp his position. Baker previously portrayed Joel in the video games.
- Ashley Johnson as Anna, Ellie's mother. Anna is resourceful, killing an infected while giving birth. She is close with Marlene; upon giving birth to Ellie, she tasks Marlene with caring for Ellie after she becomes infected. Johnson previously portrayed Ellie in the video games.

==== Season 2 ====
- Noah Lamanna as Kat, Ellie's ex and the only other openly queer member of Jackson. She is only mentioned in the video game.
- Alanna Ubach as Hanrahan, a high-ranking WLF member
- Josh Peck as Janowicz, a FEDRA soldier in Seattle under Isaac's command. He jokes with other soldiers about the harassment and abuse of civilians.
- Ben Ahlers as Burton, a loyal and hardened WLF soldier. He was recruited by Isaac as a new FEDRA recruit.
- Hettienne Park as Elise Park, a WLF sergeant whose soldier son was infected through spores. The character is original to the series.
- Tony Dalton as Javier Miller, Joel and Tommy's father. An original character to the series, he is a police officer with a history of using violence to discipline his sons, having been abused even more violently by his own father as a child.
- Joe Pantoliano as Eugene Lynden, Gail's husband who was killed by Joel after being infected. The character is only seen in a photograph in the game.

==== Season 3 ====
- Clea DuVall as a member of the Seraphites, a religious group based in Seattle
- Li Jun Li as Miriam, a member of the Seraphites and Yara and Lev's mother
- John Goodman as Joey, part of a "friendly duo" who call themselves "Heroes of the Highway"
- Ian Alexander as Paco, part of the "Heroes of the Highway" duo. Alexander previously portrayed Lev in The Last of Us Part II.
- Laura Bailey as Elizabeth, a leader of the Seraphites. Bailey previously portrayed Abby in Part II, as well as a nurse in the first game and the first-season finale.

== Episodes ==
Season	Episodes	Originally released	
Season	Episodes	First released	Last released
1	9	January 15, 2023	March 12, 2023
2	7	April 13, 2025	May 25, 2025
3	TBA	2027	TBA

=== Season 1 (2023) ===
No. overall	No. in season	Title	Directed by	Written by	Original release date	U.S. viewers (millions)
1	1	"When You're Lost in the Darkness"	Craig Mazin	Craig Mazin & Neil Druckmann	January 15, 2023	0.588
2	2	"Infected"	Neil Druckmann	Craig Mazin	January 22, 2023	0.633
3	3	"Long, Long Time"	Peter Hoar	Craig Mazin	January 29, 2023	0.747
4	4	"Please Hold to My Hand"	Jeremy Webb	Craig Mazin	February 5, 2023	0.991
5	5	"Endure and Survive"	Jeremy Webb	Craig Mazin	February 12, 2023 (Note: The episode was released online on HBO Max and HBO on Demand on February 10, 2023, ahead of its broadcast on television to avoid conflicting with Super Bowl LVII.)	0.382
6	6	"Kin"	Jasmila Žbanić	Craig Mazin	February 19, 2023	0.841
7	7	"Left Behind"	Liza Johnson	Neil Druckmann	February 26, 2023	1.083
8	8	"When We Are in Need"	Ali Abbasi	Craig Mazin	March 5, 2023	1.039
9	9	"Look for the Light"	Ali Abbasi	Craig Mazin & Neil Druckmann	March 12, 2023	1.040

=== Season 2 (2025) ===
No. overall	No. in season	Title	Directed by	Written by	Original release date	U.S. viewers (millions)
10	1	"Future Days"	Craig Mazin	Craig Mazin	April 13, 2025	0.938
11	2	"Through the Valley"	Mark Mylod	Craig Mazin	April 20, 2025	0.643
12	3	"The Path"	Peter Hoar	Craig Mazin	April 27, 2025	0.768
13	4	"Day One"	Kate Herron	Craig Mazin	May 4, 2025	0.774
14	5	"Feel Her Love"	Stephen Williams	Craig Mazin	May 11, 2025	0.652
15	6	"The Price"	Neil Druckmann	Neil Druckmann & Halley Gross & Craig Mazin	May 18, 2025	0.701
16	7	"Convergence"	Nina Lopez-Corrado	Neil Druckmann & Halley Gross & Craig Mazin	May 25, 2025	0.680

== Production ==
=== Development ===
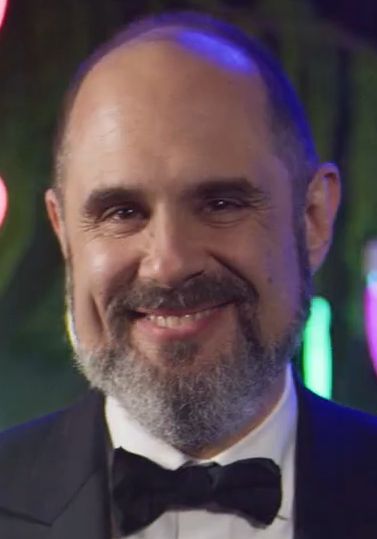
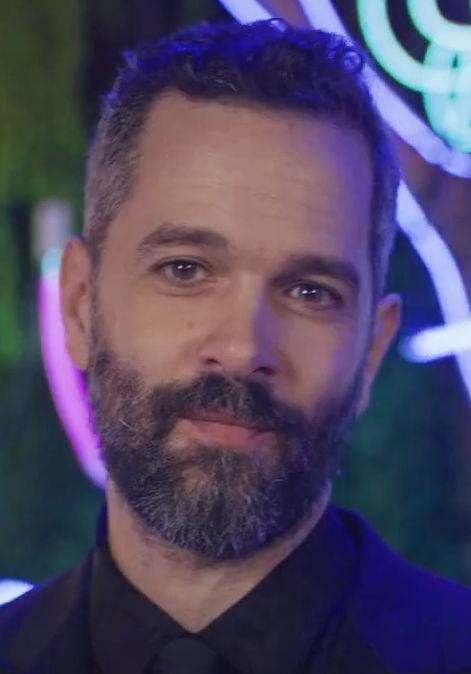
The Last of Us was created by Craig Mazin (left) and Neil Druckmann (right). Druckmann wrote and co-directed the video games.

A film adaptation of Naughty Dog's video game The Last of Us (2013) was announced in 2014, to be written by its creative director and writer Neil Druckmann; it entered development hell by 2016 and the rights had relinquished by 2019, when Druckmann met Craig Mazin. They agreed an adaptation required a television series's length and pacing. HBO announced the series was in planning stages in March 2020, written by Mazin and Druckmann, also serving as executive producers with Carolyn Strauss and Evan Wells. It is PlayStation Productions's first show, announced as a joint production with Sony Pictures Television and Naughty Dog. HBO greenlit the series in November, adding executive producers Asad Qizilbash and Carter Swan and production company Word Games, followed by production company the Mighty Mint in January 2021 and executive producer Rose Lam in February. Produced by Greg Spence and Cecil O'Connor, the first season's ten-episode count was reduced to nine during production.

On January 27, 2023, less than two weeks after the premiere, HBO renewed the series for a second season. While the first season covers the events of the first game and its downloadable expansion The Last of Us: Left Behind (2014), the second covers the first half of the sequel, The Last of Us Part II (2020); the second half is set to span up to two more seasons. Jacqueline Lesko was named an executive producer in March 2023, and O'Connor by February 2024. Kate Herron, Nina Lopez-Corrado, Mark Mylod, and Stephen Williams were announced as second-season directors alongside Druckmann, Hoar, and Mazin in January 2024. The season's seven episodes, revealed in June, were produced by Allen Marshall Palmer and Julie Herrin.

HBO renewed the series for a third season on April 9, 2025, ahead of the premiere of the second. Halley Gross, who co-wrote Part II with Druckmann, joined the second season as a writer and co-executive producer, and became an executive producer for the third. Druckmann and Gross stepped away from their creative duties on the series to work on other projects in July 2025; Mazin remained as sole showrunner. He directed the third-season premiere; other directors include Vincenzo Natali, David Petrarca, Andrew Bernstein, and Hiromi Kamata. The third season, produced by Leeann Stonebreaker, is set to be longer and "significantly larger". A fourth season was expected, though Mazin had not decided by July 2025, and Druckmann and HBO's Casey Bloys indicated the third would be the last. The series's narrative is not set to overtake the games.

The Last of Us is the largest television production to be filmed in Alberta and possibly the largest in Canadian history, generating CA$182 million for Alberta and creating 1,490 jobs. According to Canadian artists union IATSE 212, the production led to a 30% increase in union membership and employment. The first season's budget of over CA$100 million—more than $10 million per episode—exceeded that of each of Game of Thrones's first five seasons, making it one of the most expensive television series. The budget increased for the second season.

=== Casting ===
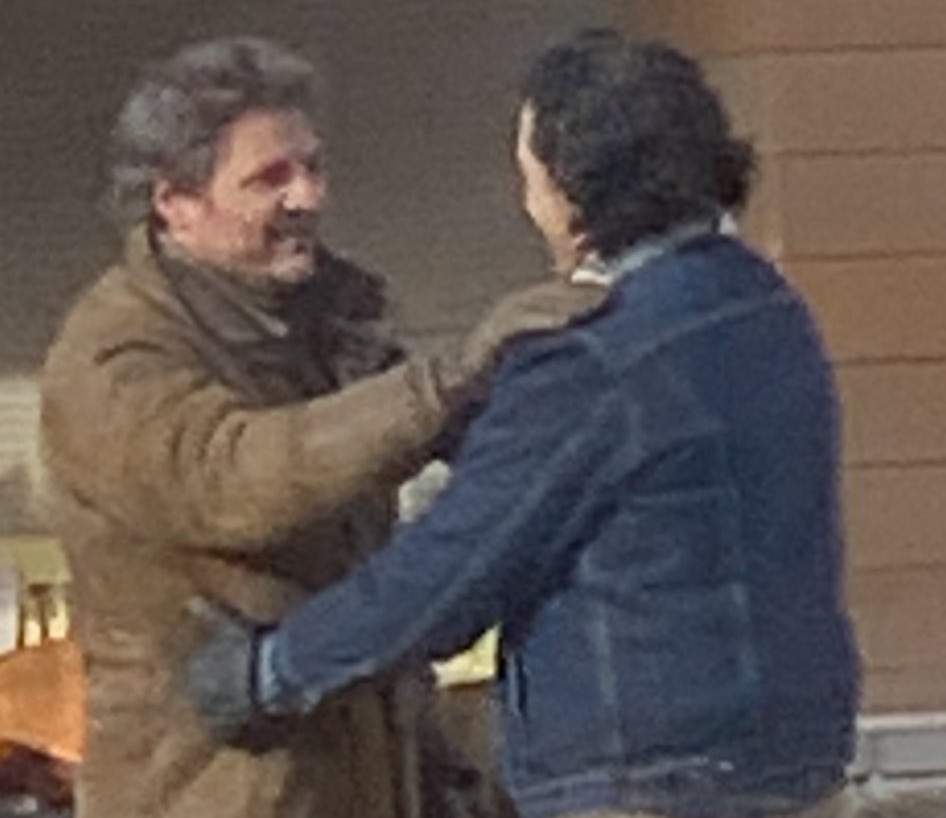
Pedro Pascal and Gabriel Luna in Canmore, November 2021

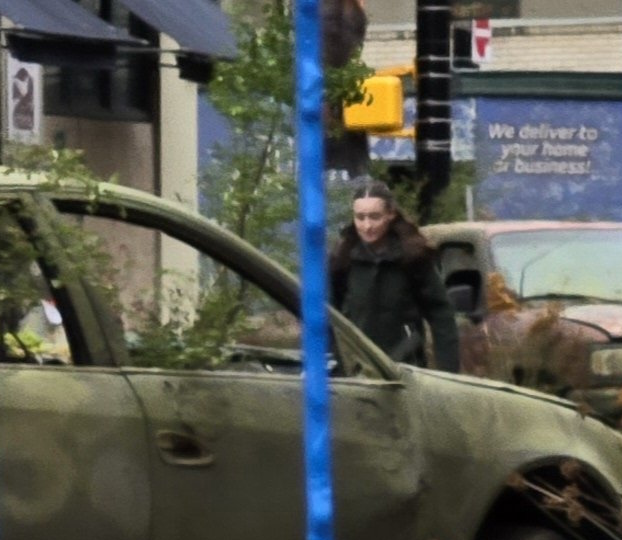
Bella Ramsey in Downtown Vancouver, August 2024

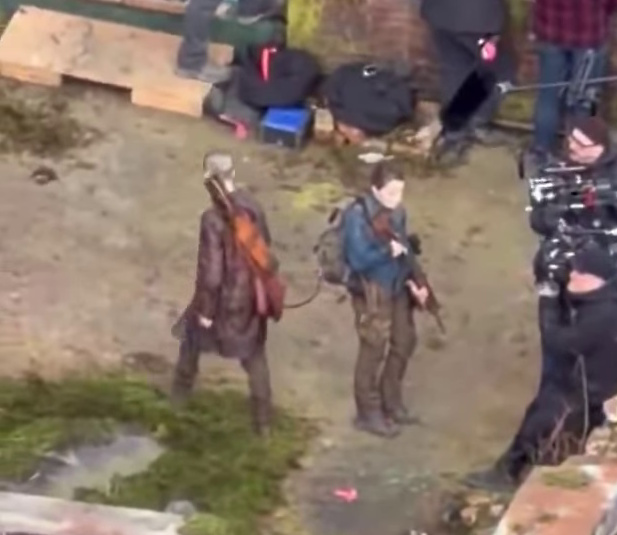
Kyriana Kratter and Kaitlyn Dever in Gastown, March 2026

Casting for the first season took place virtually through Zoom due to the COVID-19 pandemic. Casting director Victoria Thomas wanted to honor the game without being limited by it. On February 10, 2021, Pascal and Ramsey were cast as Joel and Ellie. The producers sought actors who could embody Joel and Ellie individually and imitate their relationship. Though both were featured on Game of Thrones, Pascal and Ramsey had not met before the filming of The Last of Us began but found they had instant chemistry, which developed over production.

When casting actors, Mazin is more interested in their "souls" than their physical resemblance to the game versions. Mazin and Thomas sought high-profile guest stars; Thomas said many of the actors "don't usually do one-episode guest spots". Guest roles were announced throughout 2021: Luna in April, Dandridge in May, Parker in June, Pierce, Bartlett, and Torv in July, and Offerman in December. This was followed by Reid in January 2022, Baker and Ashley Johnson in June, Lamar Johnson, Woodard, Greene, and Miles in August, Lynskey in September, Shepherd in December, and Wesley in January 2023.

Casting for the second season was put on hold in May 2023 due to the Writers Guild of America strike; actors had been auditioning with scenes from The Last of Us Part II due to an absence of scripts. Casting director Mary Vernieu approached Mazin and Druckmann with lists of actors for roles, including many with whom they were unfamiliar. Several roles were cast without auditions or tests; Mazin instead focused on actors fitting their individual roles and had "faith" that they would work with their co-stars. The second season's casting started with Abby. Dever, Mazino, and Merced's casting was announced in January 2024, followed by O'Hara's in February, Ramirez, Barer, Gabrielle, and Lord's in March, and Wright's in May. Ahlers, Burke, Lamanna, Pantoliano, Park, and Ubach's castings were announced in March 2025.

The series shifted to Abby's perspective in the second-season finale; the third season follows her story. Dever was aware of her larger third-season presence when she got the role for the second season. Ramirez departed the series in December 2025 due to scheduling conflicts; he was replaced by Jorge Lendeborg Jr. for the third season in February 2026, alongside DuVall's casting. In March 2026, Ritter and Wilson's casting was announced, alongside Barer, Gabrielle, and Lord's promotion to series regulars, followed by Mao and Kratter's casting later in the month, Li's in April, Sarsgaard's in June, and Alexander, Bailey, and Goodman's in September.

=== Writing ===
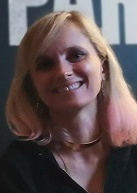
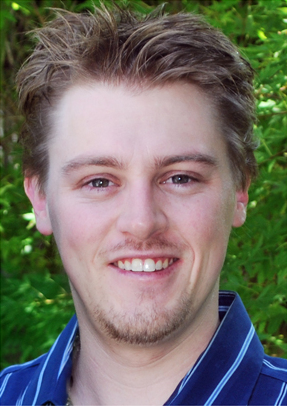
Halley Gross and Ryan James, who worked on the video games, joined the writers' room for the second and third seasons, respectively.

The Last of Us is a post-apocalyptic drama and thriller. Mazin wrote all first-season episodes except the seventh, written by Druckmann, and the two co-wrote the premiere and finale. A writers' room was established for the second season, with Mazin and Druckmann joined by Gross and Bo Shim, Mazin's first-season assistant; Mazin wrote the first five episodes and co-wrote the final two with Druckmann and Gross. The writers' room for the third season opened in late February 2025, joined by Ryan James, who worked on the games, and Alexandra Cheng, Mazin's second-season writing assistant. Mazin planned to return to writing after the second season aired. Druckmann, Gross, and Shim stepped away from the writers' room by July, and Mazin had started writing by August, set to take several months.

The writers avoided making "a zombie show", considering the infected a vessel through which characters are pressured to make decisions and reveal their true selves. Content cut from the games was added to the series. Mazin compared the process to adapting a novel, with identical emotional beats despite different events. Some action-heavy sequences were changed to focus on character drama at HBO's encouragement. The second season's additional characters granted a broader focus, allowing more action sequences, and Mazin expects more in the third. The second season explores themes of tribalism, and highlights themes of change and growth, demonstrated in characters, communities, and the infected. While the first season focuses on Joel and Ellie, and the second on Ellie and Dina, the third is set to follow Abby's story.

Druckmann wanted the adaptation to "keep the soul" from the games, particularly character relationships. He was open to changing aspects but wanted strong reasons, ensuring they considered impacts on later events. The game's outbreak takes place in 2013 with its post-apocalyptic narrative in 2033; this was changed to 2003 and 2023 as the writers felt events occurring simultaneously with broadcast was more interesting and did not fundamentally change the story. They added the outbreak's origins to ground the narrative, recognizing audiences are more knowledgeable about viral pandemics after COVID-19. The writers found the series an opportunity to delve into backstories of characters not explored in the games, wanting to better understand their motivations. In the first season, the writers replaced spores—the vector through which infection is spread in the games—with tendrils forming a unified network, inspired by the idea of mycelium; spores returned, in a limited extent, in the second season.

=== Filming ===
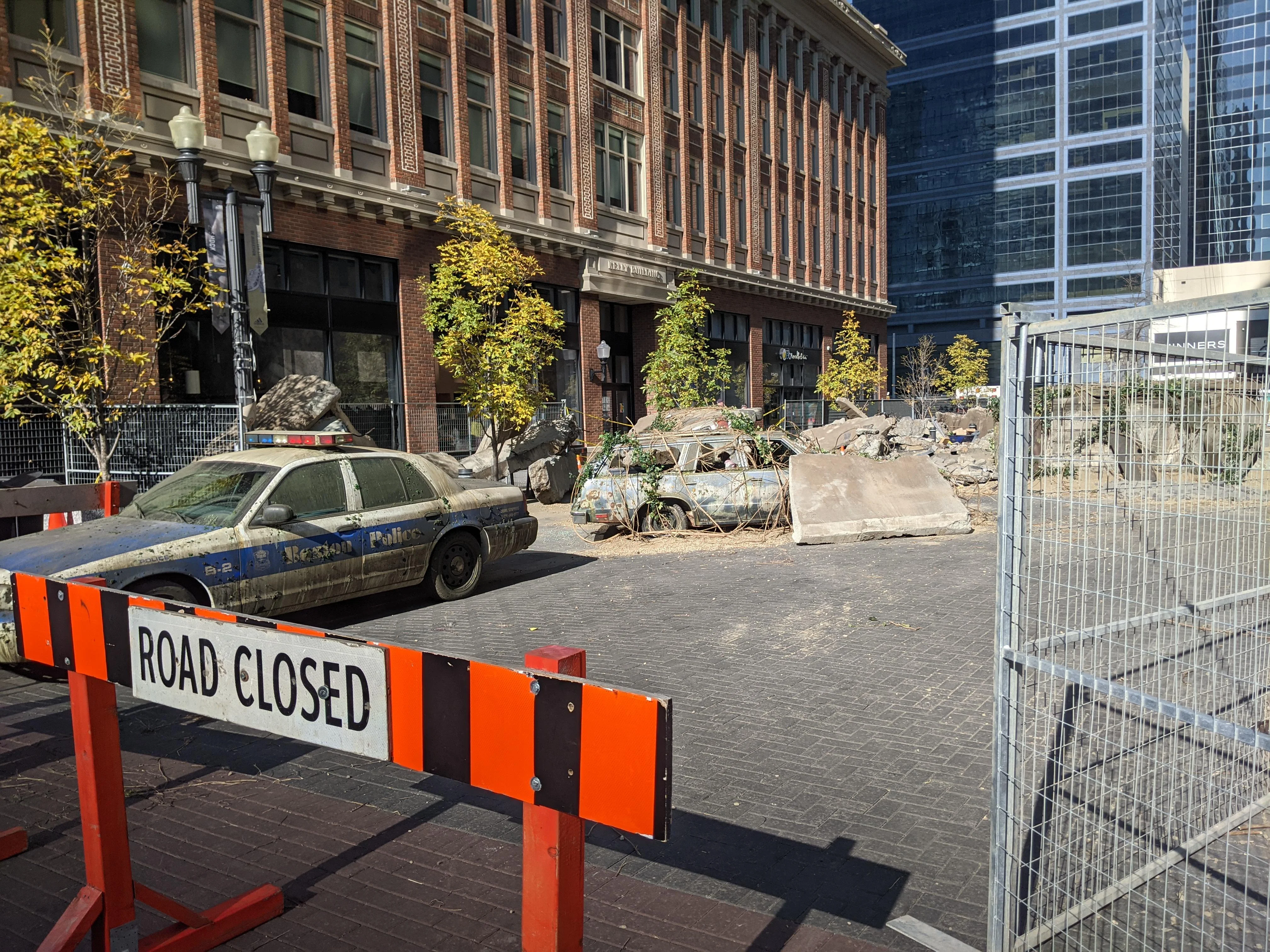
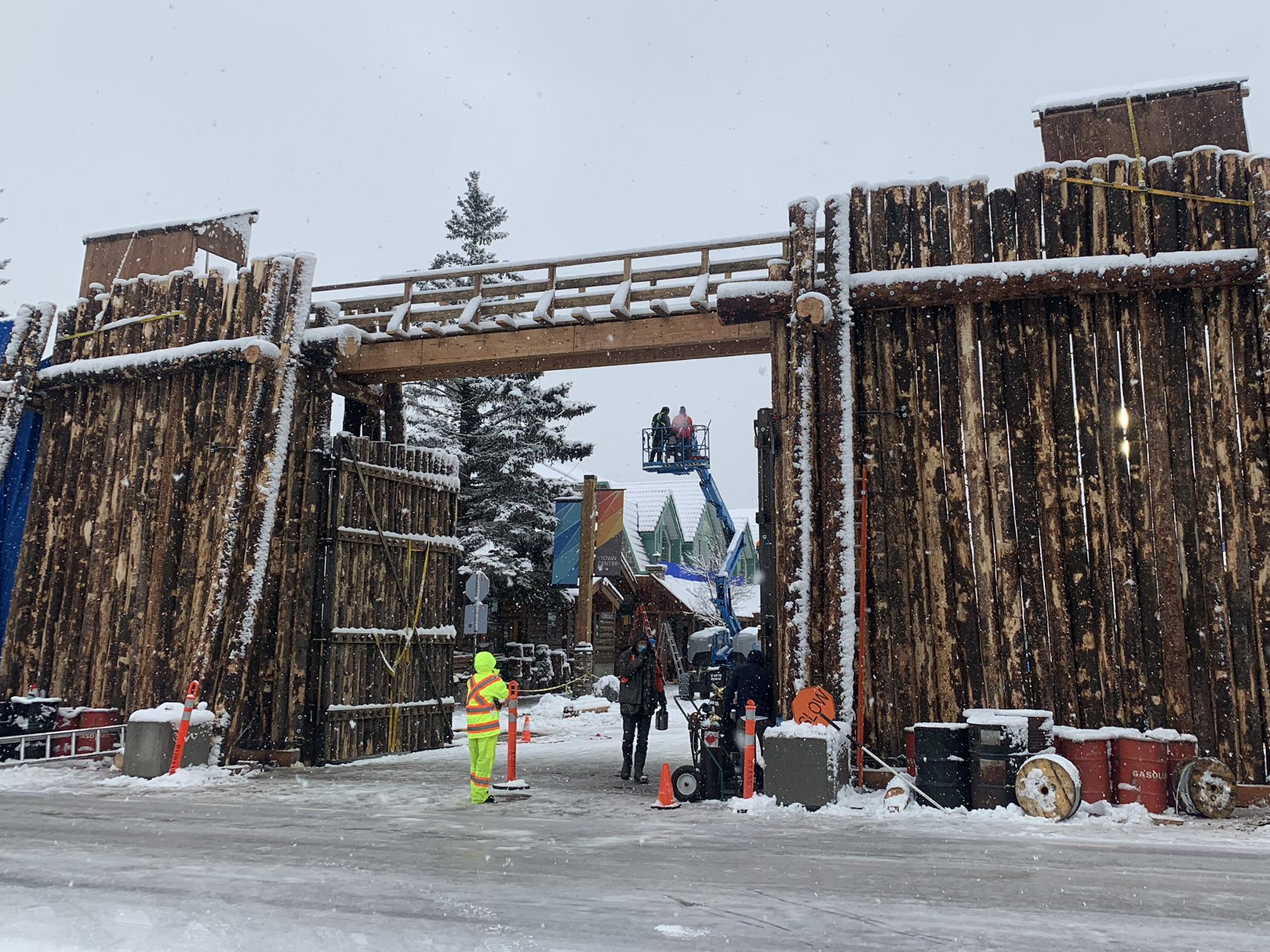
The first season was filmed in Alberta from July 2021 to June 2022.

Ksenia Sereda is the lead director of photography on the series. The first season filmed for 218 days, with around 18–19 days per episode. Filming began in Calgary, Alberta, on July 12, 2021, and moved to High River and Fort Macleod in July and Calgary in August. A four-day shoot in Downtown Edmonton in October cost CA$372,000. Filming moved to Calgary until November, then Canmore. Production took place in Okotoks and Waterton Lakes in February 2022, Calgary from March to May, Olds in May and June, and High River in June. It concluded on June 11, followed by additional photography in Kansas City in October.

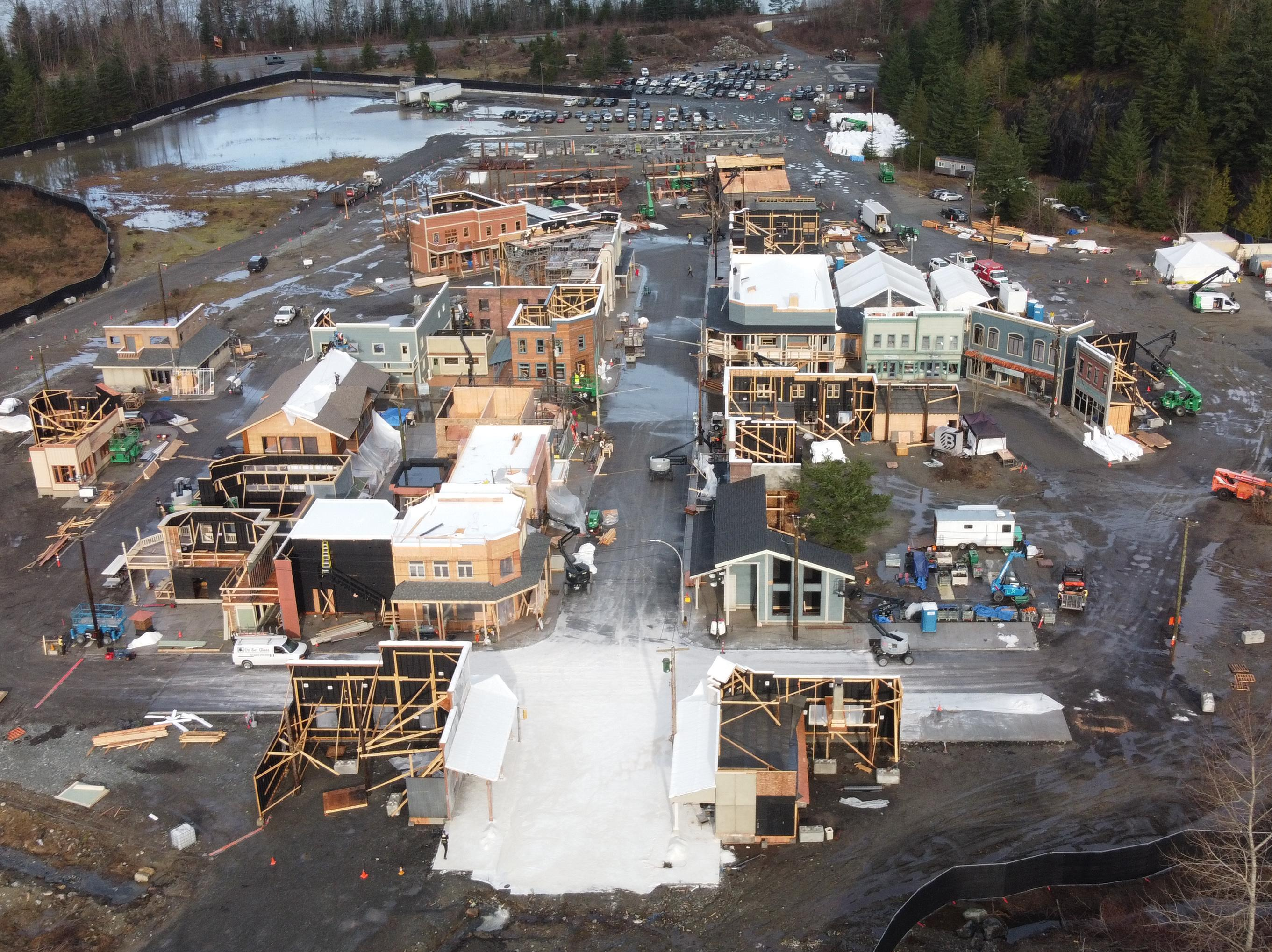
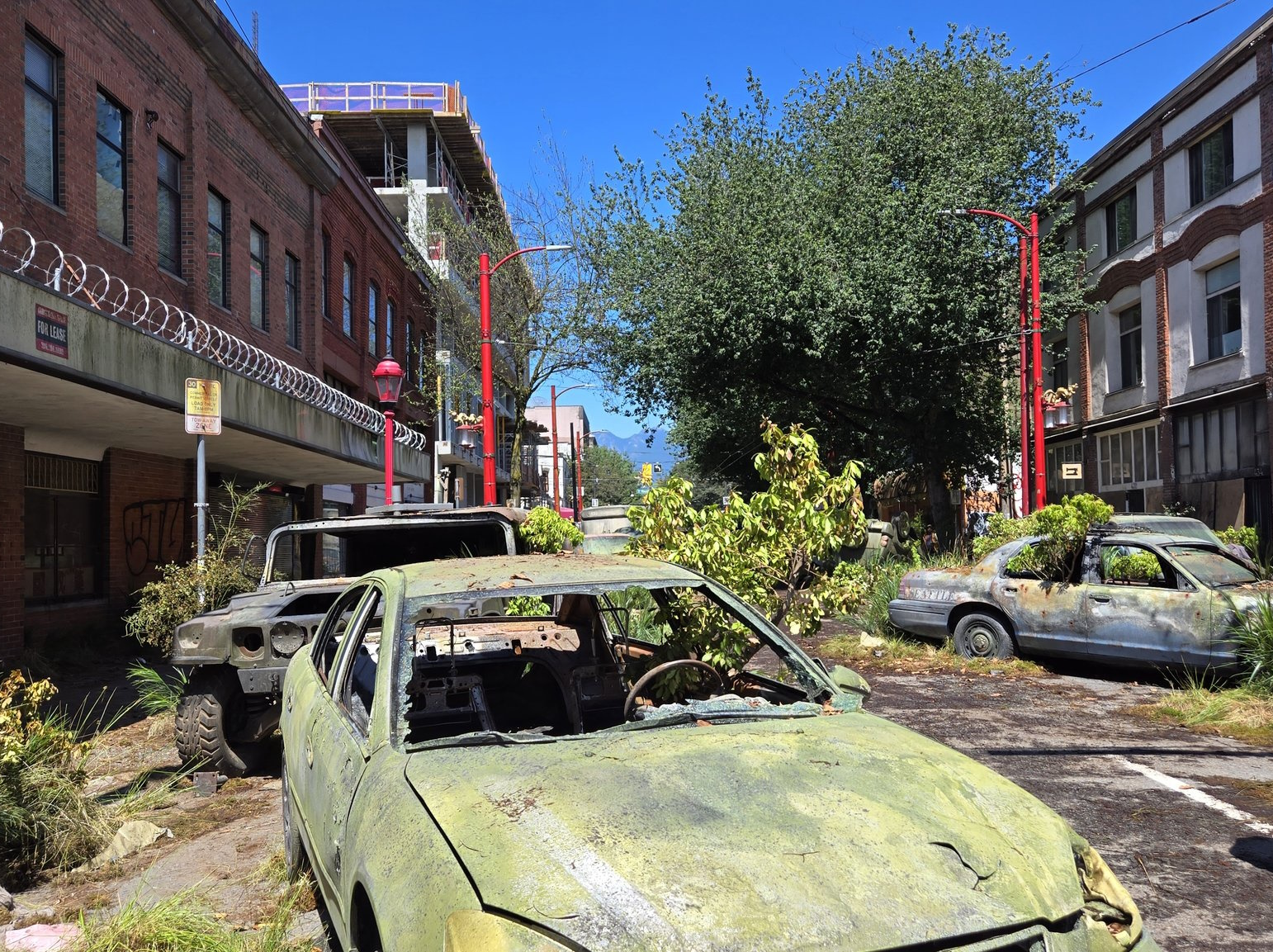
The second season was filmed primarily in British Columbia from February to August 2024.

The second season was filmed in British Columbia under the working title Mega Sword, using 60–70 locations. Delayed by the writers' and actors' strikes, production began on February 12, 2024, with filming in Kamloops, Mission, Fort Langley, and Langley. Production returned to Calgary in March, including in Exshaw and Highway 1A, and moved to Downtown Eastside and Nanaimo in May, Britannia Beach in June, Chinatown, Downtown Vancouver, and New Westminster in July, and Gastown in August. Production concluded on August 23, followed by additional photography in Downtown Vancouver in September 2024 and January 2025.

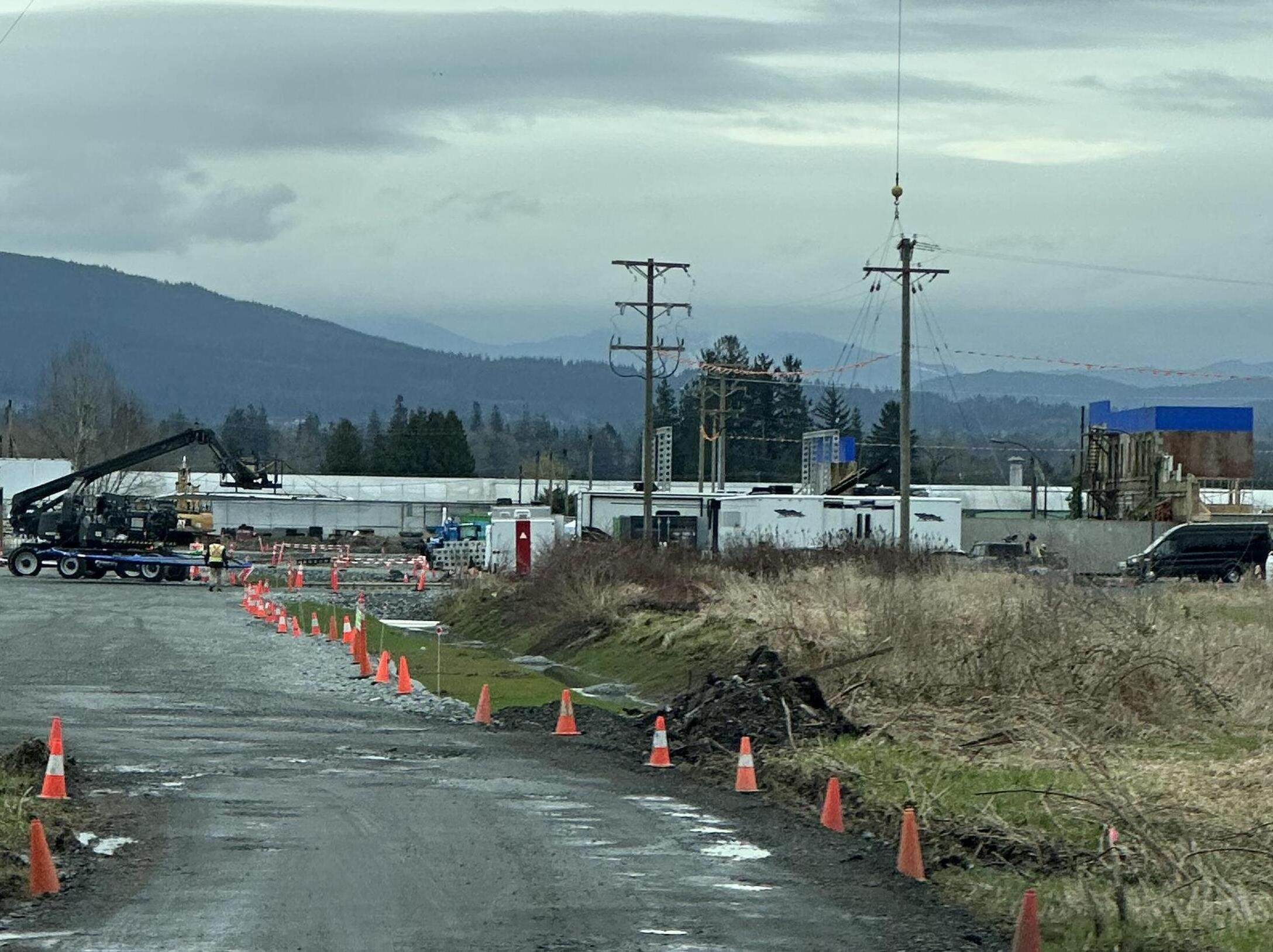
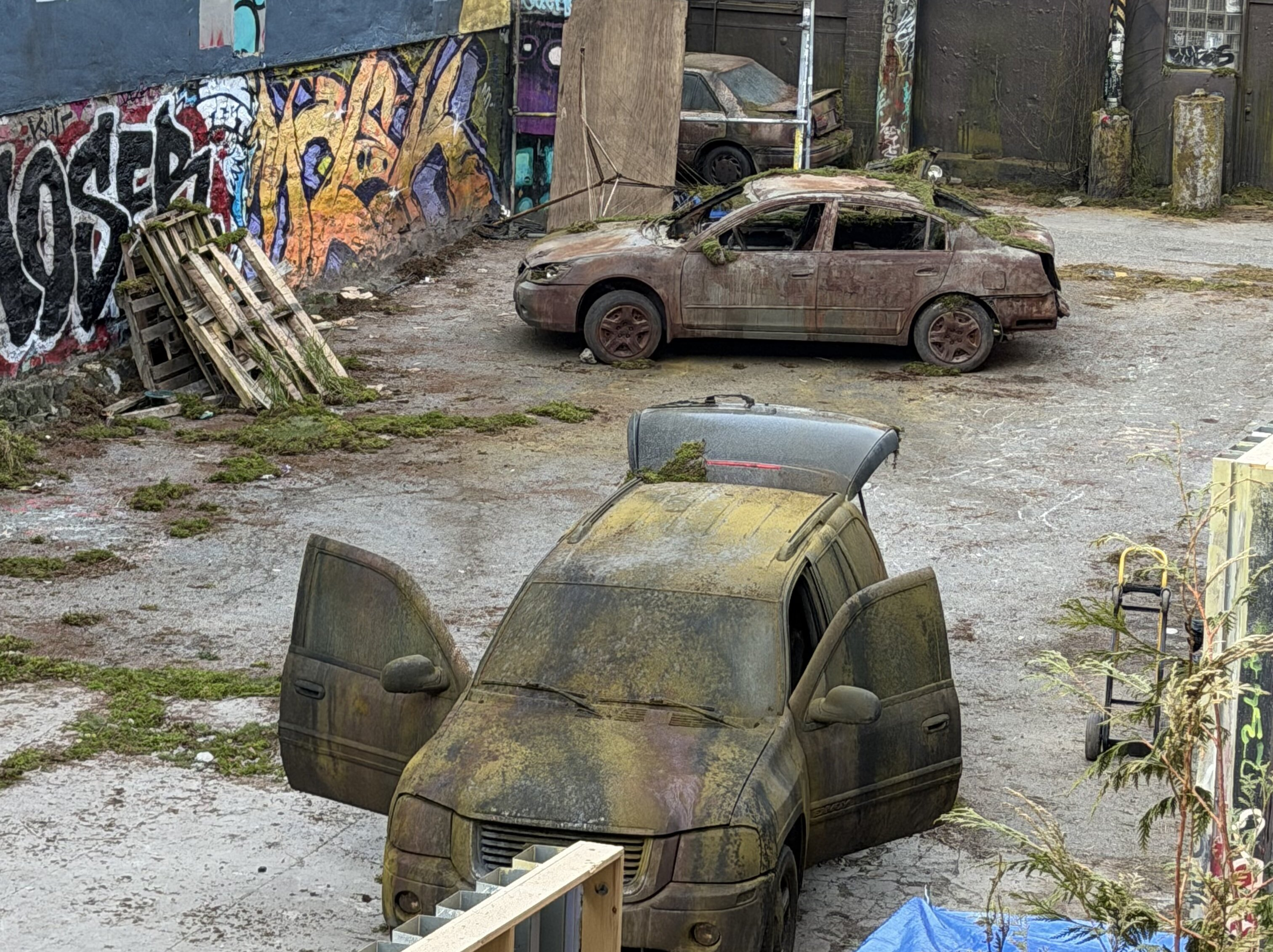
The third season began filming in Vancouver in March 2026.

Production for the third season began in British Columbia under the working title Calm Current on March 2, 2026. Filming took place in Gastown from March to April, in New Westminster and inside the former Hudson's Bay department store in April, and near the Royal Centre in May. Following a seven-week hiatus from June 1, filming took place at BC Place, Vancouver, Maple Ridge, and Gastown in August, followed by Whytecliff Beach in October. Filming is set to take an eight-week hiatus from November 18 before a final five weeks of production from January 18 to February 22, 2027.

=== Music ===
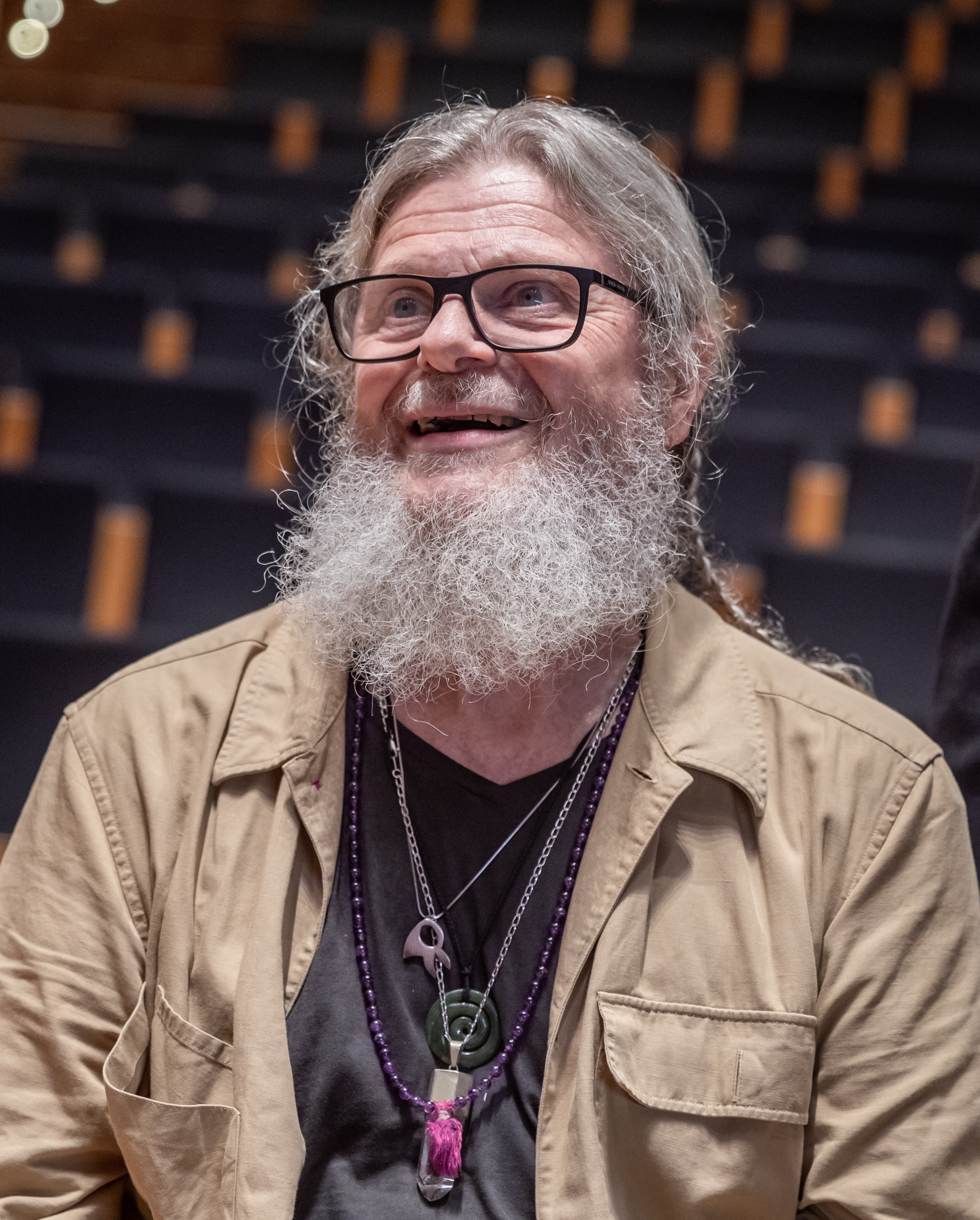
Gustavo Santaolalla, who worked on the video games, co-composed the score for the television series.

Gustavo Santaolalla and David Fleming composed the score for the television series; Santaolalla, who worked on the video games, wrote its opening theme. Mazin and Druckmann considered his score part of the franchise's "DNA". Santaolalla treated the series as "an expansion" of the games and kept them tied to each other, not seeking to revise or correct previous work as he considered it authentic. He worked on the character-driven score and Fleming on the action-driven, and they collaborated on blending the two. To match Santaolalla's work, Fleming kept his score minimalistic and selected instruments that paired appropriately. Soundtrack albums were released for each season.

Druckmann considered music conducive to the narrative, with characters performing or listening to music contributing to worldbuilding or relationships. Several episode titles are based on songs: "Long, Long Time" features the song by Linda Ronstadt, which exhibits themes of unfulfilled love and how time heals wounds, echoing Bill and Frank's relationship; "Please Hold to My Hand" references the lyrics of Hank Williams's "Alone and Forsaken"; "Future Days" is named after the song by Pearl Jam, which features in the games and series; and "Through the Valley" is named after Shawn James's song, of which a cover by Ashley Johnson is featured in the episode. Several songs saw stream increases following their use in the series, and many subsequently charted.

=== Design and post-production ===
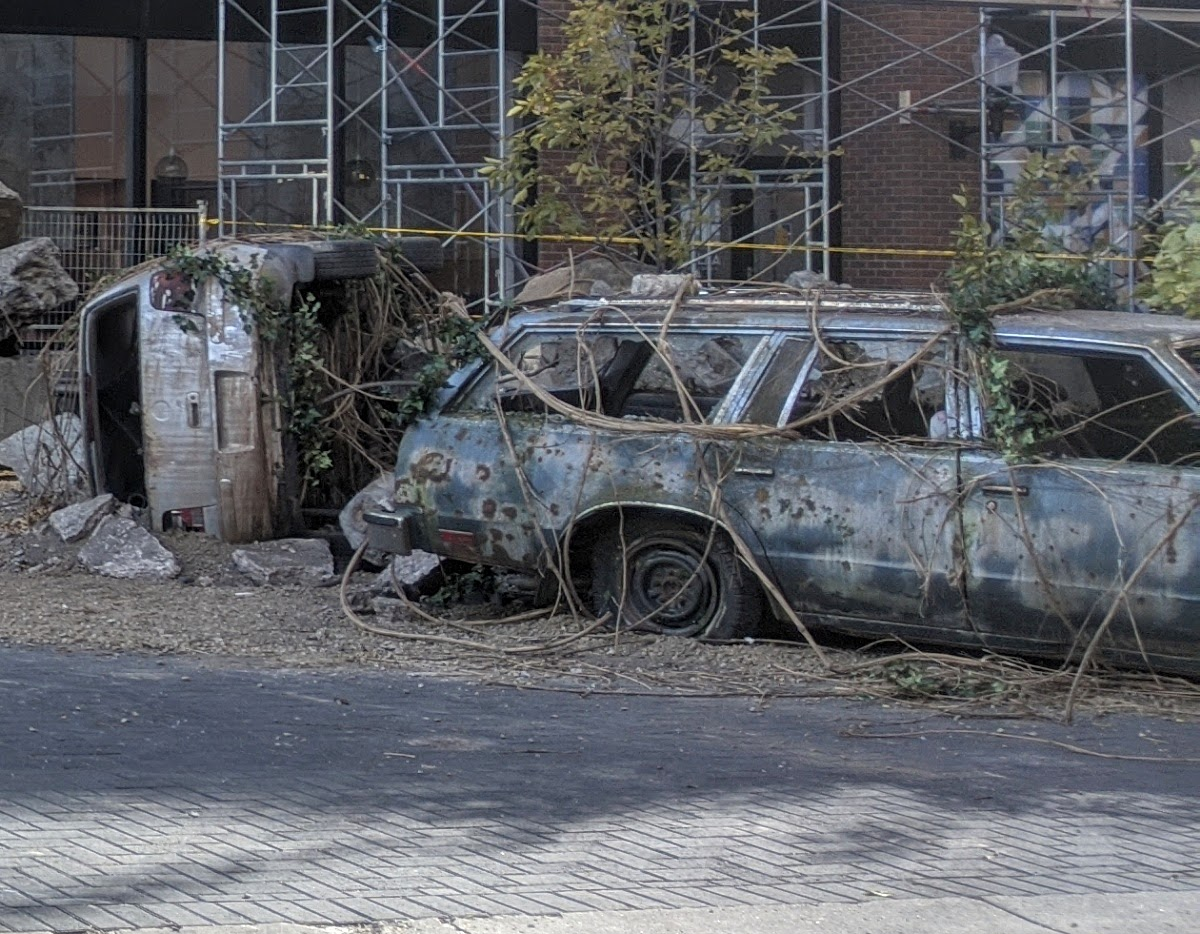
Edmonton, August 2021

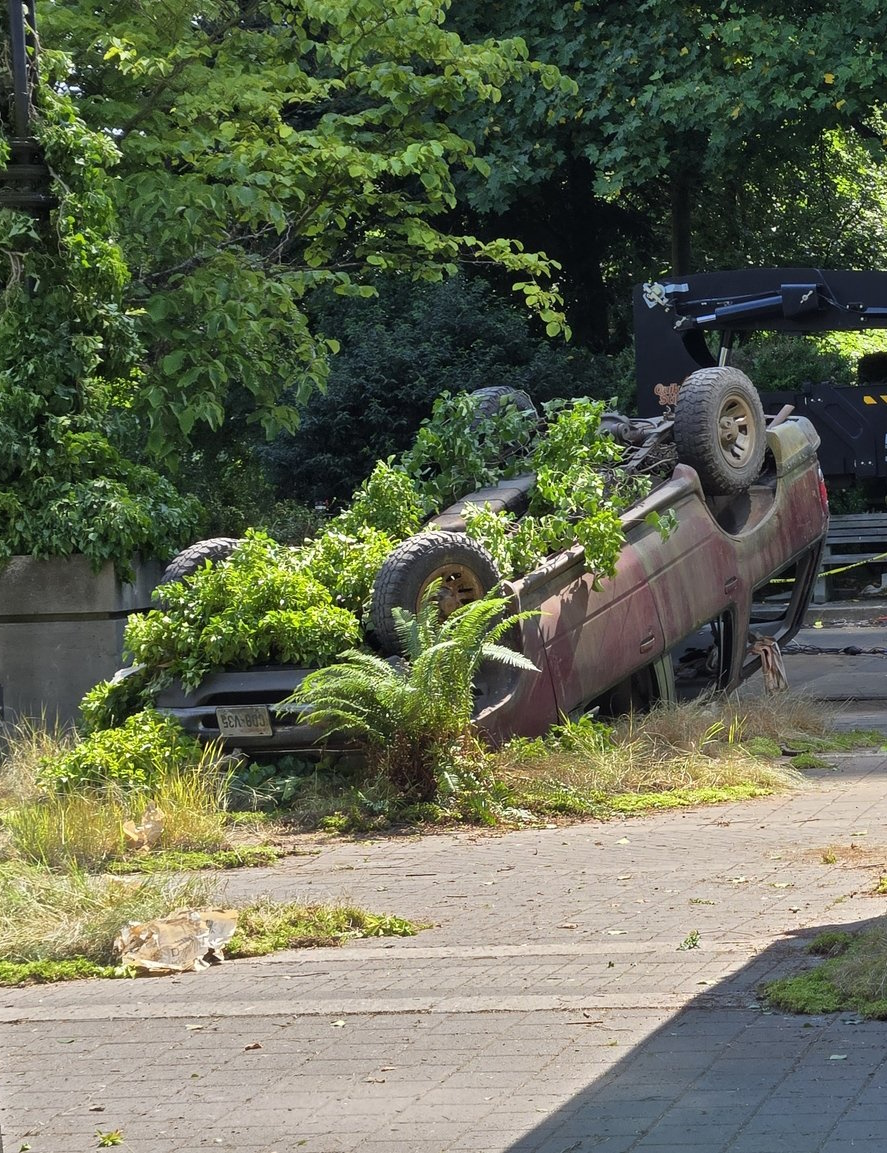
Vancouver, August 2024

Several teams worked on the series's set design to make the world look appropriately aged and damaged.

Five art directors and hundreds of technicians worked on the first season, and the game's artists provided feedback on costumes and sets. Production designer John Paino referenced the game but focused on Naughty Dog's own references. He created an image collage which included a photograph of reassembled chairs, which Mazin considered the show's mandate: "the built world is unbuilt and rebuilt". Art director Don Macaulay replaced Paino for the second season. Costume designer Cynthia Ann Summers found the series more difficult than fantasy or period pieces as the costumes had to be integral to the story without standing out; Ann Foley, who replaced Summers on the second and third seasons, agreed, working directly with the actors for input and feedback.

Barrie and Sarah Gower, with whom Mazin had worked on Chernobyl, created the prosthetics for the infected. Mazin wanted the clickers to resemble the in-game design through prosthetics; he felt using visual effects would have lessened their impact. Choreographer Terry Notary wanted the creatures' movements to imitate each other, akin to schools of fish. Misty Lee and Phillip Kovats, who had worked on the games, (Note: In addition to providing clicker noises, Phillip Kovats was the audio director of the first game.) returned to voice the clickers for the series.

Timothy A. Good is the series's lead editor, working alongside Emily Mendez, who was his assistant editor before becoming his co-editor for the first season and an editor for the second. Mark Hartzell and Cindy Mollo each edited a first-season episode, and Simon Smith edited two in the second season. Sixteen visual effects teams worked on the series, supervised by Alex Wang. The first season had over 3,000 visual effects shots; most episodes had around 250. The 650-person team at DNEG worked on 535 shots for the season over 18 months, primarily focusing on environmental effects; field trips were conducted to gather resources, and the team regularly referenced the video games. The visual effects teams consulted with Naughty Dog's concept artists when creating the infected, and used timelapse videos of Cordyceps growth as animation references. Design studio Elastic created the title sequence to demonstrate the "unrelenting nature" of the fungus.

== Release ==
=== Broadcast and home media ===
The first season premiered in the United States on January 15, 2023. It was broadcast on HBO in the United States, and is available to stream in 4K resolution on HBO Max. The first episode received its red carpet world premiere in Westwood, Los Angeles, on January 9, followed by theater screenings in Budapest and Sydney on January 11, and New York City on January 12. Behind-the-scenes videos, titled Inside the Episode, were released on HBO Max and YouTube following each episode, and Naughty Dog released Building The Last of Us, featuring interviews with the cast and crew of the series and games. The first season was released digitally and on DVD, Blu-ray, and Ultra HD Blu-ray in the United Kingdom on July 17, and in the United States on July 18, containing behind-the-scenes featurettes including a short film about adapting the game, a conversation with microbiology and parasitology experts, and the Inside the Episode series.

The Last of Us is HBO's first original content to have an American Sign Language version, performed by Daniel Durant and directed by Leila Hanaumi; the first season was released on Max on March 31, 2025, and the second season was released alongside each new episode, which premiered on April 13. The first episode of the second season received its red carpet premiere in Hollywood, Los Angeles, on March 24, followed by red carpet and theater screenings in Sydney on April 2, Paris on April 5, and London on April 10. The season was released for digital purchase in May alongside the ASL versions, including as a bundle with the first season, and was released on DVD, Blu-ray, and Ultra HD Blu-ray in the United Kingdom on September 15, and in the United States on September 23, containing featurettes including set tours, a Q&A with Pascal and Ramsey, and the behind-the-scenes series Making of The Last of Us.

The third season is expected to air in 2027.

=== Promotion ===
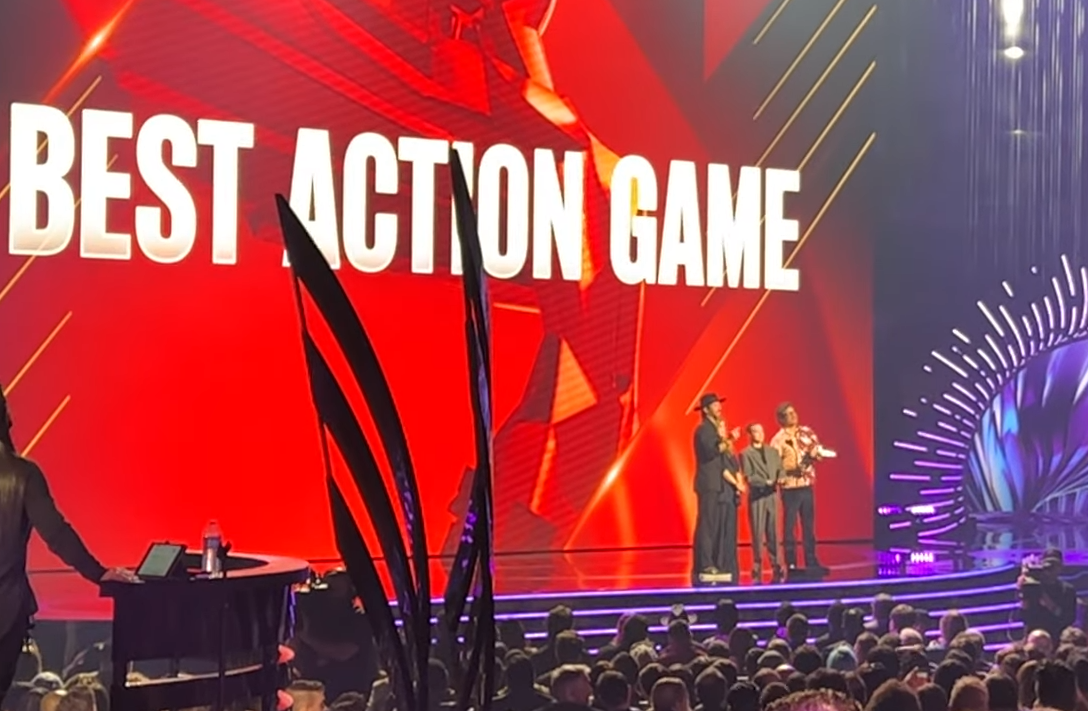
To promote the show, Troy Baker, Ashley Johnson, Bella Ramsey, and Pedro Pascal presented Best Action Game at the Game Awards in December 2022.

The Last of Us's marketing campaign utilised "breadcrumb content": small teases to maintain engagement. Emily Giannusa, HBO vice president of marketing, planned promotional material to prove faithfulness to the source but found it unnecessary as fans created it themselves. The marketing team conducted social listening from 2020 to identify non-gaming influencers interested in the series. HBO shared the first image of Pascal and Ramsey in costume in September 2021, followed by the first footage in a HBO Max trailer during the premiere of House of the Dragon in August 2022. The first teaser trailer was released in September, receiving over 17 million views in less than 24 hours and over 57 million organic views in 72 hours, the most-watched promotional video in HBO's history.

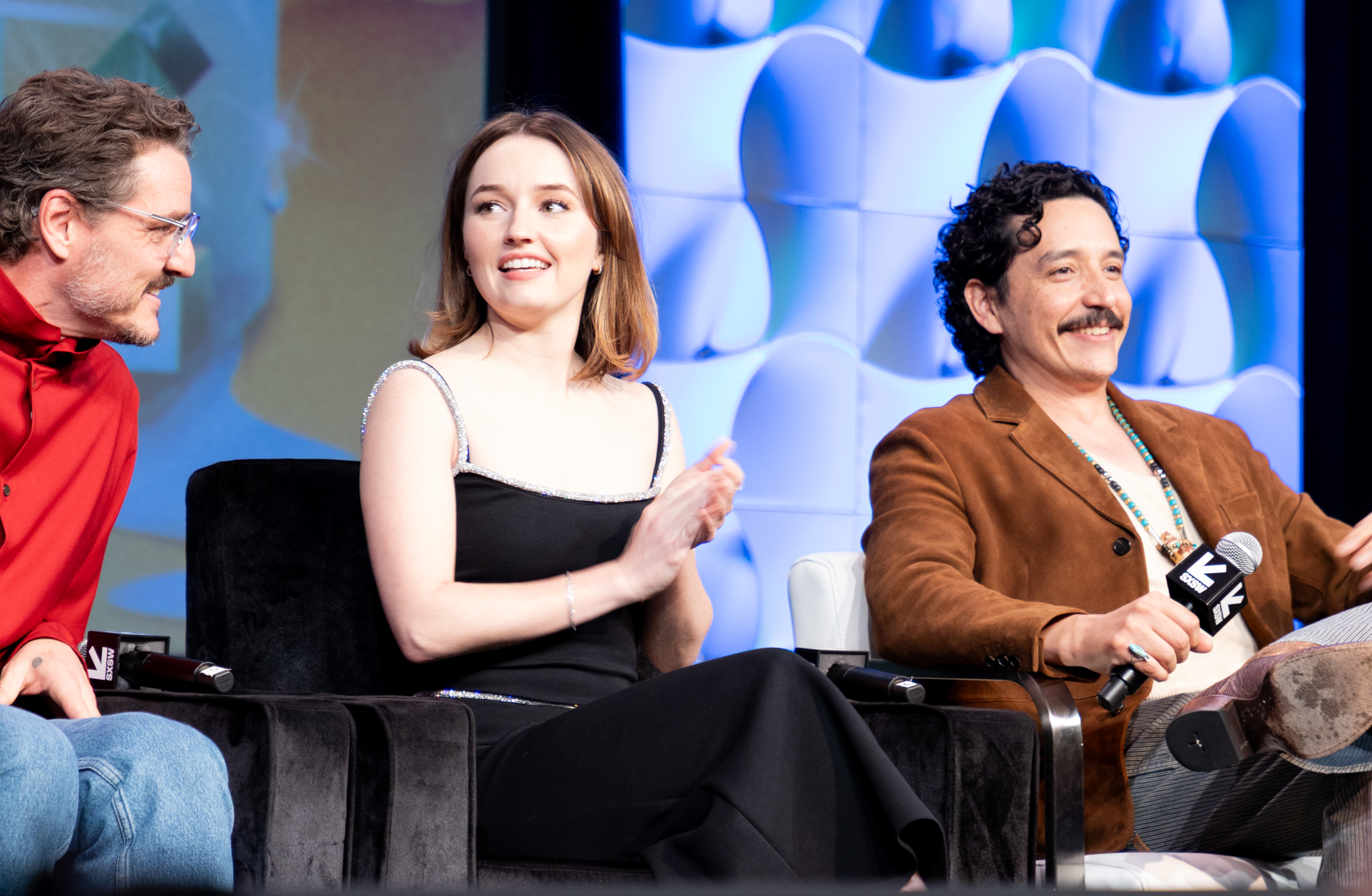
Pedro Pascal, Kaitlyn Dever, and Gabriel Luna promoting the second season at SXSW

The first full trailer was released at CCXP in December, when the promotional campaign "kick[ed] into high gear". Pascal, Ramsey, Baker, and Ashley Johnson presented at the Game Awards 2022 on December 8. A season trailer was released after the airing of the first episode on January 15. Pascal, Ramsey, Bartlett, and Offerman appeared on several talk shows to promote the series, and Pascal and Ramsey appeared on magazine covers. On January 27, the first episode was released for free on HBO Max in the United States, and on Sky's YouTube channel in the United Kingdom. Baker hosts a companion podcast alongside the series, featuring Mazin and Druckmann.

For the second season, Sony Pictures Consumer Products partnered with several brands to match the narrative's themes and content. HBO shared images of Pascal and Ramsey in May 2024, the first footage in August, and the first trailer and posters in September. A trailer was released at Sony's Consumer Electronics Show presentation in January 2025, followed by character posters for Abby, Ellie, and Joel in February, and a full trailer at SXSW in March, receiving the most 72-hour views of any HBO and Max original trailer with 158 million views, a 160% increase from previous marketing. The worldwide press tour—including London, Los Angeles, Paris, and Sydney—ran from March 24 to April 13. Pascal, Ramsey, Mazino, Merced, and Dever appeared on talk shows and Ramsey and Merced on magazine covers.

== Reception ==
=== Critical response ===
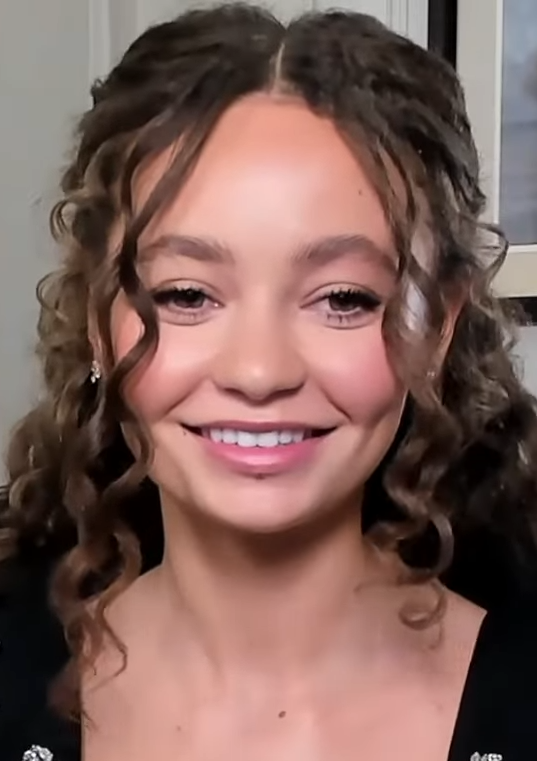
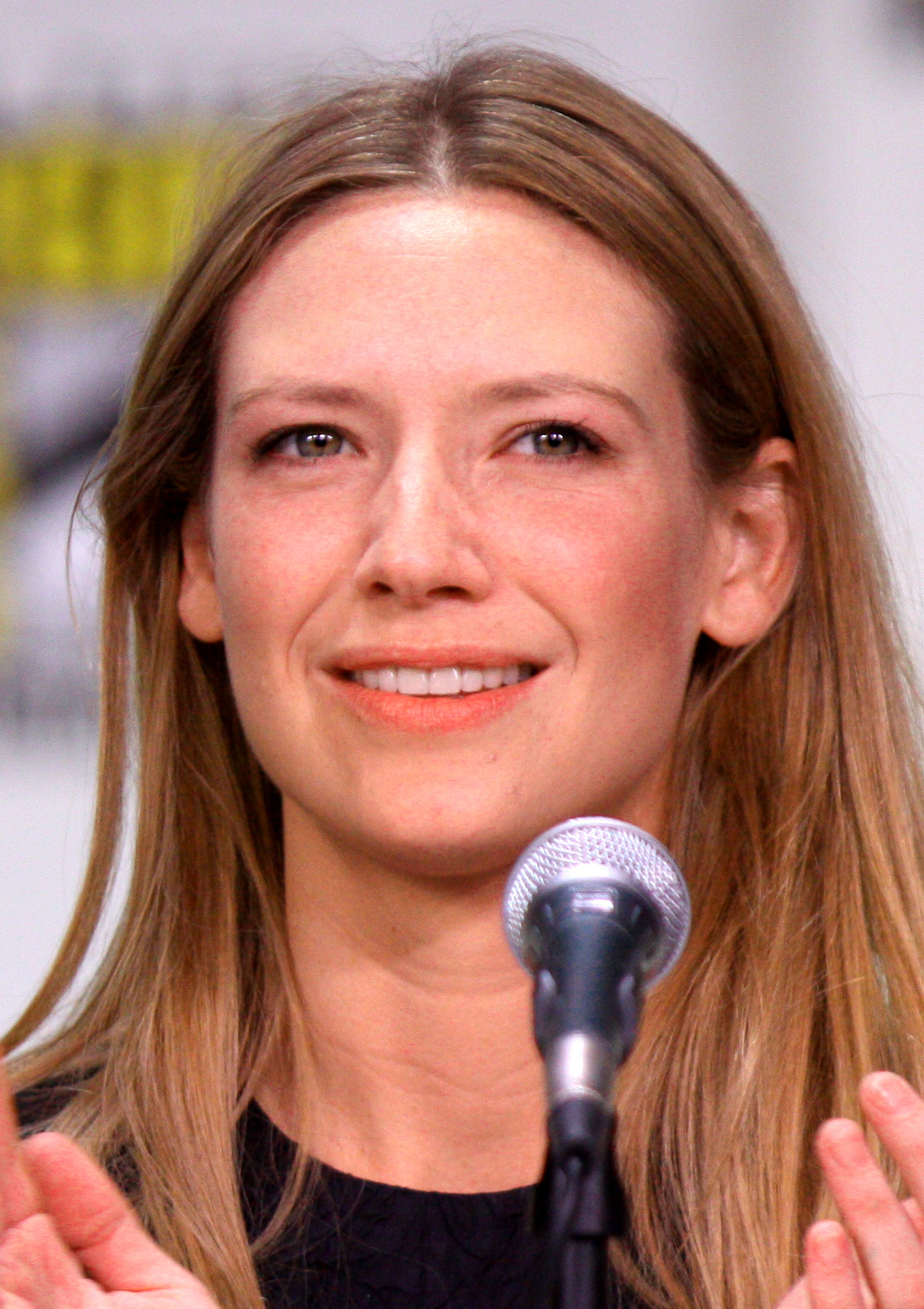
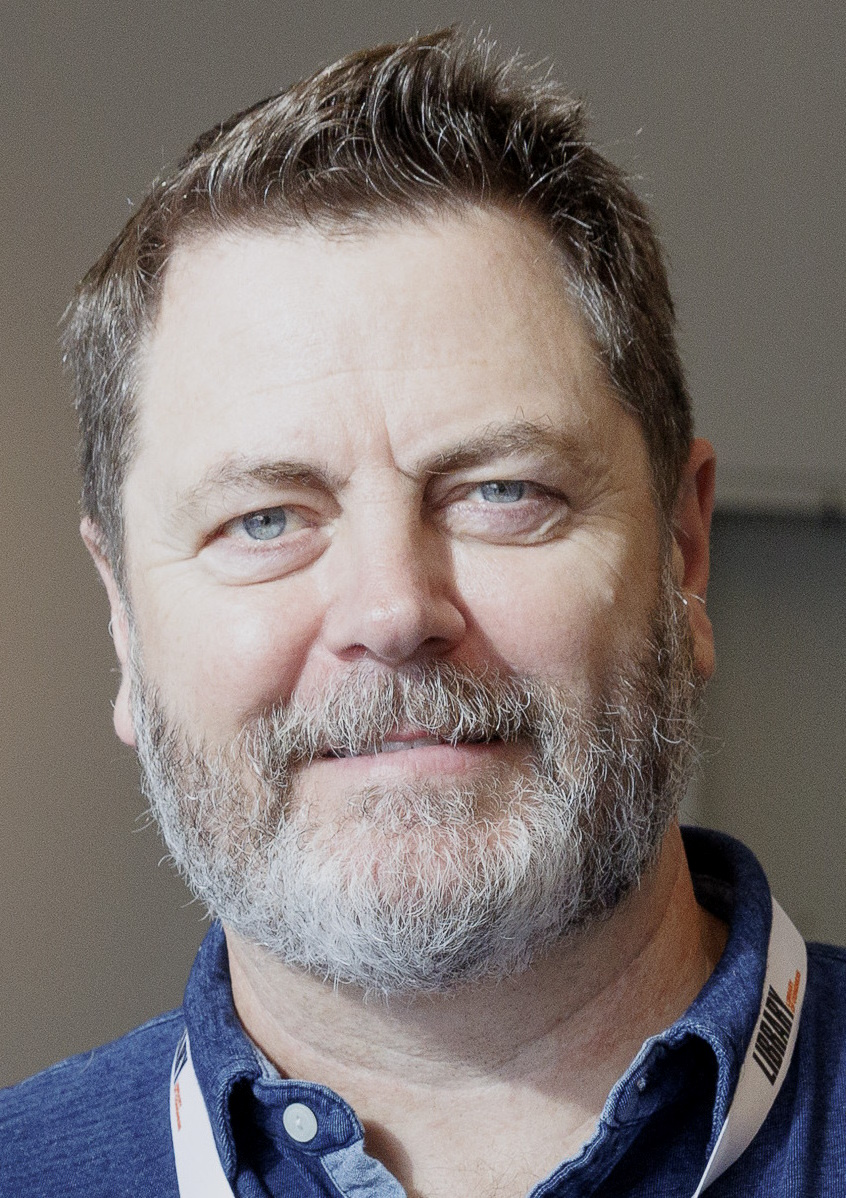
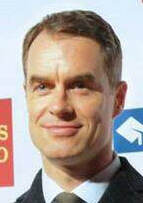
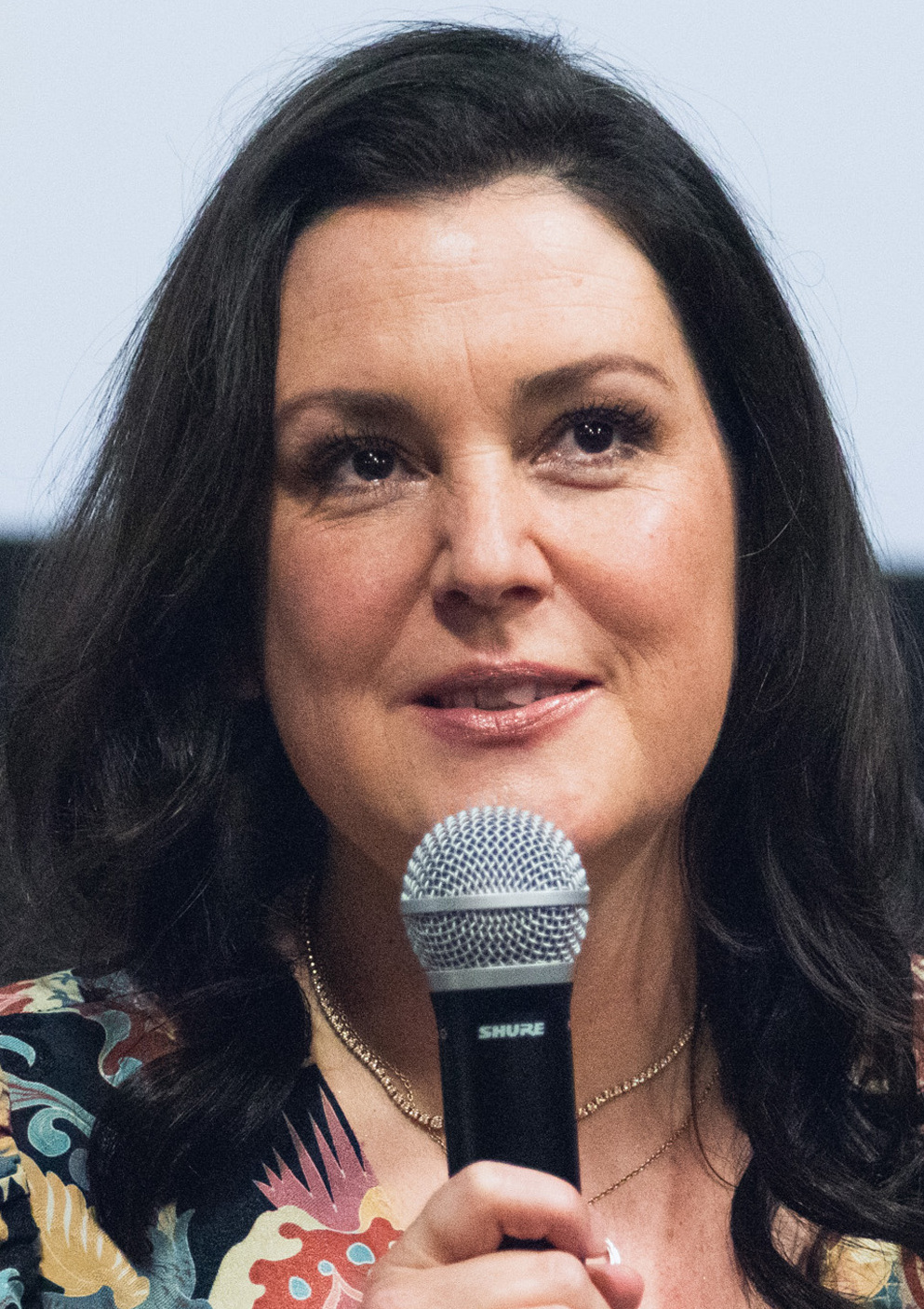
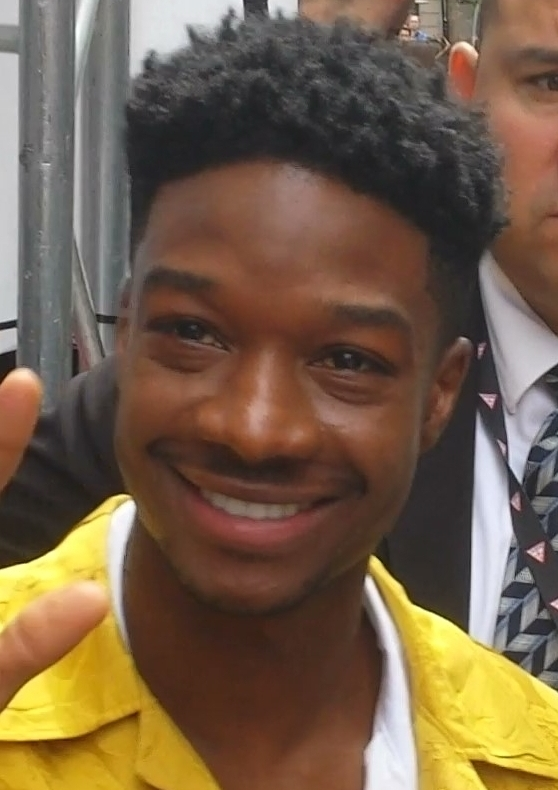
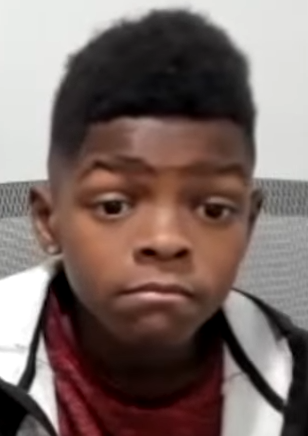
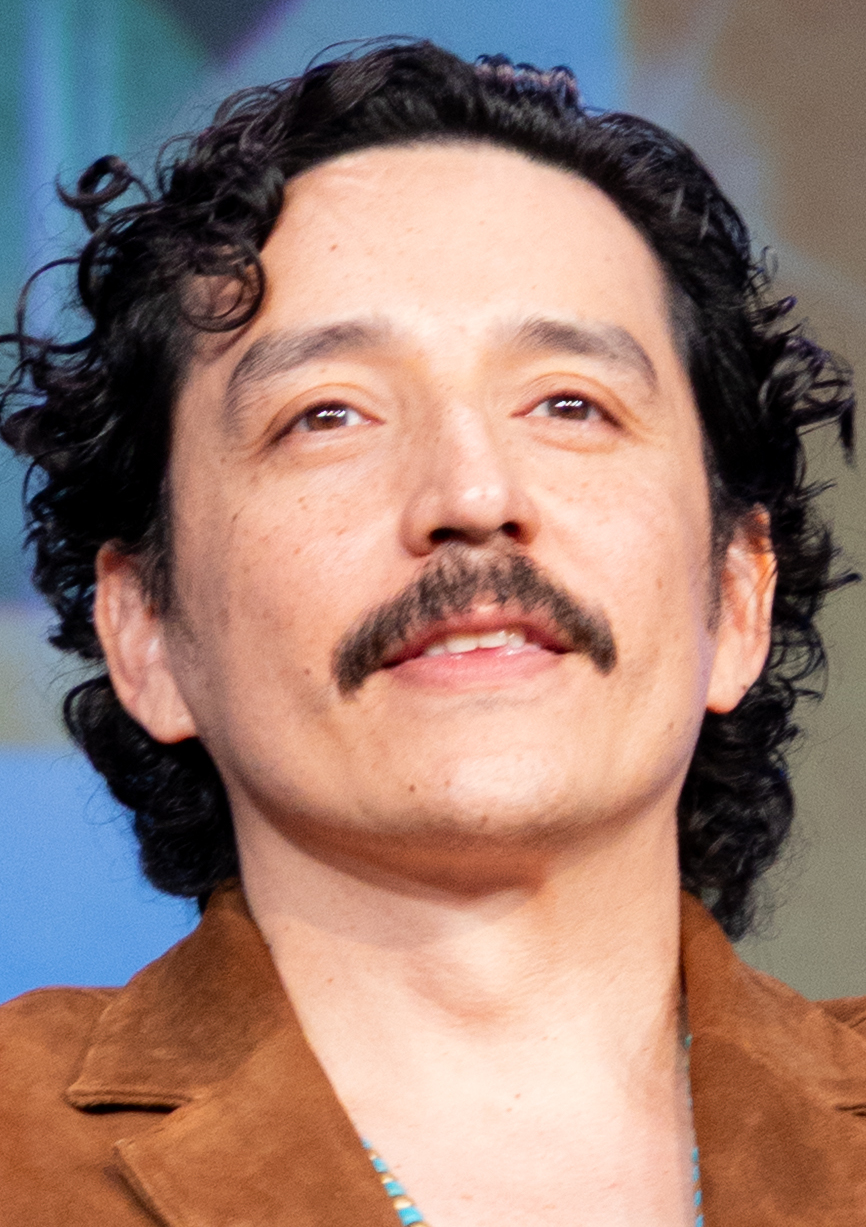
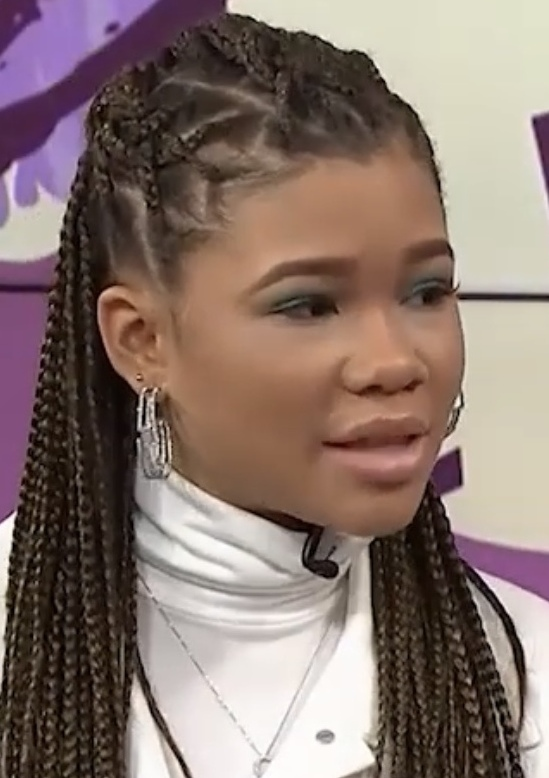
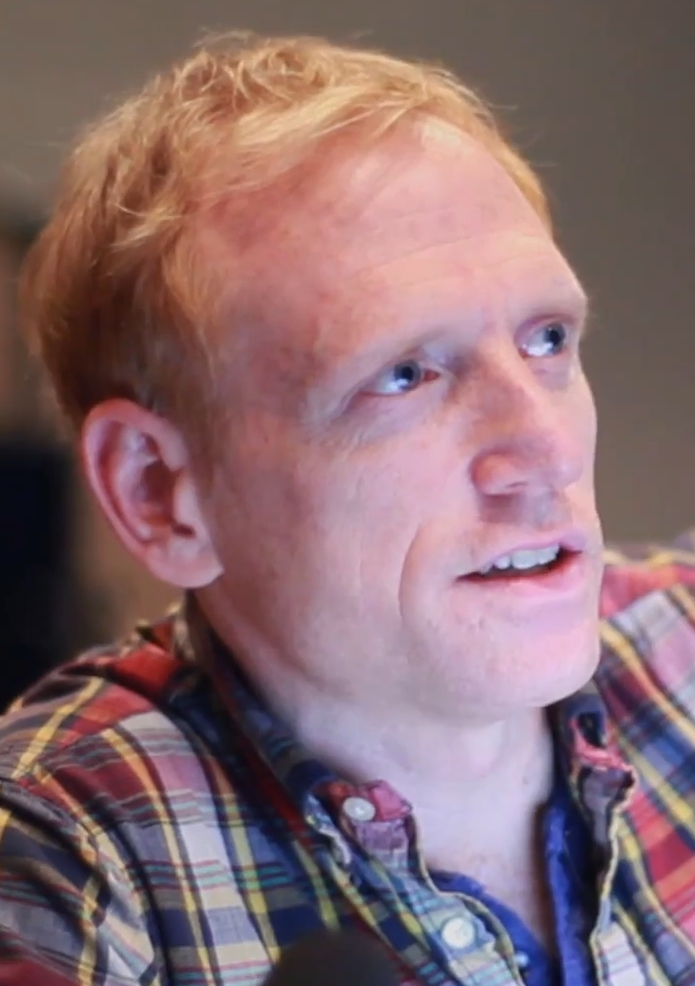
Critics praised the first-season guest performances of Nico Parker, Anna Torv, Nick Offerman, Murray Bartlett, Melanie Lynskey (top), Lamar Johnson, Keivonn Montreal Woodard, Gabriel Luna, Storm Reid, and Scott Shepherd (bottom). (Note: Attributed to multiple references, per guest actor: Nico Parker; Anna Torv; Nick Offerman and Murray Bartlett; Melanie Lynskey; Lamar Johnson and Keivonn Montreal Woodard; Gabriel Luna; Storm Reid; Scott Shepherd)

The Last of Us has an average approval rating of 94% on review aggregator Rotten Tomatoes and a weighted average score of 83/100 on Metacritic, indicating "universal acclaim". The first season has a 96% approval on Rotten Tomatoes based on 488 reviews, with an average rating of 8.7/10, and a Metacritic score of 84 based on 44 reviews. Several reviewers considered it the best adaptation of a video game; GameSpot's Mark Delaney called it "the beginning of a new era" for the genre. Reviewers praised the differences from the game's narrative, and some believed the scenes lifted directly were among the weakest and led to pacing issues. Critics overwhelmingly considered the third episode the season's best, and some named it among the greatest television episodes in recent years; The Hollywood Reporter's Daniel Fienberg felt it elevated the series to a new level, and Empire's John Nugent called it "one of the finest hours of television in recent memory". The production design was lauded for matching the game.

The cast's performances in the first season received widespread acclaim, with critics singling out Pascal and Ramsey's chemistry. Some considered Pascal's performance his career-best, citing his ability to portray nuance and rare vulnerability, and several found Ramsey gave the show's breakout performance for their balance of comedy and emotion. Guest performances were highly praised, including Parker for her likeability, Torv for being sophisticated and heartbreaking, and Lynskey for juxtaposing humanity and viciousness. Critics enjoyed the chemistry between Pascal and Luna, and Ramsey and Reid. Offerman and Bartlett's performances were described by Complex's William Goodman as "career-best". IGN's Simon Cardy lauded Lamar Johnson's emotional performance in his final scene, and Total Film's Bradley Russell felt the naivety of Woodard's role intensified the narrative. The A.V. Club's David Cote called Shepherd's performance "masterful in its wry, understated charm".

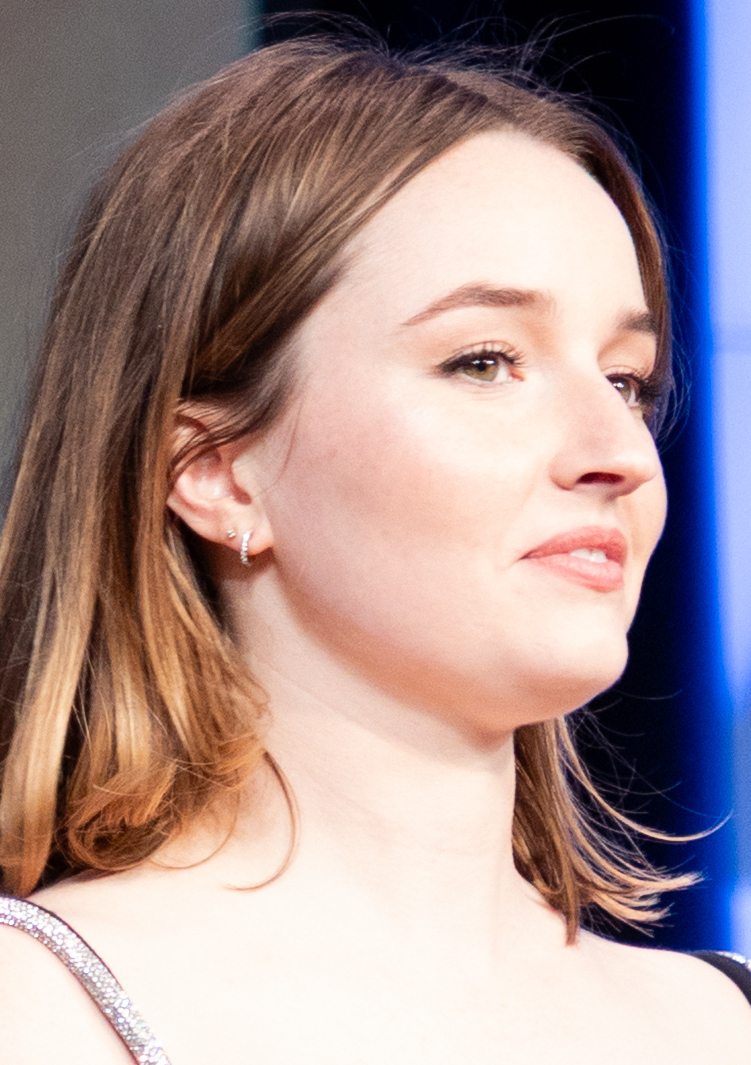
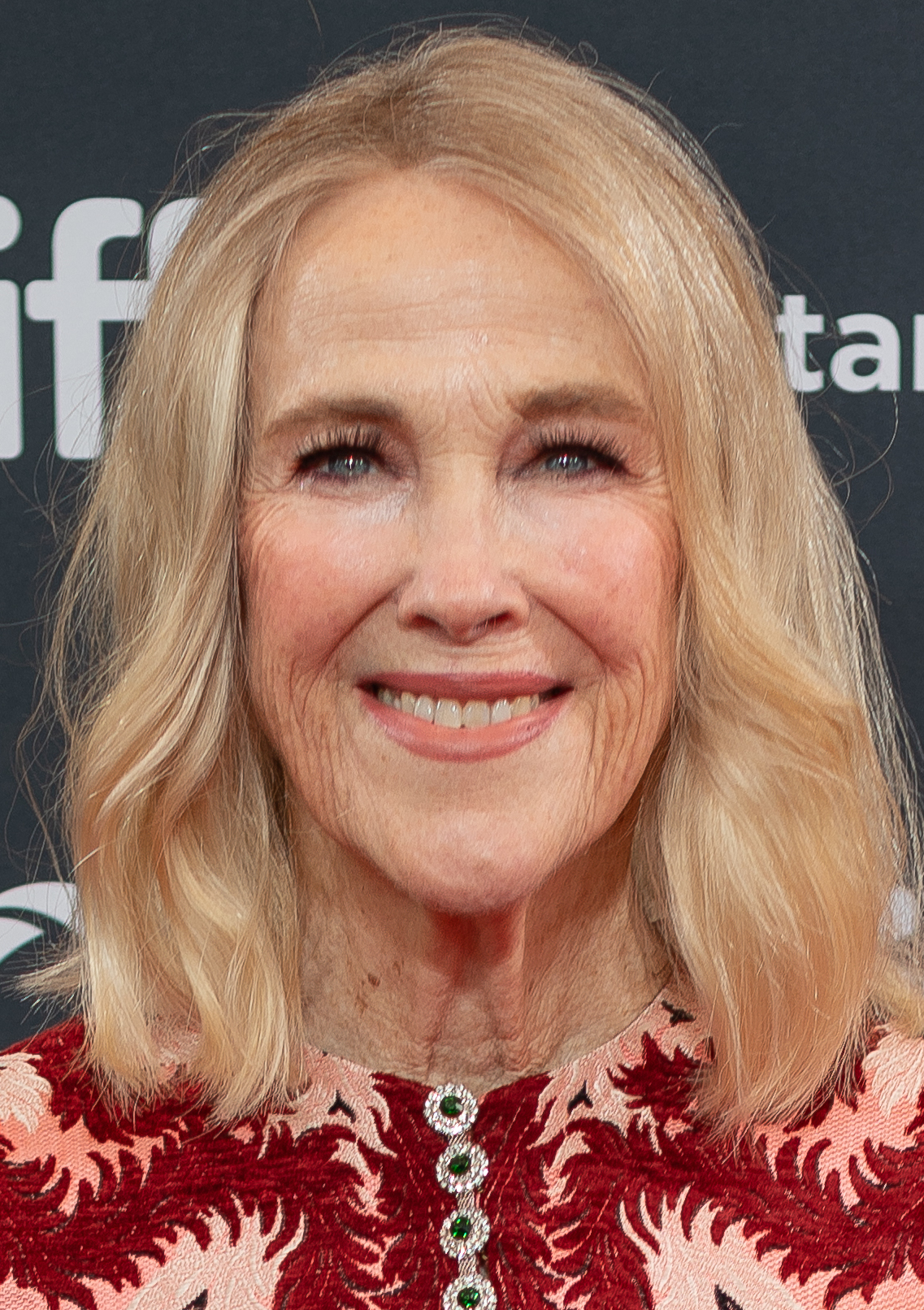
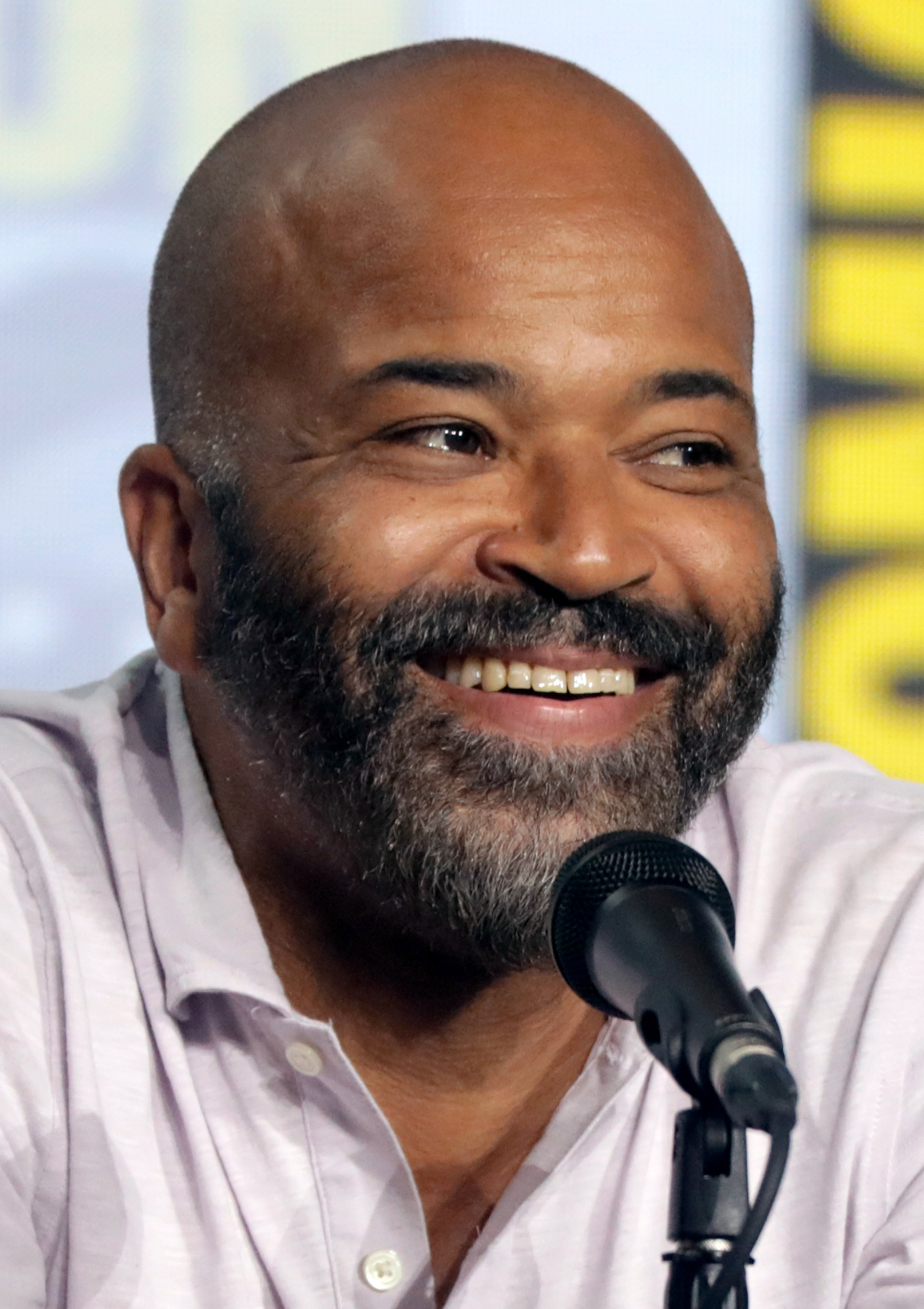
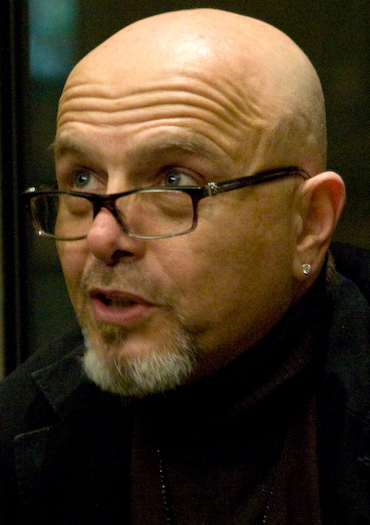
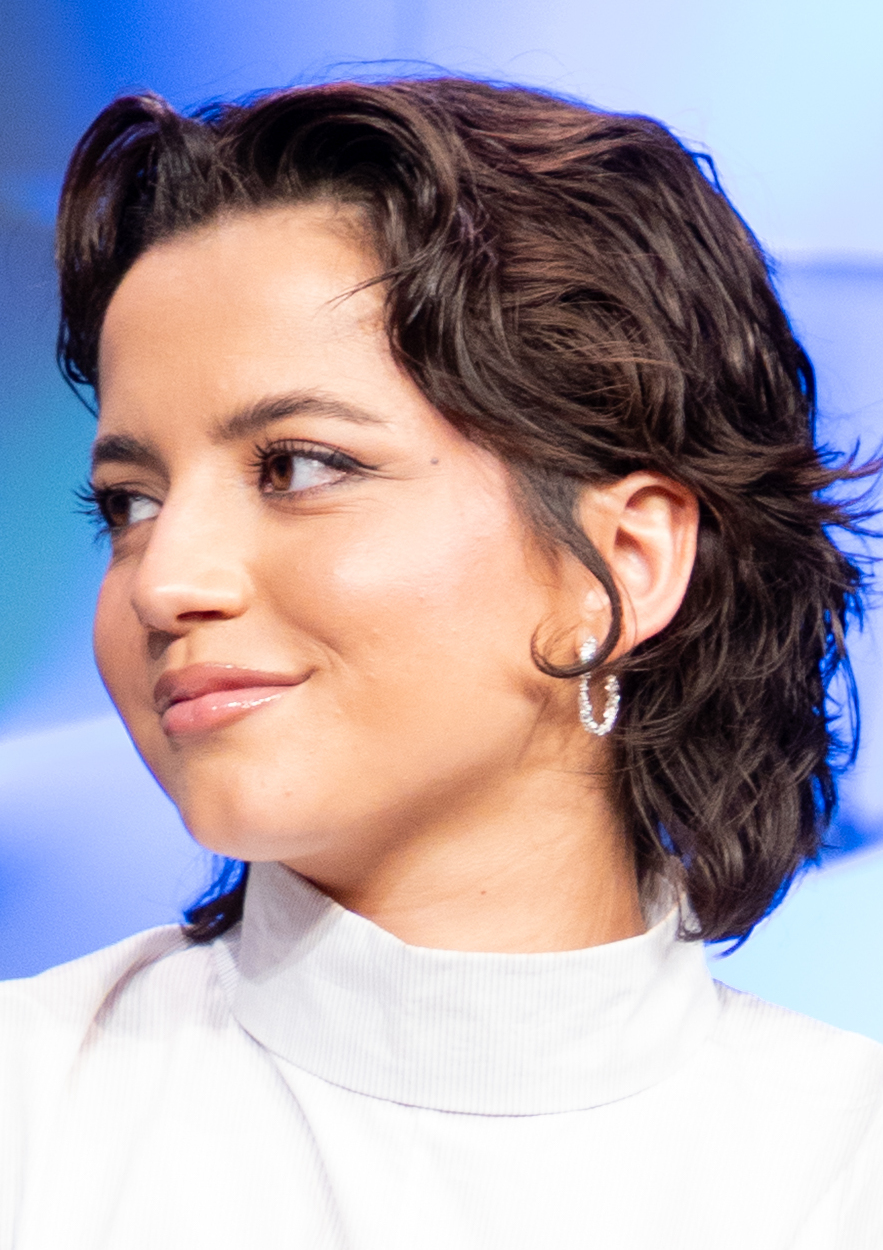
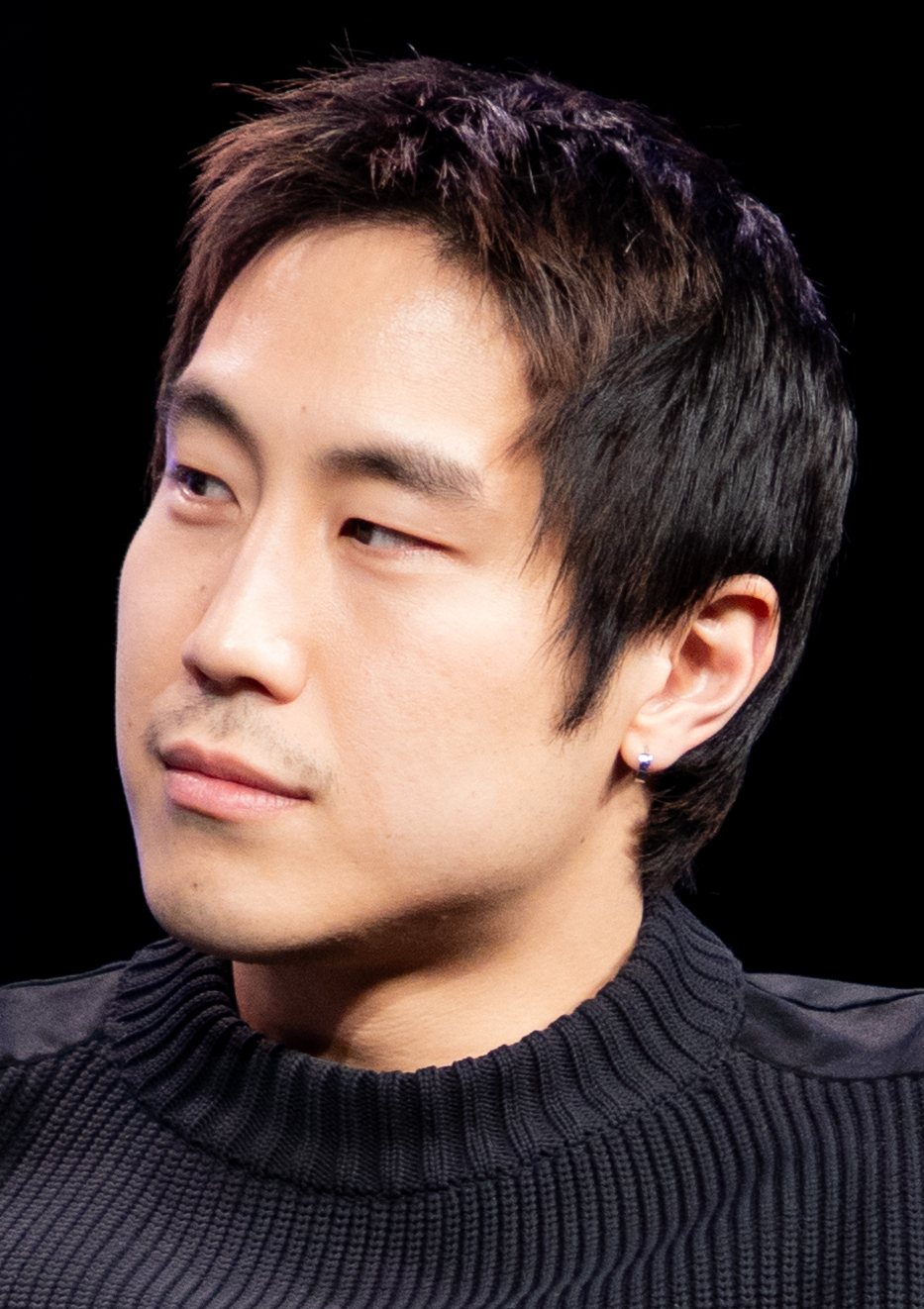
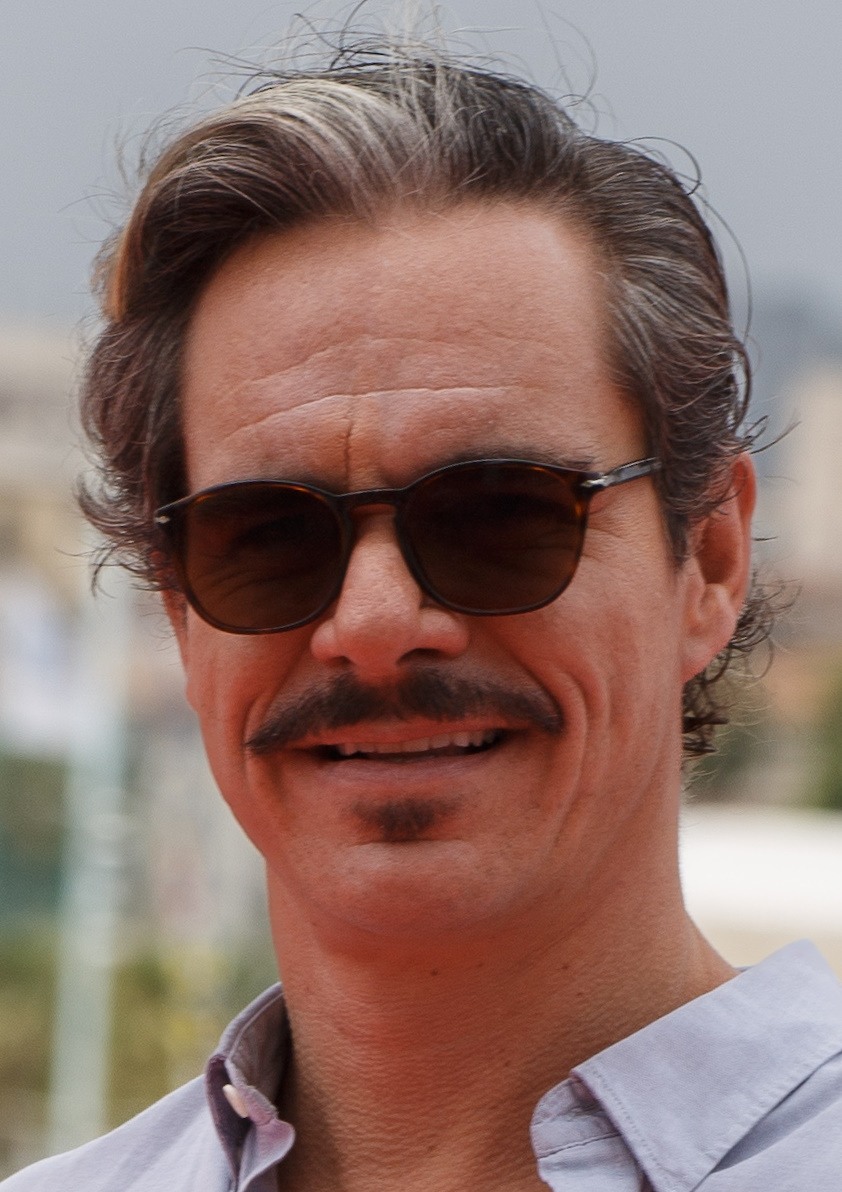
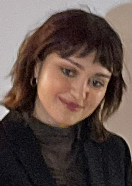
The second-season performances of Kaitlyn Dever, Catherine O'Hara, Jeffrey Wright, Joe Pantoliano (top), Isabela Merced, Young Mazino, Tony Dalton, and Ariela Barer (bottom) were praised by critics, (Note: Attributed to multiple references, per actor: Kaitlyn Dever; Catherine O'Hara; Jeffrey Wright; Joe Pantoliano; Isabela Merced; Young Mazino; Tony Dalton; Ariela Barer) and the first four guest actors were nominated for Emmy Awards.

The second season has a Rotten Tomatoes approval rating of 92% based on 272 reviews, and a Metacritic score of 81 out of 100 based on 44 reviews. Critics felt the season reinforced The Last of Us as the best video game adaptation; /Film's Jeremy Mathai felt it "sets a new standard for every video game adaptation" and lauded the unified creative vision of each production department, and Collider's Ross Bonaime declared it "one of 2025's best seasons of TV". Several reviewers compared the second episode's action sequences to Game of Thrones at its best, and many considered the sixth episode the standout for highlighting Joel and Ellie's relationship. The deeper themes and more complex characters were praised, though some reviewers felt the lack of scenes with Joel and Ellie left the second season weaker than the first, and others found the quicker pace detrimental and the narrative unsatisfyingly incomplete.

The performances in the second season received acclaim, with Pascal and Ramsey's chemistry continuing to receive praise; Rolling Stone's Alan Sepinwall found some episodes weaker for their absence. Critics lauded Pascal for bringing warmth, charisma, and hardiness to Joel, and Ramsey for developing Ellie into a traumatized young adult while maintaining emotional immaturity and playfulness. Many reviewers considered Merced the season's highlight for her compassion and humor, as well as her chemistry with Ramsey, and Dever's performance was lauded for her portrayal of grief, rage, and hatred; some felt her performance upstaged others'. Several critics applauded O'Hara's dramatic acting abilities, and Wright's captivating and menacing nature, immediately drawn in by his unsettling charisma. Critics praised Pantoliano for his depth and understated nature despite his limited appearance, and Dalton for his simultaneous warmth and firmness. Barer's performance was lauded for its powerful devastation, and praise was directed towards the performances of Luna, Mazino, and Wesley, though some reviewers considered them underserved and the characters underdeveloped. Inverse's Valerie Ettenhofer found some interactions "strangely artificial" in contrast to the first season.

=== Ratings ===
The premiere episode had 4.7 million viewers in the United States on its first night of availability, including linear viewers and streams on HBO Max, making it the second-largest debut for HBO since 2010, behind House of the Dragon. The total viewing figure increased to almost 40 million within two months. In Latin America, the series premiere was the biggest HBO Max debut ever. The video games increased their sales following the premiere. The second episode had 5.7 million viewers on its first night, an increase of 22% from the previous week, the largest second-week audience growth for an original HBO drama series in the network's history. The first two episodes averaged 21.3 million viewers by January 31, the first five almost 30 million by March 6, and the first six 30.4 million by March 12, the highest figure for an HBO series since Game of Thrones's eighth season, surpassing House of the Dragon's ten-episode average. With over three million viewers in the United Kingdom, the ninth episode became Sky's most-viewed finale for an American debut series, topping House of the Dragon's first-season finale. The series broke HBO's subscription video on demand viewer ratings in Europe, and became the most-watched show on HBO Max in Europe and Latin America. By May, the series averaged almost 32 million viewers per episode in the United States. It was HBO's most-watched debut season ever.

Viewership for the first season surged by 150% in the week preceding the second-season premiere. The episode had 5.3 million viewers in the United States on its first night—a 13% increase from the first-season premiere. The season was the most-viewed across all streaming services the following week. The finale had 3.7 million linear and streaming viewers on its first night—a 55% decrease from the first-season finale, which HBO attributed to the Memorial Day weekend, expecting viewership to grow later based on previous figures. By May, the season averaged almost 37 million global viewers per episode, larger than the first season's 32 million within 90 days. The series overall had received over 90 million total global viewers since the first-season finale. The video games saw sales and activity increases throughout the season; the series brought in more than four million new players and increased franchise engagement by around 150%.

=== Awards and nominations ===
The Last of Us is the first live-action video game adaptation to receive major awards consideration. The first season was nominated for 24 Primetime Emmy Awards, with a leading eight wins at the Creative Arts Emmy Awards, including for Offerman and Reid. From major guilds, it won two awards at the Screen Actors Guild Awards (including Best Actor for Pascal) and one at the Directors Guild of America Awards and Writers Guild of America Awards, and received two nominations at the Producers Guild of America Awards. It was nominated for three Critics' Choice Television Awards, three Golden Globe Awards, and five TCA Awards, and led the Astra Creative Arts TV Awards with six nominations. In genre awards, the series was nominated for five Saturn Awards. It led the MTV Movie & TV Awards with three wins, including Best Show, and was nominated for six awards at the People's Choice Awards, including Show of the Year. The series won a Peabody Award for Entertainment, and earned the biannual Seal of Authentic Representation from the Ruderman Family Foundation for Woodard's role as Sam.

The second season was nominated for 17 Primetime Emmy Awards, including Pascal and Ramsey's second nominations. It led the television nominees of the 25th Golden Trailer Awards with nine nominations for its marketing, and the 5th Critics' Choice Super Awards with six nominations, of which it won two. It received 13 nominations at the 5th Astra TV Awards, including Best Drama Series and nine acting nominees; Merced and Wright won Best Supporting Actress and Best Guest Actor in a Drama Series, respectively. Merced won the Next Generation Impact Award at the NHMC Impact Awards Gala for her roles in The Last of Us and Superman (2025), and Mazino received an honorable mention for Outstanding Supporting Performance from Gold House's Gold List in Television.
