= Rat king (disambiguation) =

A rat king is a rare phenomenon where a group of rats' tails become entangled.

Rat King or Ratking may also refer to:

== Fictional characters ==
- Rat King, in Adventure Time
- Rat King, in The Amazing Maurice and his Educated Rodents
- Rat King, in Hilda
- Rat King, in The Penguins of Madagascar
- Rat King (Teenage Mutant Ninja Turtles), in the Teenage Mutant Ninja Turtles multimedia franchise
- Rat King (The Last of Us), in The Last of Us Part II

== Other uses ==
- Ratking (novel), a 1988 novel by Michael Dibdin
- Ratking (group), a hip hop group from New York City
- Rat King, a 2012 Finnish thriller film by Petri Kotwica
- "The Rat King", 2015 season 5 episode 5 of Grimm
- "Rat King", 2012 season 2 episode 20 of Best of Luck Nikki (the Indian adaptation of Good Luck Charlie)
- Ratking (ラットキング, rattokingu), another English equivalent for the yakuza term

== See also ==
- "The King of Rats", a short story prequel set in the world of the young adult trilogy The Sin Eater's Daughter by Melinda Salisbury
- King Rat (disambiguation)
