= Emilia Schatz =

American video game designer

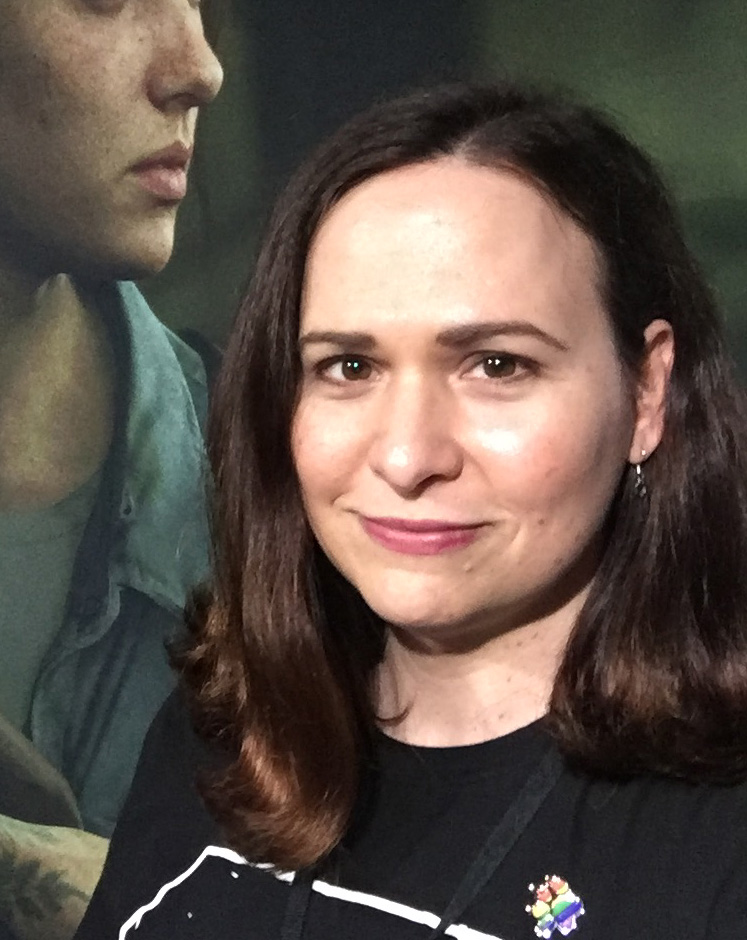
- Schatz at E3 2018
- Born: February 18, 1979 (age 47)
- Education: University of North Texas
- Occupation: Game designer
- Years active: 2002–present
- Employer: Naughty Dog (2010–present)
- Spouse: Katy

Emilia Schatz (born February 18, 1979) is an American video game designer best known for her work at Naughty Dog. She studied computer science at the University of North Texas, where she later worked before searching for work in the video game industry. She was hired at Terminal Reality, where she worked as a level scripter on Re-Mission, as a level designer on BlowOut and BloodRayne 2, and as a senior game designer on Ghostbusters: The Video Game. She was hired at Naughty Dog in 2009, and began working early in development on Uncharted 3: Drake's Deception, for which she designed several levels. She assisted with the development of The Last of Us.

Schatz came out as transgender in 2012, when she began her gender transition, and came out to the company in March 2014. She was promoted to co-lead game designer for the development of Uncharted 4: A Thief's End. In this role, she worked alongside Bruce Straley and Neil Druckmann and helped work on accessibility options. She was co-lead game designer for the development of The Last of Us Part II, during which she continued to lead the company's accessibility efforts. Her work and image in the industry has been praised and awarded.

== Early life ==
Emilia Schatz was born on February 18, 1979. She grew up in Texas. Her mother is an art teacher at an elementary school; Schatz felt that, outside of games, teaching would also be her career choice. As a child, Schatz was a fan of Nintendo games, specifically Mario and The Legend of Zelda, and had a fondness for the Nintendo Entertainment System and the Super Nintendo Entertainment System. Schatz's early jobs included mowing lawns, data entry, installing ethernet, and working at Golden Corral. At high school, she learned how to program role-playing games on her calculator. To pay for her university studies, Schatz worked with professors to create web pages. She studied computer science at Baylor University from 1997 to 1999. In 2001, she graduated from the University of North Texas with a Bachelor of Computer Science, with a major in general studies and minors in computer science, art, and English. As part of the university's Laboratory for Recreational Computing, Schatz worked on several educational games in Adobe Flash. She also used Flash to develop her own games, including one inspired by Tempest (1981) on a bootleg development environment for Game Boy Advance.

== Career ==
=== Terminal Reality (2002–2009) ===
Schatz worked at the University of North Texas for almost three years as a web developer after graduating. She applied to multiple game development studios in Dallas, and in August 2002 was hired by Terminal Reality as a level scripter on Re-Mission, which aligned with her former experience with educational Flash games; she designed several levels for Re-Mission. She worked as a level designer on BlowOut (2003) and BloodRayne 2; she found the latter jarring due to the oversexualization of the lead character. She worked as a senior game designer on the canceled Demonik and Ghostbusters: The Video Game (2009), and provided additional game design work on Kinect Star Wars (2012). She found Ghostbusters: The Video Game "really fun to work on" but was becoming restless and felt she "wasn't making the games I always wished I could make".

Following the release of Ghostbusters: The Video Game, having spent seven years at Terminal Reality, Schatz began applying for positions at her "dream studios", including Double Fine and Naughty Dog; she noted that she "wasn't that interested" in Sony's games until she played Naughty Dog's Uncharted: Drake's Fortune (2007), and had enjoyed the cinematic qualities of Crash Bandicoot and Jak and Daxter, so felt it would be a good studio to work with. The studio was preparing to release Uncharted 2: Among Thieves (2009) at the time, which delayed Schatz's application and interview. She had a phone interview with Naughty Dog, and was later flown out for an in-person test and interview in November 2009. As part of the test, she had to design a level in 30 minutes; by the end of the day, she was hired.

=== Naughty Dog (2010–present) ===
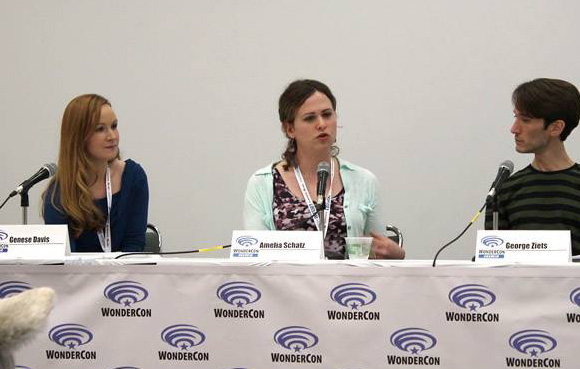
Wondercon 2015

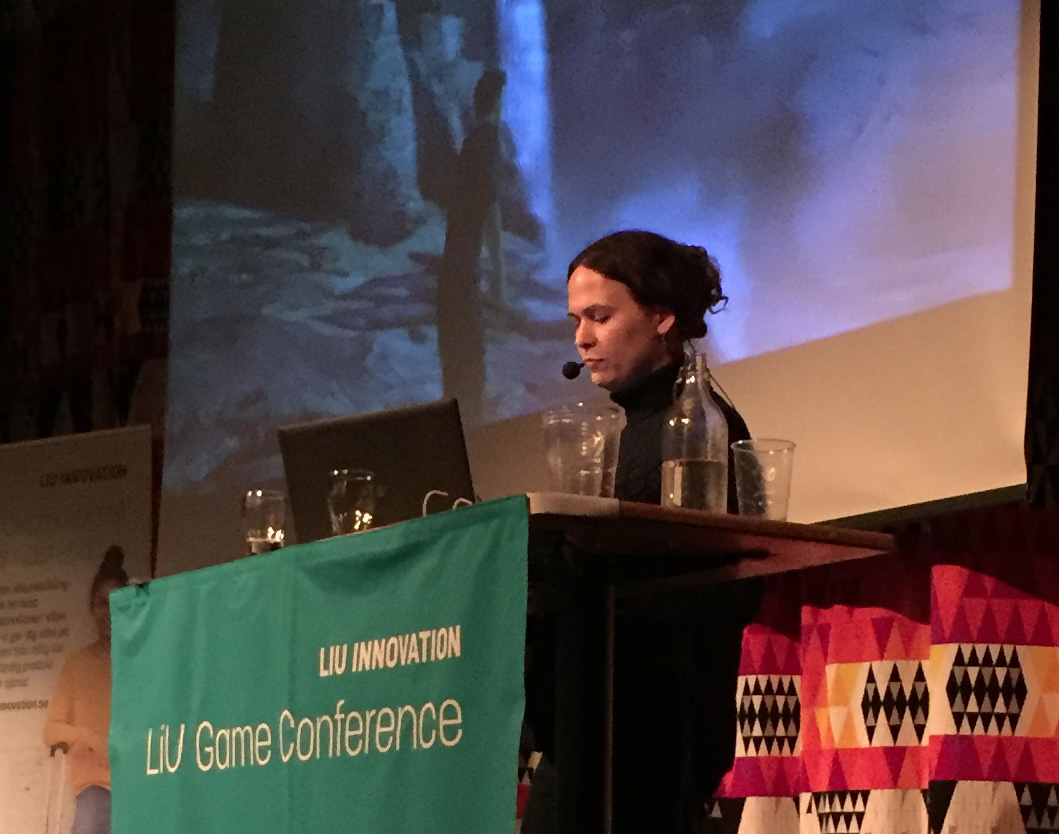
LiU Game Conference 2016

Schatz has presented at several conferences.

Schatz's first day at Naughty Dog was January 6, 2010. She began working at the company early in development on Uncharted 3: Drake's Deception (2011), designing the French château level, the foot chase, and the ending's underground and collapse segments. She often referenced The Legend of Zelda when designing levels, and cited Don Norman's usability engineering research in guiding the player. One of her strengths is dynamic environmental levels, such as collapsing buildings. In April 2012, Schatz participated in a panel discussion at PAX East alongside game director Justin Richmond and community strategist Arne Meyer. After the release of Uncharted 3, Schatz assisted with the final months of the development of The Last of Us (2013), providing additional design instead of creating from scratch; she designed the segment in which the player runs from an armored truck, as well as one of the final levels as the player escapes from the hospital, which she took over from designer Peter Field.

Schatz participated in a panel discussion about queer identities in gaming at GaymerX in July 2014, in a panel about game design at PlayStation Experience in December 2014, and at a panel at WonderCon in April 2015. For the development of Uncharted 4: A Thief's End (2016), Schatz was promoted to co-lead game designer, overseeing level creation and checking in with artists and programmers working on them. She designed the Scotland, Marooned, and No Escape levels, as well as some of the mechanics like rock climbing and slope sliding, and regularly met with game director Bruce Straley and creative director Neil Druckmann to discuss story and overall direction. Schatz and user interface (UI) designer Alex Neonakis collaborated on the accessibility options, having received emails and messages from disabled gamers requesting them. Schatz noted the push for accessibility was initially a struggle, but they had much more support by the end of development.

Schatz felt Uncharted 4's crunch was Naughty Dog's worst and she was often critical of her own work until later in development. She spoke at the Wonder Women Tech Conference in July 2016, and was named among the 100 Most Creative People by Fast Company in 2017 "for helping the gaming industry evolve". She began providing lectures in the level design course at CG Master Academy; she learned more about her own design work by breaking it down for the classes, and found the process rewarding to see the students' improvement. She sought to continue supplemental teaching work in the future to guide aspiring game developers.

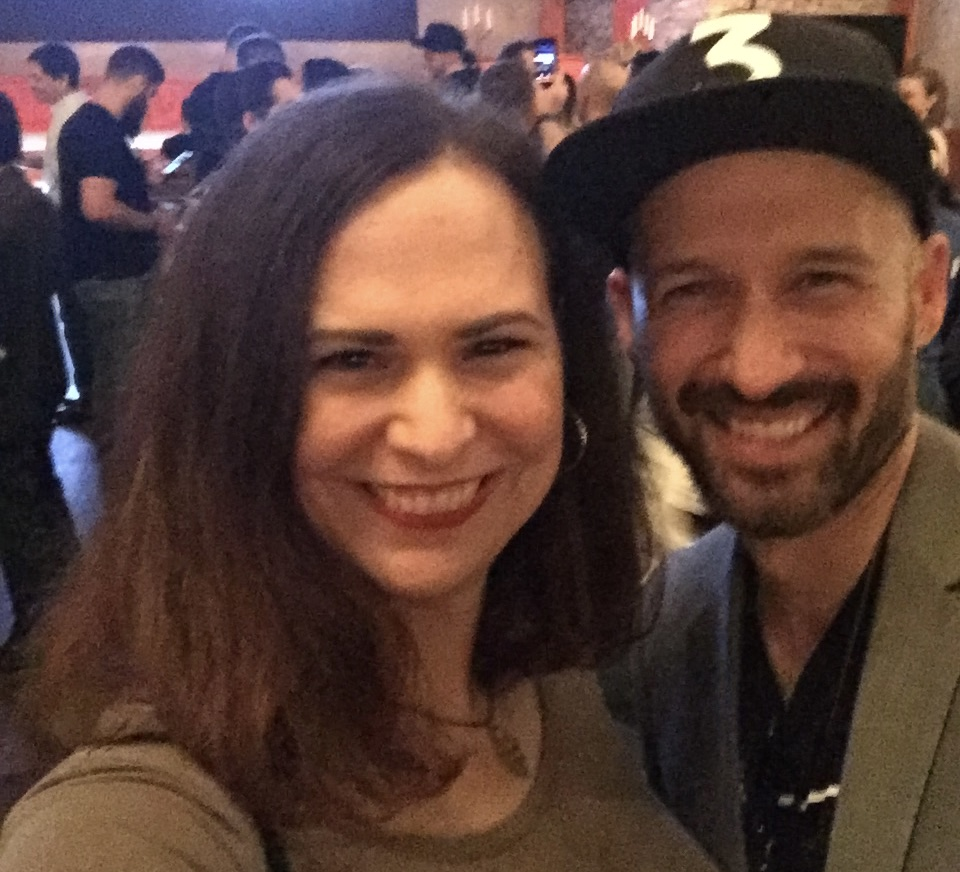
Schatz was part of the leadership team for the development of The Last of Us Part II as co-lead game designer alongside Richard Cambier (right).

Schatz was part of the leadership team for the development of The Last of Us Part II (2020) as co-lead game designer alongside Richard Cambier, one of two women in the leadership team alongside narrative lead Halley Gross. In December 2016, she crocheted a yarn doll of the protagonist, Ellie, and provided instructions on Naughty Dog's website. The depiction of queer and transgender characters was personally important to Schatz, though she anticipated it would receive criticism; she helped the writers create a transgender character, Lev, as Druckmann wanted to ensure appropriate representation. Schatz was responsible for the addition of a rainbow crosswalk and transgender flag in the Capitol Hill level, and designed a queer bookstore, working with Gross.

Schatz continued leading the studio's accessibility efforts for The Last of Us Part II, now alongside lead systems designer Matthew Gallant. They ensured these options were prioritized early in development. Schatz felt Uncharted 4's accessibility options were "pretty sparse" despite the praise they received, and sought to improve them in The Last of Us Part II. She started working on the accessibility after being questioned about the options at GAconf, wanting to ensure all players could complete the game, including her mother. Schatz and Gallant presented a talk about their work at GAconf 2020 and accepted the award for Innovation in Accessibility at the Game Awards 2020, while Schatz accepted Outstanding Video Game at the 32nd GLAAD Media Awards. She was co-nominated for Outstanding Achievement in Game Design at the 24th Annual D.I.C.E. Awards, and 80 Level's Arti Sergeev named her one of the six developers at Naughty Dog who "revolutionized the industry" in June 2020.

Schatz appeared in the documentary Grounded II: Making The Last of Us Part II (2024), in which she discussed Uncharted 4's impact on development of The Last of Us Part II, the initial idea to make it open world, and the impact of crunch as she ages. Schatz is working as principal game designer on Intergalactic: The Heretic Prophet, announced in December 2024.

== Personal life ==
Assigned male at birth, Schatz began the process of gender transition in 2012, coming out to her family and friends. In late 2012, she began anonymously talking with human resources at Sony to discover more about the company's diversity guidelines. She came out to Naughty Dog's head of operations and organized a plan to send a company-wide email on March 14, 2014, which they coordinated with co-presidents Christophe Balestra and Evan Wells. The company set up the transition so Schatz had a new email address, business cards, and company head shot when she returned the following week; her name was changed in the credits of The Last of Us Remastered (2014). Nervous about the response, Schatz brought in cookies made by her wife. In deciding to come out, she described the process as "less of an 'if' and more of a 'when'", as she was beginning to suffer emotionally by pretending to identify as male at work.

Schatz and her wife Katy, a young adult fantasy novelist, live in Santa Monica with their daughter and cats. Their daughter was born on December 24, 2017. Some of Schatz's favorite games that have influenced her as developer include The Legend of Zelda: A Link to the Past (1991), Secret of Mana (1993), Final Fantasy VI (1994), and Super Metroid (1994). She has a particular interest in Metroidvania games due to the exploration and discovery of secrets. Schatz participated in the 2017 Women's March.

== Works ==
Video games

Year	Game title	Role
2003	BlowOut	Senior level designer
2004	BloodRayne 2	Level designer
2006	Re-Mission	Level designer
2009	Ghostbusters: The Video Game	Game designer
2011	Uncharted 3: Drake's Deception	Game designer
2012	Kinect Star Wars	Additional design
2013	The Last of Us	Additional game designer
2014	The Last of Us: Left Behind	Additional game designer
2016	Uncharted 4: A Thief's End	Co-lead game designer
2020	The Last of Us Part II	Co-lead game designer
TBA	Intergalactic: The Heretic Prophet	Principal game designer

Other

- 2024 – Grounded II: Making The Last of Us Part II (documentary)
