= Squirrel king =

Group of squirrels whose tails are tangled together

A squirrel king is a collection of squirrels whose tails have tangled together, making them unable to separate themselves. It is similar to a phenomenon recorded in rats, the rat king. A squirrel king starts as a litter of young in the same nest, whose tails become knotted together by nesting materials and/or by tree sap gluing the tails together, particularly if the young squirrels have been gnawing bark of the tree that their nest is in, letting sap flow. If the squirrels are not separated, they may fall to the ground still joined to each other when they try to come out of their nest, and will invariably die unless separated through human intervention. Unlike the rat king, the squirrel king is not found in medieval European literature.

== List of naturally occurring incidents ==
Occurrence	Quantity of squirrels	Location	Country	Description and outcome
September 1989	4	Easton, Pennsylvania	United States	They were severely injured and euthanized.
1991	5	Baltimore, Maryland	United States	They were tangled and glued together by tree sap. They were successfully separated. Of the 5, 2 were albino squirrels.
July 1997	5	Brantford, Ontario	Canada	They were tangled and glued together by tree sap. They were successfully separated.
June 2013	6	Regina, Saskatchewan	Canada	They were tangled and glued together by tree sap. They were successfully separated alive.
26 August 2013	5	Michigan City, Indiana	United States	Babies were almost euthanized after initial failures at separation. The day after disentanglement they returned to their mother.
November 2014	3	Maryland	United States	Glued together by tree sap.
29 April 2016	3	Beaver Falls, Pennsylvania	United States	Juveniles were successfully untangled.
May 2016	5	Winnipeg, Manitoba	Canada	Babies were successfully separated.
21 May 2017	4	Bangor, Maine	United States	Juveniles were successfully separated, then released that day to reunite with their mother.
mid-May 2018	6	Elkhorn, Nebraska	United States	8-week-olds were successfully untangled, and all lived.
Summer 2018	4	Nova Scotia	Canada	By the time the juveniles were discovered, 3 had died. To separate them, the tail of the survivor had to be amputated.
mid-September 2018	4	Loveland, Colorado	United States	Babies were successfully separated at the Larimer Humane Society.
23 September 2018	3	Boulder, Colorado	United States	They were successfully untangled.
September 2018	5	Wisconsin	United States	They were successfully untangled.
May 2019	4	Stockton on Tees, County Durham, England	United Kingdom	Babies were successfully separated.
19 September 2019	4	Beacon Falls, Connecticut	United States	Babies were successfully separated, however, part of 1 tail needed to be amputated.
10 September 2020	5	Multnomah Village, Oregon	United States	Babies were separated.
24 May 2021	5	Duluth, Minnesota	United States	Five young squirrels found in a compost pile stuck together by their tails. Gathered babies in a cardboard box to transport to local vet parking lot to free them. All babies were rescued and they ran away shortly after.
1 October 2021	7	Grand Blanc Township, Michigan	United States	Babies were successfully separated by police officers.
14 May 2022	7	Seaforth, Ontario	Canada	Babies were successfully separated.
September 2023	3	Eagan, Minnesota	United States	Three adolescent squirrels found in a brush pile with entangled tails. All three tails needed to be partially amputated. Food and water were provided; two of three survived and ran off.
11 September 2023	5	Norfolk, Massachusetts	United States	Five babies were rescued after falling out of their nest due to tails being stuck together with tree sap.
11 September 2024	5	Bend, Oregon	United States	Several squirrels were pictured stuck together and unstuck by a local wildlife organization.
30 September 2024	5	Erie, Colorado	United States	Five juvenile squirrels fell out of an ash tree. Overnighted in a cardboard box, in a garage, before being successfully separated by a local wildlife organization the next day. All were released, within 20 hours, back to the tree from which they fell.
6 June 2025	5	Dwight, Ontario	Canada	Five squirrels — three babies, one juvenile, and one adult — stuck together with sap, leaves, and a string. Adult squirrel pulled loose on its own, damaging tail. Juvenile and babies were successfully separated with soapy water.
15 May 2026	5	Gansevoort, New York	United States	Five juvenile squirrels were tangled by tails by fibrous plant material in a nest. Two were already dead, one had to be euthanized due to tail having been wrapped around a hind foot, cutting off circulation and causing necrosis, and two survived.
22 May 2026	6	Glen Ellyn, Illinois	United States	Six squirrels bound up with plastic, straw, and fur. Successfully rescued by DuPage Wildlife Conservation Center.
13 October 2026	3	Fortville, Indiana	United States	A Good Samaritan recently brought a group of young squirrels whose tails became tangled together by fibers and grasses from their nest as they grew, leaving them unable to separate. Each squirrel was individually sedated so the team could carefully untangle their tails. Two of their doctors and a veterinary student then performed surgery to save as much of each tail as possible. They hopeful for their recovery, but returning to the wild may be difficult. They will continue to monitor their progress and determine what’s best for each squirrel moving forward. https://www.facebook.com/share/1CNbsezSoA/?mibextid=wwXIfr

== Non-natural incidents ==
There have been incidents of animal cruelty or taxidermic artwork, where humans tied the tails of squirrels together, making something resembling the natural squirrel king.

=== Incidents of animal cruelty ===
- On 19 September 2019, 4 squirrels were found knotted together and tied up, on railroad tracks in Berlin, Connecticut, USA. They survived to be separated, but needed some amputation. In order to tie them up, the person who performed the act had to break their tails.
