= Rat King (The Last of Us) =

Fictional monster

- The Last of Us character
- First appearance: The Last of Us Part II (2020)
- Designed by: Danilo Athayde (modeler); Beau Anthony Jimenez (sound design); David Kim (technical director); Jeremy Yates (animation)
- Motion capture: Kelli Barksdale; Amy Johnston; Jesse La Flair; Chris Robbins

In-universe information
- Species: Infected amalgamation

The Rat King is a monster in the 2020 video game The Last of Us Part II. It is an amalgamation of multiple zombie-like infected monsters, inspired by a real rat king, which is formed when rats become entangled by their tails. The concept of two infected stuck together was conceived during the development of the first game, The Last of Us (2013), but the developers struggled to find an appropriate location within the story. The concept returned for the second game as the team sought an intense sequence for protagonist Abby.

The development team had several inspirations when creating the creature and boss fight, including the video games Inside (2016) and God of War (2018) and the films Zygote (2017) and Annihilation (2018). The creature's movements were performed by multiple motion-capture actors using a cage on large caster wheels, while its sounds include several layered animal noises. Critics found the boss fight terrifying, and some academics felt it symbolized elements of the characters and humanity.

== Appearances ==
The Last of Us is set decades after the collapse of society caused by a mass fungal infection that transforms its hosts into zombie-like creatures known as the "infected". The Rat King is an amalgamation of several infected creatures, having grown for 25 years in a hospital basement—ground zero for the outbreak in Seattle, Washington. In The Last of Us Part II (2020), the player visits the hospital as Ellie; they later return from Abby's perspective, encountering the creature in the basement as a boss fight. As it takes damage, the Rat King loses some of the infected from its body; partway through the fight, a stalker—a type of infected capable of moving silently—breaks off and fights Abby alongside the larger bloater.

In "Feel Her Love", a second-season episode of the television adaptation of The Last of Us, a character mentions that the basement has no inhabitants, "not even rats", which viewers and journalists considered a hint at the Rat King's upcoming appearance in the series.

== Concept and creation ==
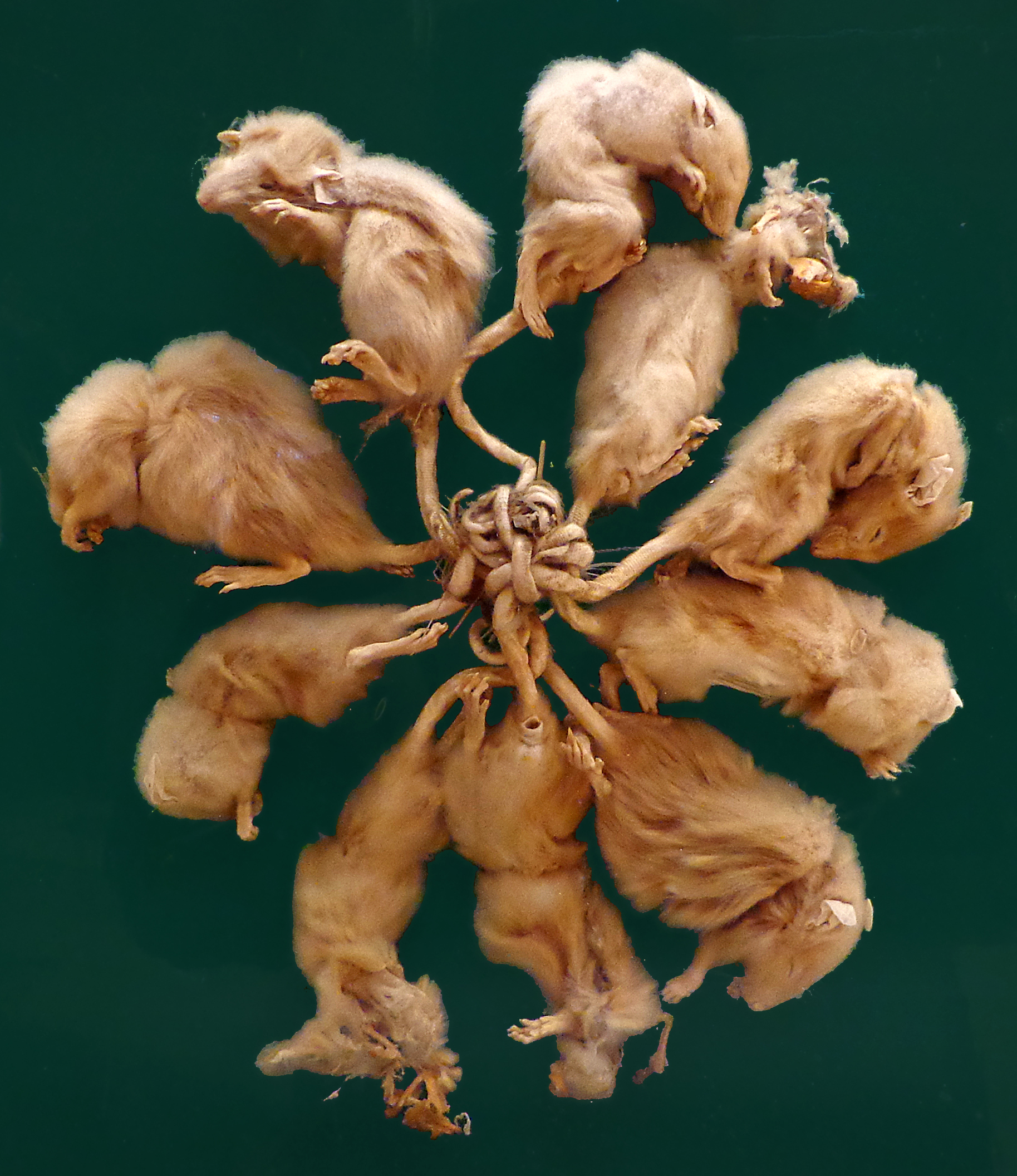
The creature is based on a real rat king, an amalgamation of rats stuck together by their tails.

The creature is based on a real rat king—an amalgamation of rats stuck together by their tails, which has become a staple of horror folklore. It is not named in the game. According to co-director Anthony Newman, the concept of two infected stuck together was conceived during the development of the first game, The Last of Us (2013); concept art was created but the development team at Naughty Dog struggled to find an appropriate location within the story. The idea returned for the second game as the team sought an intense "trial by fire sequence" for Abby. Concept art for the encounter was designed by artists like Naughty Dog's Sebastian Gromann and One Pixel Brush's Jad Saber. David Kim was the technical director and Danilo Athayde was the modeler and character artist.

The Rat King's noises were created by sound designer Beau Anthony Jimenez. When he started, he only had access to early art and motion-capture animations. He waited until later in the game's development to create the Rat King's sounds, wanting to finalize all other infected sounds first. He layered in sounds like avian squawks, big cat roars, and snake hisses alongside "gargles, gags, and sloppy wet gore sounds to add a sickening realism". The stalker's sounds were created using slowed-down cries of falcons and vultures, which Jimenez felt "sounded almost like a tortured human".

Jimenez was dissatisfied with the original idea to introduce the Rat King with a jump scare; he wanted to tell a story with its audio as the player hears it approaching in the distance. Inspired by the mutant bear in the film Annihilation (2018), he intended to make players believe the sounds were from a smaller creature until they pitched into a lower rumble, which he felt "raised the spook-factor to the nth degree". Creative director Neil Druckmann approved Jimenez's ideas, and the work was assigned to the character animation team. The developers were inspired by creatures in the video game Inside (2016) and Neill Blomkamp's short film Zygote (2017); the gelatinous effect of the former prompted them to introduce ragdoll physics to the growths on the Rat King's back.

Several techniques were used to capture the Rat King's movements, including two motion-capture actors tied together.

Lead animator Jeremy Yates studied real rat king specimens to understand their function, believing the individual parts needed to work together. The team used several techniques to capture the creature's movement, and felt the performers required endurance and strength. In one instance, three actors—including parkour athlete Jesse La Flair and stunt actor Kelli Barksdale—were tied together to allow the developers to understand the creature's multi-limbed motion. In another, stunt actors Chris Robbins and Amy Johnston were connected at the hip, portraying the bloater and stalker, respectively, as the creature split; La Flair also played the stalker, with movement akin to a rabid dog. The team built a cage on large caster wheels, which Robbins and some assistants swung while La Flair moved quickly.

When designing the level, the team criticized it as a "very flat interaction" as it essentially consisted of the player shooting and running repetitively. Lead designer Richard Cambier introduced the idea of "pseudo-dead ends", allowing for narrow escapes within claustrophobic areas and leaving space between the player and the Rat King. The team wanted to ensure the creature was always in sight while avoiding inevitable deaths, not wanting the player to "feel like the environment cheated" them. They felt the stalker splitting off made the fight more interesting, inspired by Magni and Modi in God of War (2018), who fought with a fast and slow weapon, respectively. The stalker fight was inspired by Eileen the Crow from Bloodborne (2015); Newman liked the idea that a smaller creature could be just as deadly as the larger one.

== Reception ==
Some critics found the boss fight the series's scariest moment; TheGamer's George Foster compared it to the first game's bloater encounters. GameSpot's Darryn Bonthuys and Nathan Ellingsworth considered the Rat King among the most disgusting video game monsters, and Dread Central's Jay Krieger praised the boss fight as well-made and unexpected, considering the setting claustrophobic and the creature to be the culmination of all monster designs in the series, becoming more intimidating by using each of their traits. Inverse's Jake Kleinman deemed it the best boss fight of 2020, considering it unique from other battles in the series due to the necessity to keep distance while maintaining visibility. He felt forced to adjust the difficulty level and increase the brightness to make the Rat King less frightening, which changed how he played games "forever". Kotaku's Ari Notis criticized the battle as "mindless" and repetitive, noting the checkpoints diminished the player's need to strategize. He felt the game ultimately treated the encounter as "banal" as Abby never mentions it.

The scholar Sara Humphreys called the encounter "a metaphorical representation of patriarchal power": the creature being named a "king" indicated its power, yet Abby's victory defied savior and damsel tropes. Merlin Seller felt part of the Rat King's horror is that it is "still human", noting that its hybrid body reflects the "messy co-operation and conflict" that players feel within themselves, and Patricia Saldarriaga and Emy Manini cited the creature as an example of the liminality between humans and non-humans. Amy M. Green wrote that the creature represents humanity's violence after the outbreak and symbolizes both Abby and Ellie's relationships with their loved ones and communities, fracturing and collapsing due to infighting, as well as with each other, as their lives are bound together. The Blade's Will Harrison likened Ellie to the Rat King: "a writhing mass that lashes out for reasons she can no longer fully understand". Comparing the Rat King's boss fight with the two fights between Abby and Ellie, Bloody Disgusting's Stacey Henley considered the latter the "true horror" due to the possibility of either combatant dying.
