= King Rat =

King Rat may refer to:

== Arts and entertainment ==
- King Rat (1962 novel), a novel by James Clavell set in World War II
  - King Rat (film), released in 1965, based on the James Clavell novel
- King Rat (1998 novel), an urban fantasy novel by China Miéville
- King Rat (band), a punk rock band from Denver, Colorado, founded in 1994
- "King Rat" (song), a 2-track vinyl promo by Modest Mouse, released in 2007
- King Rat, a traditional character and main antagonist in the pantomime Dick Whittington

== Other uses ==
- King Rat, the head of the Grand Order of Water Rats, a music hall society of Great Britain
- "King Rat", nickname of Billy Wright (loyalist) (1960–1997), Ulster loyalist paramilitary leader during the Troubles in Northern Ireland, and an autobiography he wrote detailing his activities
- Uromys rex, a species of rat

== See also ==
- Rat king (disambiguation)
