= Development of The Last of Us Part II =

Approximately 2,100 people developed The Last of Us Part II over more than five years, led by the 350-person team at Naughty Dog. Sony Interactive Entertainment published the action-adventure game in June 2020 for the PlayStation 4; a remastered version was released in January 2024 for the PlayStation 5, and in April 2025 for Windows. A sequel to the 2013 game The Last of Us, Part II's core development began after the 2014 release of The Last of Us Remastered. Neil Druckmann returned as creative director, co-writing the story with Halley Gross, while Anthony Newman and Kurt Margenau were chosen as game directors. Matthew Gallant was Remastered's game director.

After its announcement in 2016, the game was fervently promoted with press showings, cinematic trailers, and special editions. Its release date was subject to several delays, partly due to the COVID-19 pandemic. The development reportedly included a crunch schedule of 12-hour work days and was slowed by the enormous turnover of employees following the development of Uncharted 4: A Thief's End (2016), while the team was forced to operate via remote work arrangements in the final months due to the COVID-19 pandemic. Development costs for Part II totaled around US$220 million, making it one of the most expensive video games to develop.

For the story, Druckmann was inspired by his own experiences growing up in the West Bank, where violence was a frequent topic. Gross also took her own experience with post-traumatic stress disorder with the game's characters. Ashley Johnson and Troy Baker reprised their roles as Ellie and Joel, respectively, recording their motion and voice simultaneously. Ellie is one of two main playable characters in the game; the other, Abby, was portrayed by Laura Bailey. The change was inspired by a similar switch in the first game. The writers wanted to portray Abby's vulnerabilities, aware that players would likely initially dislike her but eventually empathize.

The developers pushed the technical capabilities of the PlayStation 4 for Part II, creating larger environments and adding more enemies than previously. The advancement of the game's artificial intelligence granted deeper connections with characters; some gameplay elements were similarly intended to create an emotional response from players. The game was originally planned as an open world game, but became more linear to better serve the narrative. The accessibility options were seen as an extension of those introduced in Uncharted 4, and the developers attended conferences and worked with advocates. Gustavo Santaolalla returned to compose and perform the score; Mac Quayle contributed additional combat music.

== History and overview ==
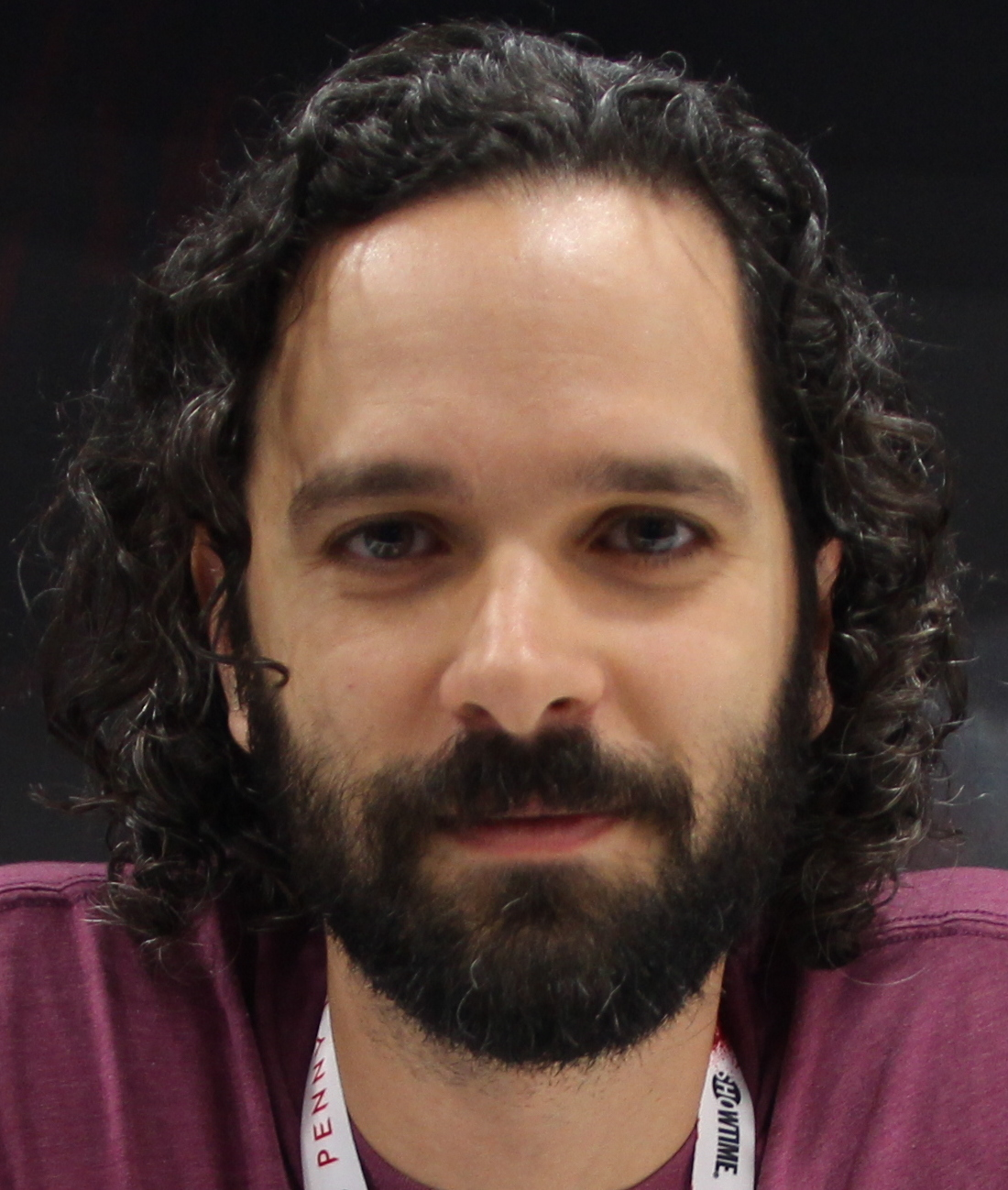
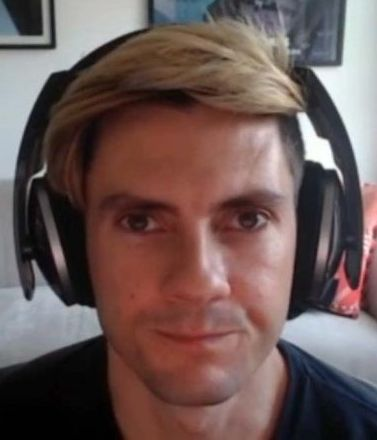
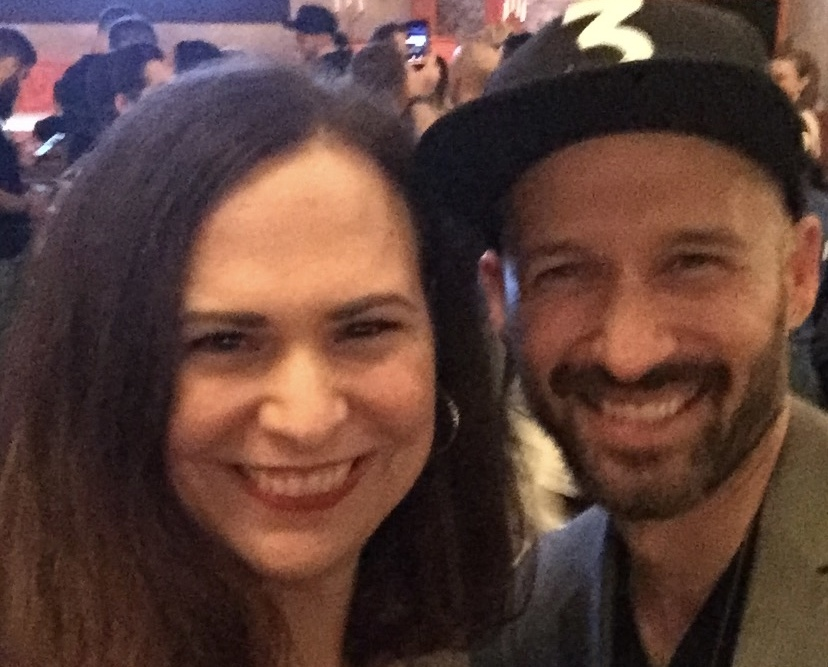
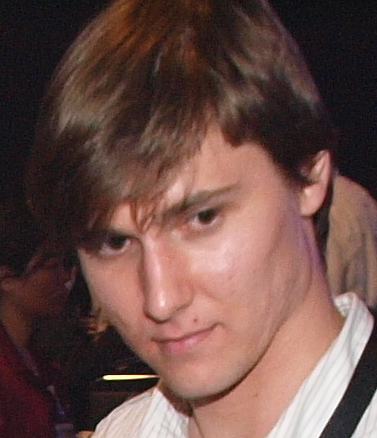
The Last of Us Part II's leadership team consisted of (clockwise from top left) Neil Druckmann as creative director, Anthony Newman and Kurt Margenau as game directors, and Richard Cambier and Emilia Schatz as lead game designers.

Approximately 2,169 developers across 14 studios worked on The Last of Us Part II. Story concepts were first conceived in late 2013, following the development and release of The Last of Us. Development began in 2014, soon after the release of The Last of Us Remastered. By August 2017, with the release of Uncharted: The Lost Legacy, the entire 350-person team at Naughty Dog had shifted to develop Part II. Neil Druckmann led development as creative director and writer, reprising his role from The Last of Us and Uncharted 4: A Thief's End (2016). Bruce Straley, game director on the original game, left Naughty Dog in 2017; Druckmann felt that the dynamic on Part II, the first game he co-directed without Straley, was different as a result.

Anthony Newman and Kurt Margenau were selected to be co-game directors for Part II, a first for Naughty Dog as the position was previously held by one person. Both were hired during the development of Uncharted 2: Among Thieves (2009); Newman was the melee combat designer for The Last of Us, and Margenau was game director on Uncharted: The Lost Legacy. Margenau and Newman oversaw and approved the gameplay elements, such as level design and mechanics. Co-lead game designers Emilia Schatz and Richard Cambier were also part of the creative leadership team, continuing their roles from the development of Uncharted 4.

Druckmann identified that, while Naughty Dog was granted the freedom to create any type of game, they were energized when presented the option to make a sequel to The Last of Us due to the importance of the characters, despite knowing it would divide some fans. The team subtitled the game as Part II because they viewed it as an extension of the first. Druckmann wanted Part II to be as effective a sequel as The Godfather Part II (1974) was to The Godfather (1972). As resources were shifted to improving the scale of the game, plans for multiplayer were canceled, shifted to a standalone game, The Last of Us Online, which was canceled in December 2023. Naughty Dog said Part II was the longest game they had made.

For the final months of development, the team shifted to remote work due to the COVID-19 pandemic, though they were given the option to do so prior to the mandatory stay-at-home order in California; the operations management department ensured the transition was smooth, as the studio housed technology such as development kits that were not accessible in home setups. Druckmann felt lucky that development was almost complete by the time the pandemic spread in the United States. Game development ceased by May 4, 2020, when it was submitted for manufacturing. According to documents from publisher Sony Interactive Entertainment, the 70-month development peaked at 200 full-time employees and cost around US$220 million, making it one of the most expensive video games to develop.

The development, according to a report by Kotaku's Jason Schreier, included a crunch schedule of 12-hour work days owing to the studio culture; after the game's delay, developers continued under this schedule for the additional months. Schreier suggested that development was affected and slowed due to the enormous turnover of employees following the development of Uncharted 4, with few veterans left on the team. Some of the developers working on the game allegedly hoped that the game would fail to prove that the working conditions they are under are not viable. Sony granted Naughty Dog an additional two weeks of development for bug fixes. Druckmann felt that he failed to find the correct balance for employees on Part II, and said the studio would receive external assistance for future projects.

== Story and setting ==
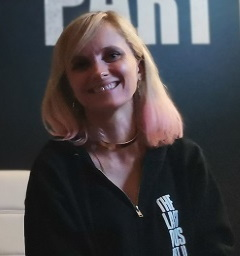
Halley Gross was approached to collaborate as a writer shortly after completing her work on Westworld.

Druckmann, who was promoted to Vice President of Naughty Dog in 2018, had less time to write on Part II than on The Last of Us; he wrote the majority of the latter, but less than half of the former. Halley Gross was approached to collaborate as a writer on the game shortly after she had completed her work on Westworld in 2016. She was hired as a writer early in development to help Druckmann outline the story and decipher characters. She felt that she and Druckmann had very similar tastes and interests. When Gross joined the project, Druckmann had a structure for the entire story; Gross felt that her perspective on characters and trauma added to the narrative. When crafting the story further, Druckmann and Gross created an outline and presented it to the studio to "stress-test" it. They then worked in non-chronological order with animators, layout designers, and other departments to develop ideas. Each section of the game was mapped on a wall using notecards; a section was scrapped if it did not contribute to the overall narrative momentum, or was "just cool for the sake of being cool". Druckmann found that the additional voice of Gross led to more believable characters, particularly regarding romance and comedy. When she assumed more responsibilities about two years into development, Gross was given the title of "narrative lead". Josh Scherr and Ryan James contributed to additional in-game dialogue, with Scherr also writing the descriptions of the collectible cards.

Druckmann felt that his time working on Uncharted 4 for two years allowed the story of Part II to slowly develop. The team experimented with different plot structures and considered scrapping the game entirely until they settled on an idea that mirrored the first game; Druckmann identified that The Last of Us is about the extreme measures one would take for love, whereas Part II is more about how far one would go to bring justice for those they love. He initially stated that, while the first game focuses on love, Part II centers on hate; he later rephrased that both games are about love, analyzing the best and worst it can offer. He felt that the town of Jackson represented the best, as its population attempted to live morally in a world representing the real one, while the war between the Washington Liberation Front (WLF) and the Seraphites demonstrates the worst, despite some glimpses of hope within the lives of the former. Druckmann predicted that some players would dislike the game's story, but said that he would prefer passionate hate over apathy. He found that some players considered the characters in the first game to be "sacred" and wanted to ensure that was not the case with the sequel.

The game's themes of revenge and retribution were inspired by Druckmann's own experiences growing up in the West Bank, where violence was a frequent topic. He specifically recalled watching footage of the 2000 Ramallah lynching and how, after hearing the cheering crowds, his mind immediately turned to violent thoughts of revenge against them; he later admitted to feeling "gross and guilty" for having these thoughts. He wanted the player to feel a "thirst for revenge" before making them realize the reality of their actions. Once he had settled on a basic concept, the remainder of the narrative outline was complete within weeks. He noted that some members of the team felt reluctant about the game's cynicism, but ultimately he preferred a divisive story than a "mundane" one. He found that stories showing the cost of revenge were more nuanced, and wanted to use the interactivity of the medium to push these feelings to players. He found that people often want to bring someone to justice after witnessing a horrible act, but are unable to do so due to laws and society; in the game's world, where these societal structures no longer exist, he saw an opportunity to explore this concept. When researching for the game, he watched the documentary films Paradise Lost: The Child Murders at Robin Hood Hills (1996) and its sequels Revelations (2000) and Purgatory (2011), and found it particularly interesting when parents would make comments in interviews about wanting to hurt or kill the West Memphis Three over the murder allegations; he felt that these comments were the "perversion of love", wanting to commit a heinous act to bring justice for those they love. He also referenced Dave Grossman's book On Killing (1996), which discusses the desensitization of violence for soldiers.

Druckmann noted that the game's other themes include tribalism, trauma, and the pursuit of justice. He felt that humans often dehumanize those they oppose in order to justify their own actions in the chase for justice; he found this particularly relevant in modern politics and online discourse, and wanted to explore it within the game without being overly "preachy". Gross added that "one man's justice is another man's revenge" and wanted the story to show different perspectives and consequences. Druckmann felt that the depiction of violent acts was necessary in a story that deals with the cycle of violence, but welcomed members of the team to work on other elements of the game if anything made them uncomfortable. Co-art director John Sweeney pushed for realism in the violence, particularly with minimizing it instead of embellishing. The inclusion of a PlayStation Vita playing Hotline Miami (2012), a game with similar themes about violence of which Druckmann and the team are fans, was considered an extension of the theme; earlier versions used another Naughty Dog game, but Dennaton Games allowed the team to use Hotline Miami. Cambier noted that Ellie's violent acts are committed for love or for hate, and were therefore justified by the narrative.

The game underwent several changes throughout production. Initial pre-production concepts included Ellie discovering information about other immune people. Later in development, the game had five days in Seattle instead of three, including an additional side story wherein Ellie traveled to the Seraphite island, which was intended to humanize the Seraphite characters more. An earlier version of the farm sequence featured a playable sequence of Ellie hunting a boar; gameplay, art, and performance was completed, but the sequence was cut for pacing purposes and is instead referenced in Ellie's journal. In an earlier draft, Joel had a girlfriend named Esther, who was originally mentioned as part of a live performance of some scenes from the first game called The Last of Us: One Night Live (2014). In the drafts, Esther lived in a town about two hours away from Jackson. In an early version of a flashback, Ellie and Joel traveled to Esther and found that she had been bitten; her death triggered a conversation between Ellie and Joel about a cure. The character was later scrapped as the writers felt she was established too quickly, and was more relevant to Joel's arc than Ellie's. A love letter from Esther remained for some time afterwards, but was eventually cut from the final game.

Druckmann identified that the first game's pacing was like a film, but he wanted Part II to be reflective of a novel, with several quiet moments. Some of the game's dialogue was inspired by the British dark comedy series The End of the F***ing World (2017–2019). The notes scattered around the world were developed out of discussions with the team; as a level was built, the team would discuss the stories behind particular objects in the environment. The team decided to use Seattle as the game's primary location as its hilly nature and varied weather led to more interesting gameplay scenarios. Early in development, Sucker Punch Productions shared a 3D map of Seattle created for Infamous Second Son (2014) with Naughty Dog to help them understand the city's layout. Artists at Naughty Dog traveled to Seattle to analyze the architecture, vegetation, materials, topography, and lighting, and capture photorealistic textures. The team experimented with larger open world environments in Part II, as they had previously done with Uncharted 4 and The Lost Legacy. Druckmann wanted the open world of Seattle to contribute to Ellie feeling lost and frustrated. The final chapter of the game originally took place in Mexico before being moved to Santa Barbara, California.

== Character development ==
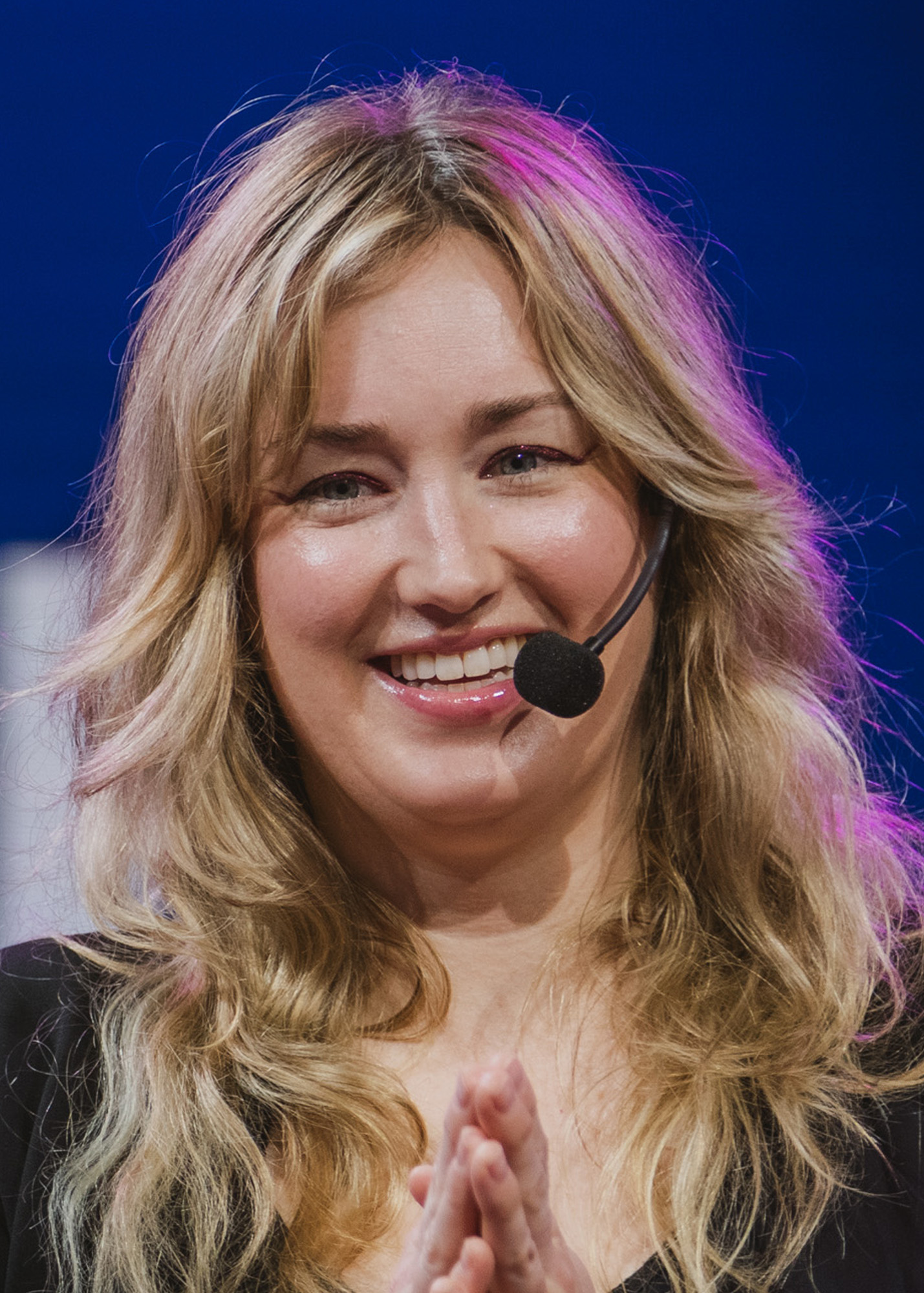
Ashley Johnson

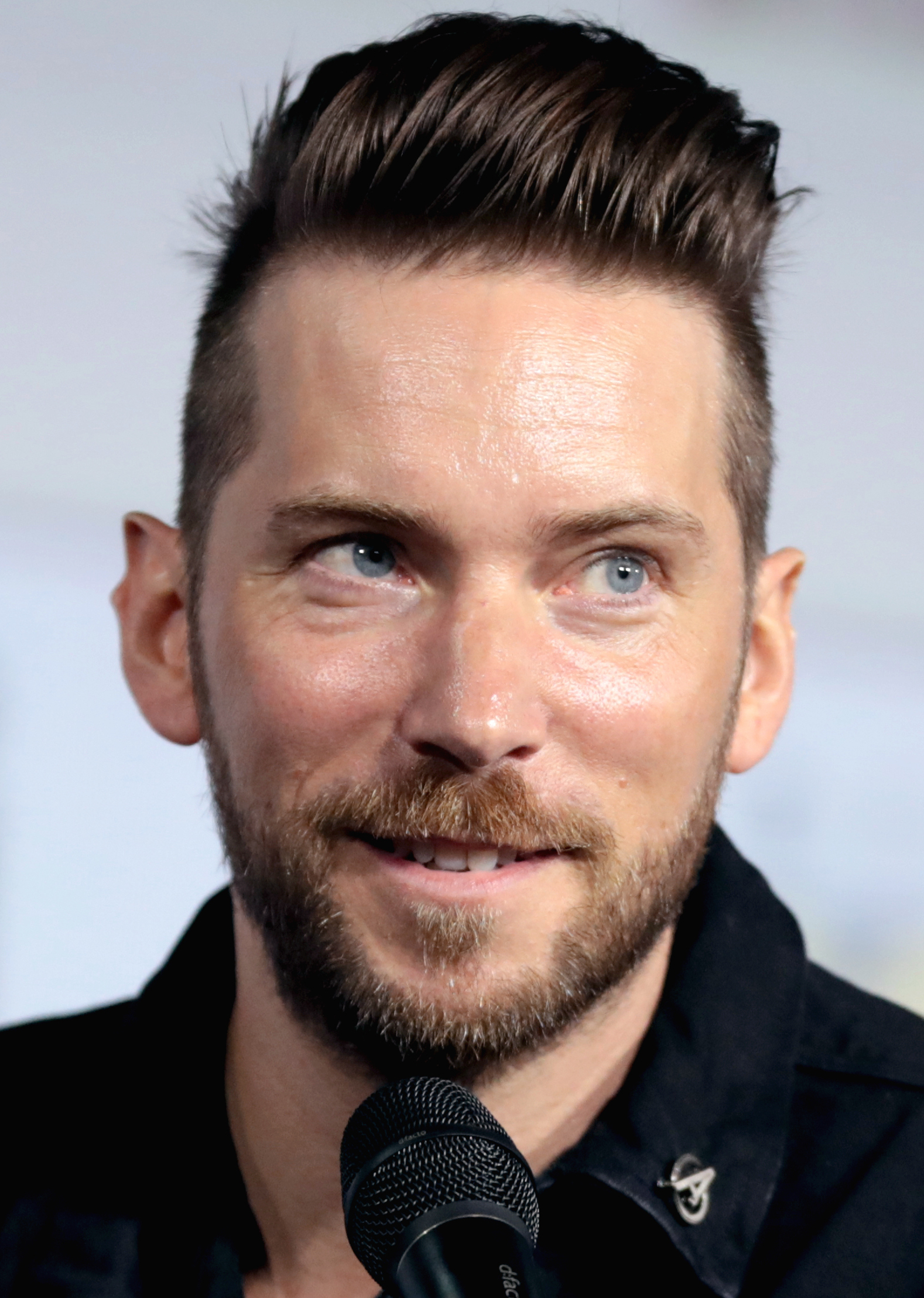
Troy Baker

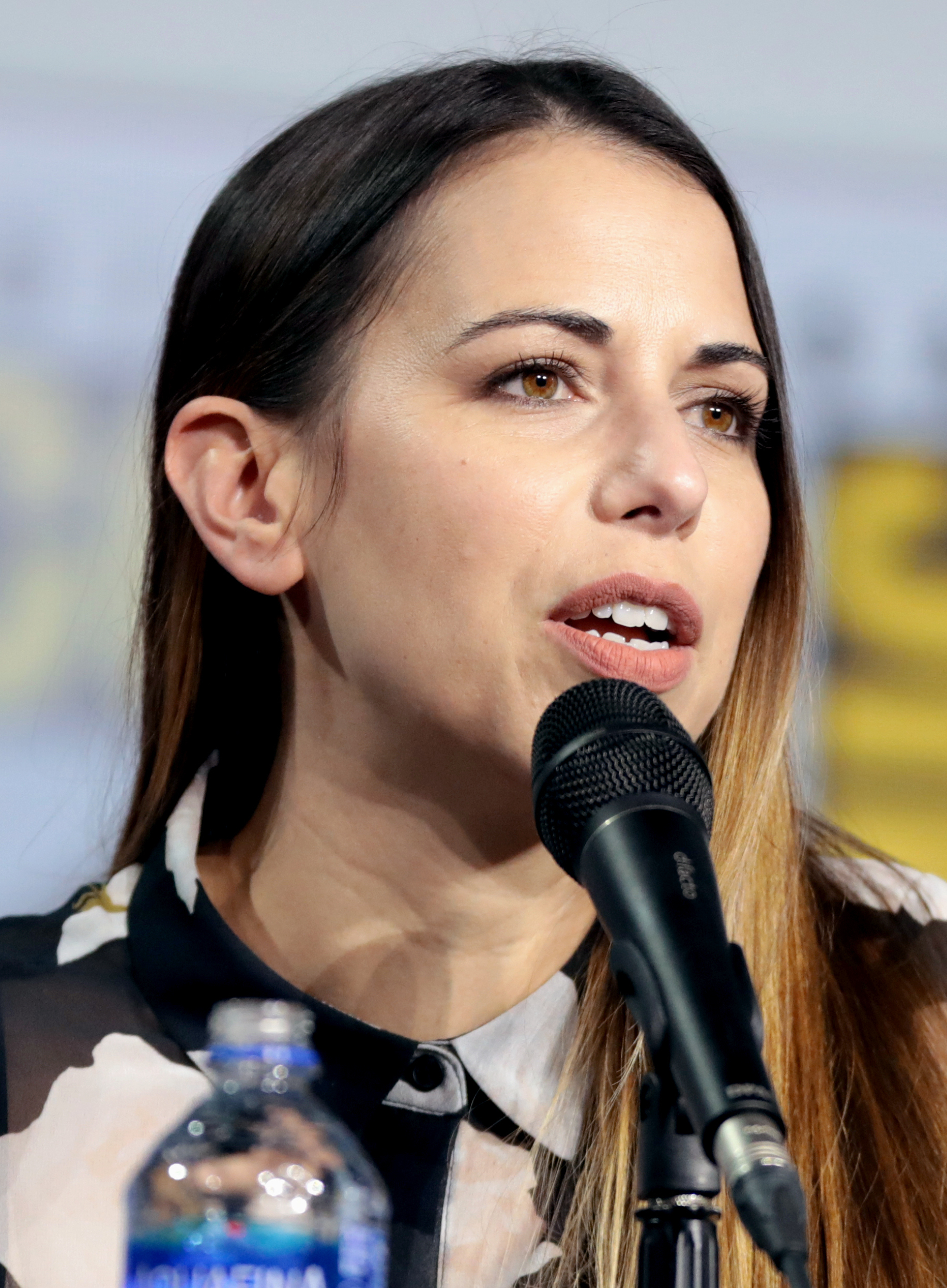
Laura Bailey

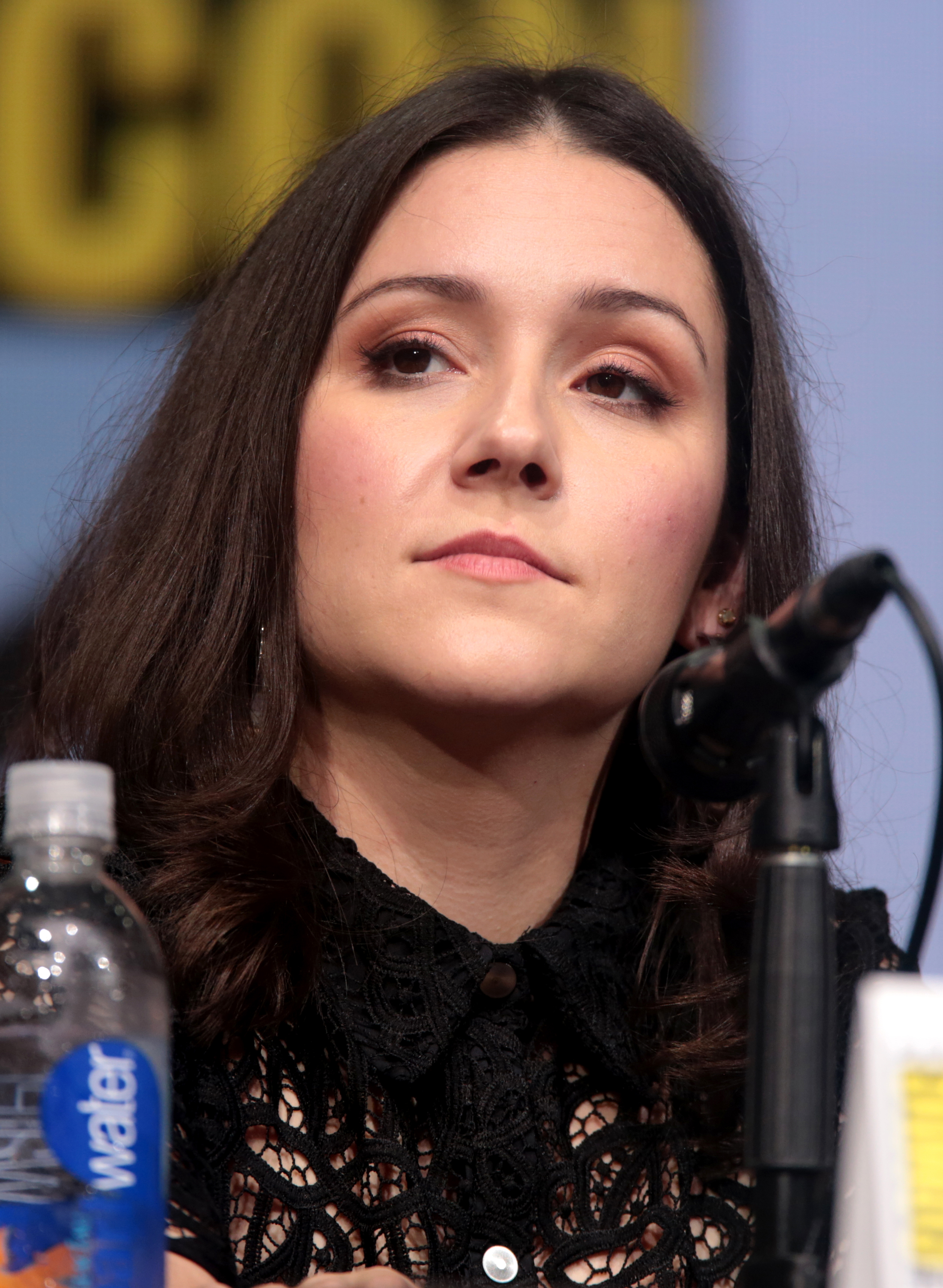
Shannon Woodward

Johnson and Baker reprise their roles as Ellie and Joel respectively, while Bailey and Woodward were cast as new characters Abby and Dina.

Ashley Johnson and Troy Baker reprise their roles as Ellie and Joel, respectively. Druckmann pitched the narrative to Johnson at a restaurant during early development of The Last of Us: Left Behind (2014), and to Baker after the 10th British Academy Games Awards. Druckmann recalled that Johnson's approval was the first feeling of validation for the narrative. The actors' performance were recorded at a studio in Playa Vista, Los Angeles using performance capture, recording motion and voice simultaneously. The actors wore motion capture suits and head-mounted cameras that track facial muscles and eye movements. Recording ran from 2017 to April 2019. The actors were allowed to improvise or suggest ideas while performing; Druckmann said that he would do "20 or 30 takes if need be". Gross noted that a goal of the writers was to "create the most multifaceted characters you've seen in games". She particularly wanted to explore the multifaceted behavior of Ellie, showing her power as well as her insecurities. She wanted the story to show that "there are no heroes or villains". Druckmann found that all three playable characters—Joel in the first game, and Ellie and Abby in Part II—mirror each other as they are all suffering with overcoming trauma and "quietening their demons".

Druckmann recalled the team's excitement to explore Ellie's character further as a protagonist, particularly developing the loss of her innocence, comparing it to the feeling of the writers of Breaking Bad (2008–2013) when given the opportunity to explore Walter White. The team discussed creating a sequel without Ellie and Joel, but felt that they were less interesting. For her portrayal as the primary playable character, Johnson took lessons she learned working with Baker on the first game. Johnson considered her own experiences with anxiety, and researched the effects of posttraumatic stress disorder (PTSD) with Druckmann. Ellie's excitement for astronomy was based on Johnson's own interests, while her obsession with comics is based on Druckmann's childhood.

Lead character artist Ashley Swidowski designed Ellie's eyes to demonstrate a somberness not present in the first game, which used wider eyes to reflect her childlike nature. Ellie's tattoo of a moth was designed by California-based artist Natalie Hall after the team struggled to settle on a design. Hall drew the tattoo on a developer's arm so the team could visualize it. When Swidowski added the moth design to Ellie's guitar, the team created a connection between it and the tattoo. Druckmann felt that moths' obsession with light mirrored Ellie's obsession throughout the game, as well as giving her a reminder of Joel. Ellie's clothing in the game is designed to wrinkle authentically. Ellie's journal was a late addition to development, intended to allow further insight into her mindset.

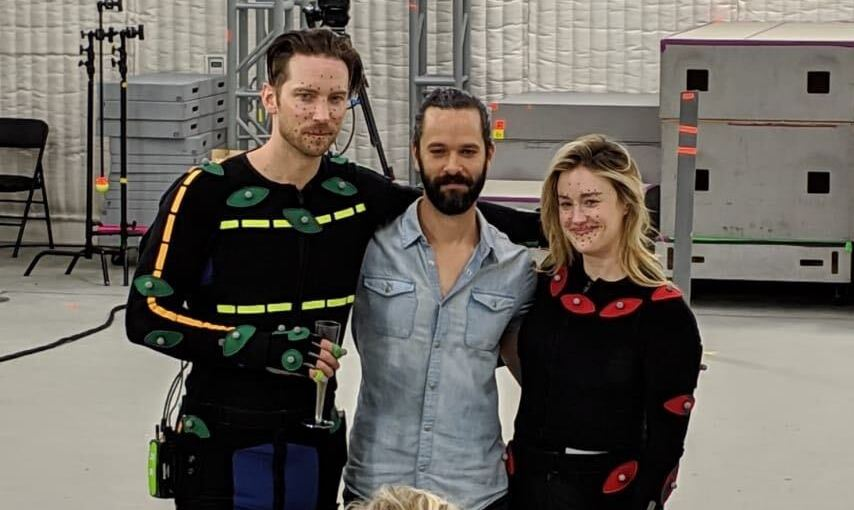
Baker, Druckmann, and Johnson on the final day of motion capture production

The game's flashback sequences of Ellie and Joel served as a way to contextualize the former's motivations and remind the player the reason behind her journey. The writers ensured that the flashbacks featured some conflict to avoid their relationship remaining idle; the writers felt that avoiding the consequences of Joel's actions at the end of the first game would be a "disservice" to the themes of Part II. Druckmann recalled that the flashbacks were "all over the place, out of order" initially, and that Gross's work on the game included their simplification. The dance scene between Ellie and Dina was originally the game's opening; once the writers realized that its placement would force the opening cutscene to be 25 minutes long, they moved it towards the end of the game as a flashback, where they felt it had a stronger impact. In the final flashback, Ellie and Joel originally hugged until Johnson suggested otherwise.

The change of player character from Ellie to Abby was inspired by the change from Joel to Ellie in the first game, though emphasized in Part II due to its focus on empathy. Druckmann found that players acted differently when forced to play as Ellie in the first game, and wanted to replicate a similar change with Abby in Part II. Druckmann was also inspired by the character switch of Metal Gear Solid 2: Sons of Liberty (2001), which had been suppressed in that game's marketing. The switch to Abby in the game's first chapter was done to demonstrate her personality and vulnerabilities and avoid her portrayal as a typical antagonist. The writers experimented with interspersing Ellie and Abby's gameplay sections, but ultimately settled on longer segments. Druckmann found that Ellie's attempt for revenge was mirrored by Abby, who had already achieved it by avenging her father. Early playtests of the final fight led to confusion regarding Ellie's decision to spare Abby; the editorial team suggested adding a flash of Joel playing guitar, which Druckmann felt was an effective balance between explicit and implicit motivation. For more than half of production, Ellie killed Abby in the game's conclusion, and would return to the farm and be tortured but spared by a relative of somebody Ellie killed. Druckmann felt that this was thematically relevant, but realized that it focused too heavily on the themes rather than characters; after conversations about Yara and Lev, they found that it felt dishonest and that Ellie still had some goodness. Druckmann wanted players to support both characters in the final fight, and realize how futile it is.

Gross felt that Ellie's decision to track down Abby was motivated by her desire to overcome her PTSD more than her desire to kill Abby. Gross, who has suffered twice from PTSD, considered it her responsibility to accurately depict the subject matter; she wanted players who might have suffered with trauma to understand that they are not alone. The writers wanted to deconstruct the perception of violence in Joel and Ellie: while Joel is indifferent and practical, Ellie kills to maintain a "culture of honor" by attaching violence to her ego. Some of the team considered Ellie's obsession with Abby akin to a drug addiction, and that Dina left as she felt that the obsession would never end. Gross considered the game's final shot, wherein Ellie leaves behind the guitar that Joel gave her, represented Ellie moving on from his death to a new chapter. Druckmann felt that it illustrated Ellie finally overcoming her ego, though he preferred that the player create their own interpretation.

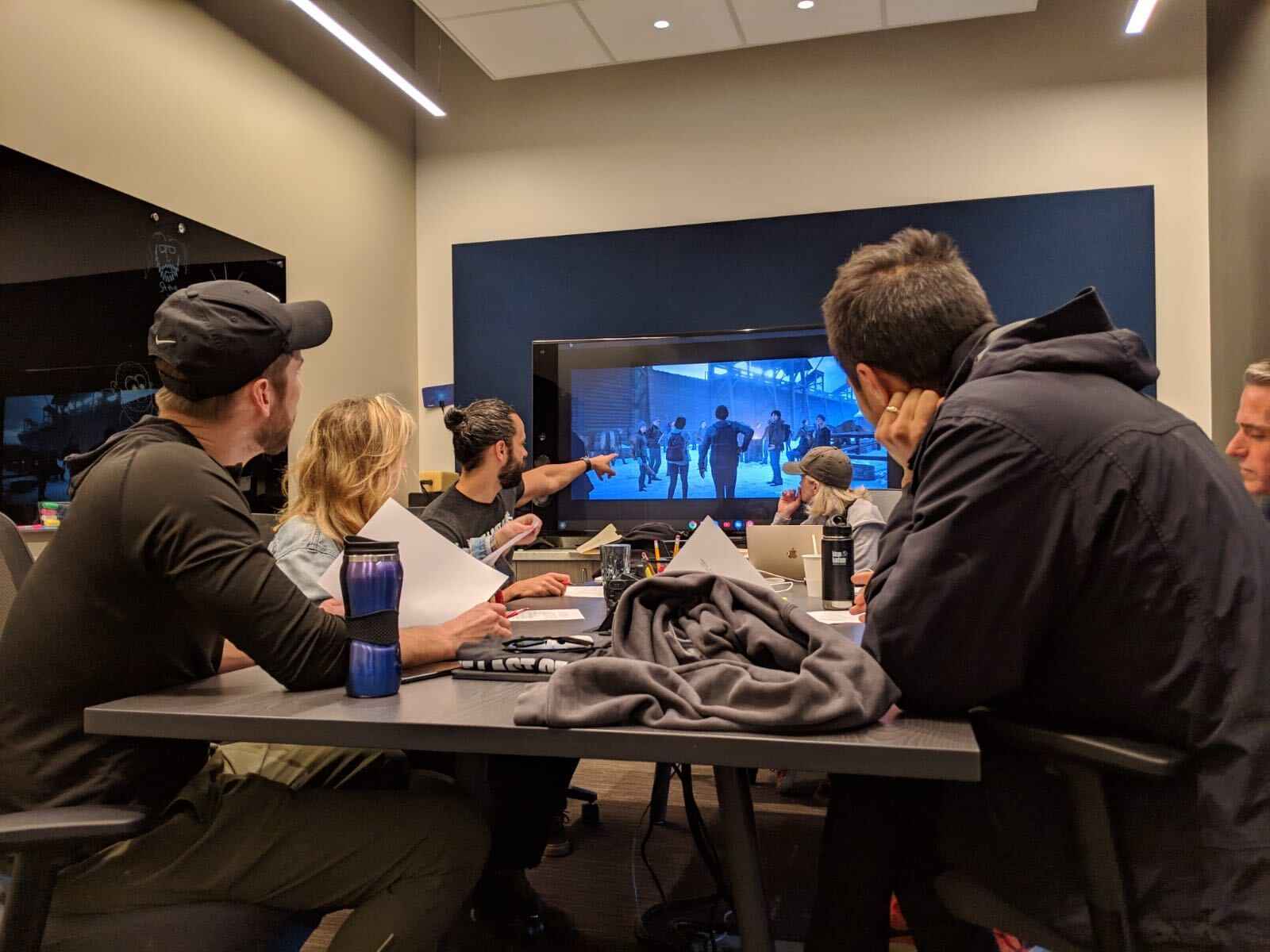
Writers and actors at a read-through before production

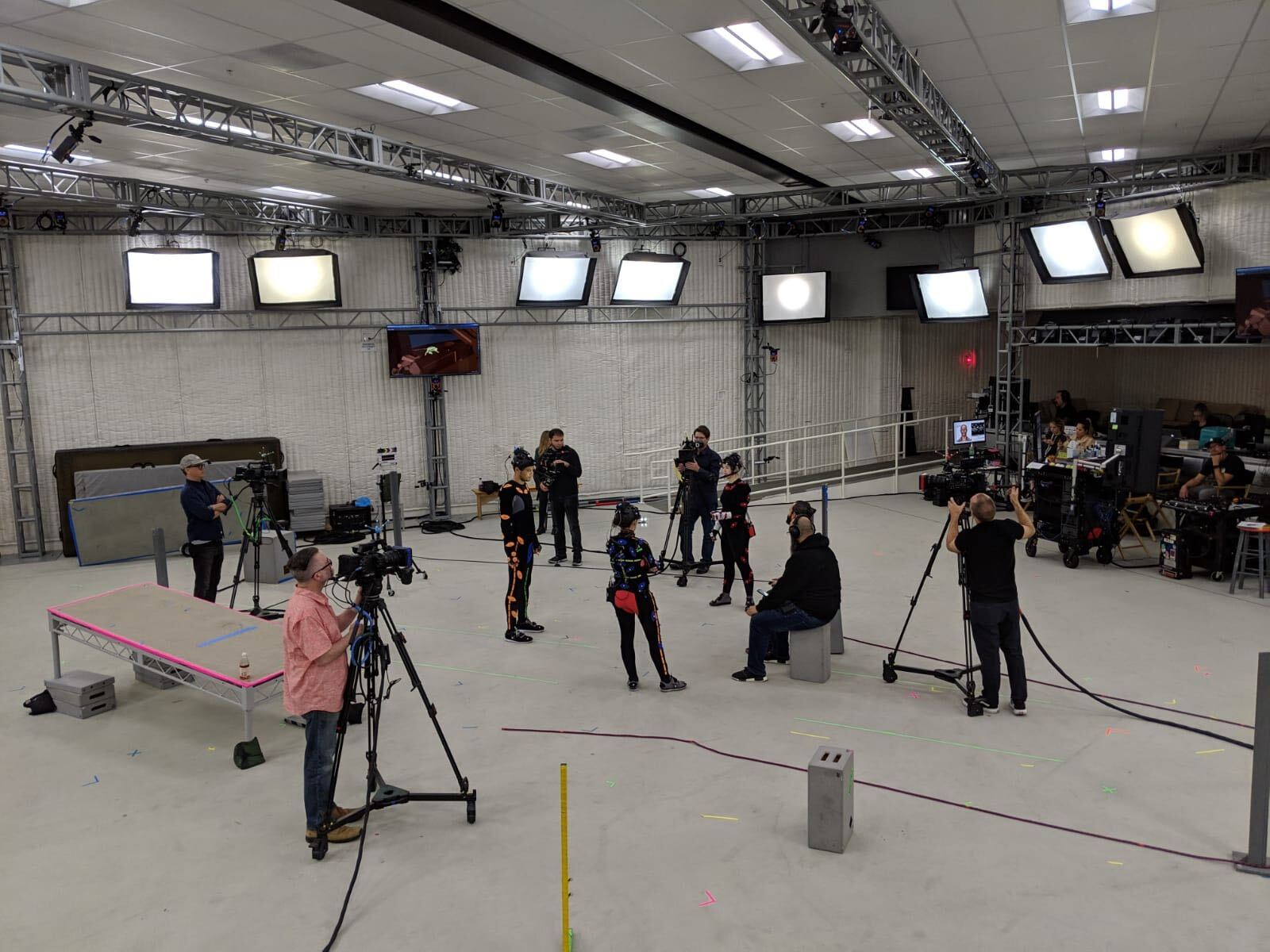
The game was recorded at a motion capture studio in Playa Vista, Los Angeles.

Druckmann felt that Joel's character arc was complete after the first game. Joel's death was a core part of the game's narrative structure from early in development; Druckmann considered it one of the most difficult to write, rehearse, and shoot. Though it initially caused some internal resistance, the team felt compelled when more of the narrative was built out. An early version of Joel's death scene had him utter "Sarah", his daughter's name, until Baker suggested that he should remain silent. While Sarah's death in the first game intended to evoke sadness, Joel's death aims to elicit anger. Ellie was originally absent during the scene, and was to be informed by Joel's brother Tommy, but Druckmann felt that witnessing the death through Ellie's perspective emphasized the anger of the player. He wanted it to be portrayed as "gross, unceremonious, and humiliating" instead of heroic; it was originally more gruesome, but later toned down as the gore was not crucial to the scene. He predicted that it might lead to negative reactions, but felt it was necessary to tell the story; he particularly felt that Naughty Dog's notability in the industry gave it the opportunity to take risks that other developers could not. In an earlier version of the scene, Abby stabbed Joel in the back and twisted the knife to paralyze him; however, as knives are more closely associated with Ellie, the team replaced it with a golf club to demonstrate Abby's blunt force attacks.

When auditioning actors for Abby, Druckmann specifically wanted to avoid casting Laura Bailey due to her proliferation of roles; he had originally considered Bailey to play Dina. When reviewing her audition tape, however, Druckmann was impressed by how Bailey had played into Abby's vulnerability, whereas other actors emphasized her anger. Bailey considers the game important to her personally, as she gave birth to her first son during production. Prior to her pregnancy, Bailey was working out in preparation for the role. She also prepared by researching people involved in wars and their coping mechanisms. An early iteration of the story had a young Abby witnessing an attack on her group by Joel and Tommy, who were hunters at the time (in the unseen 20 years of the first game), and vowing revenge. As the story and its theme of violence developed, the writers found it more interesting for Abby's father to have been killed by the player in the first game and directly tie into Joel's actions. Druckmann wanted players to hate Abby early in the game, but later empathize with her; he avoided writing her as a "perfect" character, instead prompting empathy through her flaws and redemptive actions.

Some of the game's flashback scenes with Abby initially depicted her joining the WLF, though it was an unconscious decision on her behalf, as the leader of the WLF was a fellow member of her former group and acted as a father figure for her. Abby's goal to kill Joel was fueled by her desire to return to a world before her father's death, but she discovers it impossible. After witnessing Owen's battle for light, she finds her own purpose in protecting Yara and Lev, which Druckmann felt mirrored Joel's redemption arc from the first game. The obstacles she overcomes when gathering medical supplies demonstrates the lengths to which she will go to help the children and redeem herself. Margenau felt that Abby was inspired to abandon her alliances after witnessing Lev's rebellious nature. Abby's plea to the Santa Barbara Rattlers to leave Lev alone is an intentional parallel with Ellie's plea to spare Joel earlier in the game. When Ellie holds Abby underwater in their final fight, Bailey held her breath while recording; she recalled that Johnson let her go when she saw Bailey's lips turning blue. Bailey felt that, in the game's conclusion, Abby understands Ellie's emotions, having dealt with her own father's death.

Gross connected actress Shannon Woodward, with whom she had worked on Westworld, with Druckmann. A fan of Westworld, Druckmann spoke with Woodward for several months before offering her an audition to play Dina. Johnson recalled that the team had narrowed the potential cast to around four actors. After testing with Woodward, Johnson felt that they immediately had chemistry; Woodward was later cast as the character. Woodward felt that some people deal with trauma through comedy, and would often improvise jokes while recording. As a narrative function, Dina represented the community of Jackson, and what Ellie stood to lose from her revenge mission. Her presence allowed Ellie moments of light. Gross had originally written an extended monologue for Ellie to perform to Dina about her fear of ruining their friendship.

Originally in development, Lev was not transgender. An early pitch was for Yara (portrayed by Victoria Grace) to be transgender, but Druckmann preferred to keep her a more traditional follower of the Seraphites. Queer and transgender employees of Naughty Dog gave input on the character, and the team consulted with an LGBTQ scholar. When the developers reached out to acting agencies to cast for the character, they found that none represented transgender actors. Some members of the team were fans of The OA (2016–2019), which starred Ian Alexander; though he was not represented by an agency at the time, Alexander was invited by Druckmann to audition. When exploring the idea of making Lev transgender, the team found it to be an interesting look into the violence that can be found within organized religion. Alexander was attracted to the role as he underwent similar emotions when transitioning, having come from a religious background and also receiving backlash after cutting his hair. He felt that Lev has been forced to grow up due to his surroundings. Despite some hesitation, the team determined that Lev's deadname being used by the Seraphites demonstrated the difference between their transphobia and Abby and Yara's acceptance. The team hired a religious consultant to ensure the Seraphites' response to Lev's transition was accurate without being unintentionally offensive. Druckmann considered Lev among the most important characters as he represents the same innocence that Ellie did in the first game.

== Technical and gameplay development ==
The development team began planning accessibility options early in development, including a high-contrast mode to assist with visualizing enemies and allies.

The developers pushed the technical capabilities of the PlayStation 4 when creating Part II, adding more enemies and larger environments than in previous games. Druckmann noted that any drops in detail would ruin the game's authenticity, which required consistent optimization of the technology. The team created a new animation technique called "motion mapping" for the characters, which allows for more realistic transitions between movement actions. The advancement of the game's artificial intelligence (AI) allowed for deeper connections with characters and the creation of bonds through gameplay. Enemy AI also have more complex understanding of the player's location at any given time. The additional animations required more significant amounts of data and motion capture performances than previously. Horses and dogs were motion captured for movement in the game.

The Last of Us Part II was originally planned as an open world game with hub worlds in Jackson and Seattle—the player would initially complete missions in Jackson as Abby before she revealed her true intentions, and later in Seattle as Ellie while she tracks down Abby—but the game transferred to a more linear style as it better served the narrative. An early idea had the player, as Ellie, track down Seattle targets in their desired order, allowing them to raid supplies from strangers; the latter concept was scrapped as the player choice did not match Ellie's character. Ellie's agility prompted the addition of new gameplay features, including puzzle and traversal sections, and more advanced dodging and stealth mechanics. Margenau wanted the new gameplay features to immerse the player in the world without feeling "gamey". The introduction of some gameplay elements, such as the tracking dogs and named enemies, was intended to create an emotional response. The team also emphasized the importance of Ellie's weapons to form a realistic attachment from the player, though Druckmann noted that the narrative tension was more important than the gameplay realism in some instances, such as the amount of enemies that Ellie kills. The glass-breaking mechanic was seen as a "big win" for development due to its technical difficulty and versatility for level design. Early prototypes included a companion dog for Ellie, who could fit under fences and fetch items.

Some scenes in the game, such as Owen and Mel's death from Ellie's perspective, were originally depicted as gameplay but later converted to non-interactive cutscenes to emphasize their impact. The dance scene between Ellie and Dina was originally interactive and more extensive, featuring sequences wherein the player could mix drinks, chase children, and interact with Cat, Ellie's ex-girlfriend, but the sequence was eventually cut for narrative purposes. Ellie and Dina's kiss was one of the most demanding scenes to animate. It was recorded in two ways: without the face camera helmets so the actors could kiss, and kissing the air with the helmets so the animators had a reference for the facial movement. Lead cinematic animator Eric Baldwin said that the minute details that had to be implemented in the graphics software Autodesk Maya included dynamic hair strands and cheek flushness.

In Part II, Naughty Dog wanted to increase the accessibility options introduced in Uncharted 4 to ensure that all players could complete the story. The developers attended conferences and worked with advocates like Brandon Cole and Can I Play That? media editor Steve Saylor during the process. The game has around 60 accessibility options, including audio clues, visual aids, and customizable controls. The team began planning the features during early production, which game designer Matthew Gallant felt was the reason they added so many; in particular, high-contrast mode, customizable controls, and text-to-speech required the most resources. The designers ensured that the game's tone and themes remained consistent with the accessibility options enabled. Schatz found the visual options particularly challenging due to the spectrum of visual impairments. When a developer suggested an accessibility option to censor the violence against dogs, Druckmann refused as it would impact the narrative too heavily. He felt that including an option to censor gore would lessen the discomfort intended by the story. Members of the team worked extra hours to ensure the addition of the accessibility options, despite Druckmann instructing them otherwise.

== Music production ==
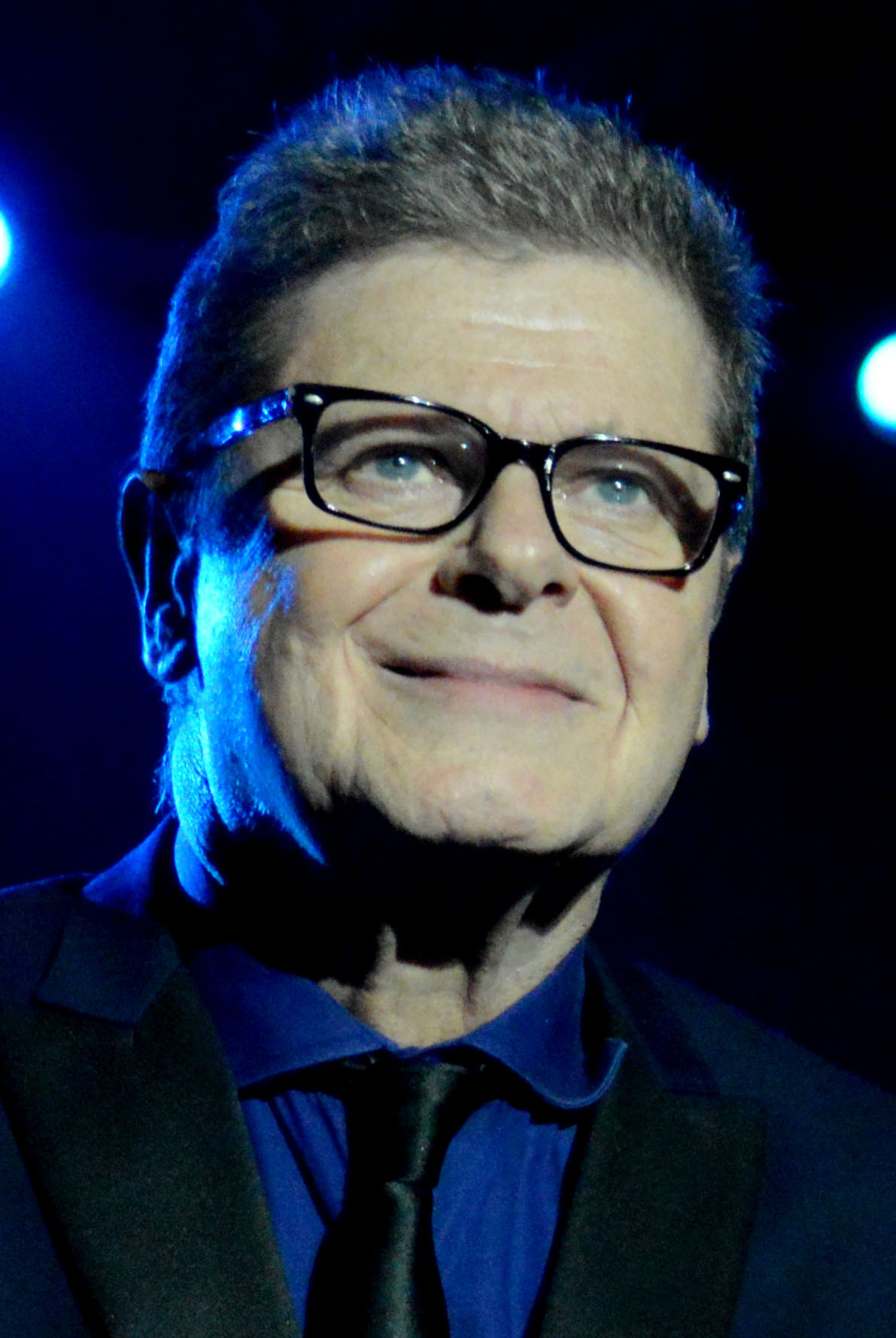
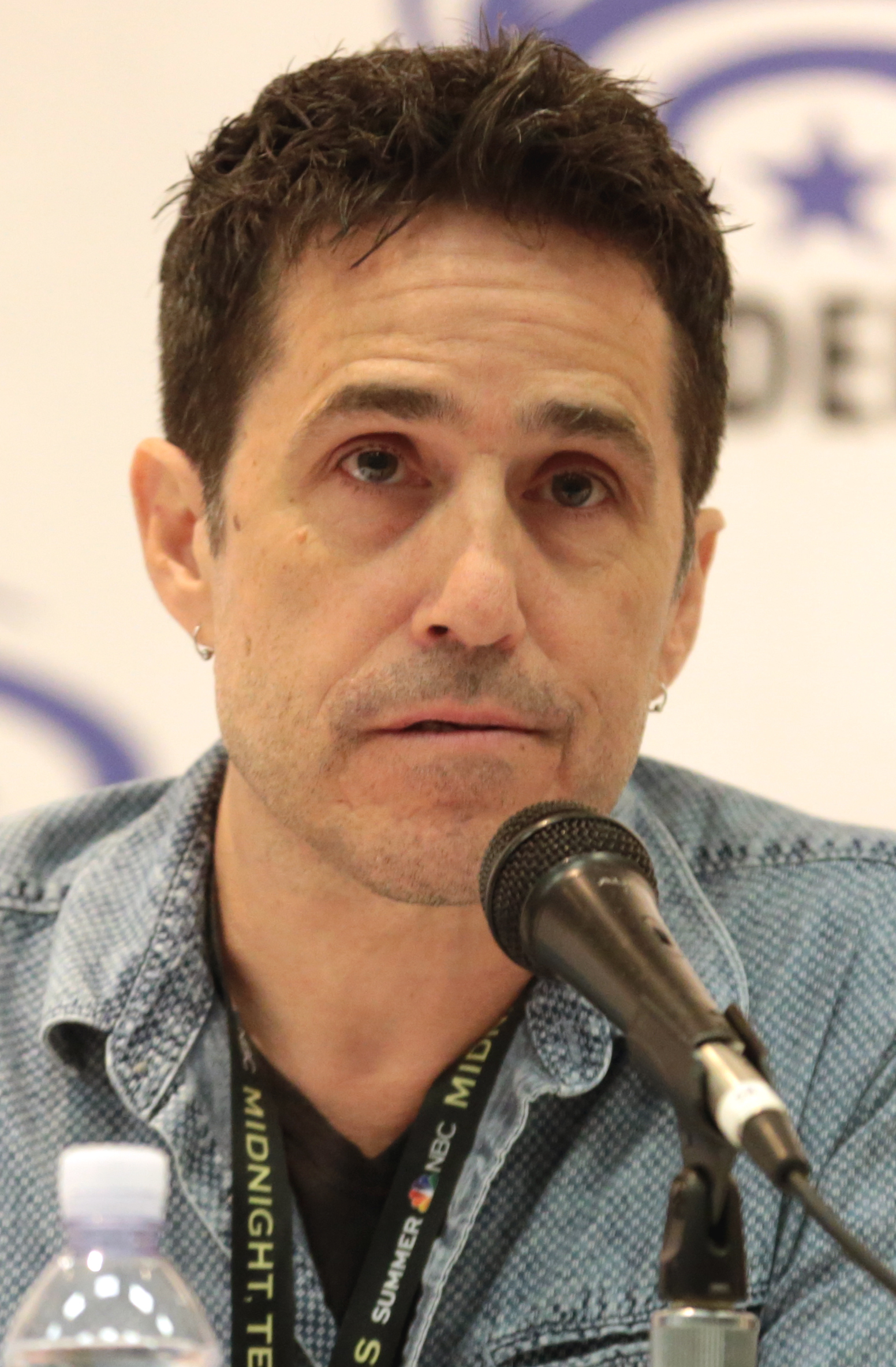
Gustavo Santaolalla (left) returned to compose the score for The Last of Us Part II, while Mac Quayle (right) provided additional combat music.

Gustavo Santaolalla returned to compose and perform the score, as he had done with the first game. He was tasked with creating the emotional, character-based tracks. Santaolalla worked on the game for two to three years. He created music based on Druckmann's story pitch and they fit the music into the scenes later, occasionally requiring minor rewrites. Santaolalla wanted to maintain and extend the first game's motifs while introducing new elements. He felt his approach in composing had not changed as the themes of love and hate were linked: the latter a deformation of the former. Santaolalla continued using the ronroco, his signature instrument used in the first game's theme, as he felt it enhanced Ellie's qualities through feminine sounds, while he introduced a banjo for Abby's theme. He composed Part II's score around the banjo and an electric guitar, feeling the increased characters and complexities demanded more timbre. He felt the banjo reflected the game's American setting and origin and his spontaneous use imparted a "searching, reflective, pensive" feeling.

Mac Quayle was hired in early 2018 to create the combat music. The developers were familiar with his work on the television series Mr. Robot. Quayle bought a PlayStation 4 and The Last of Us to familiarize himself with the series. He began writing ideas in May 2018 and delivered final music in January 2020; he found the deadlines more relaxed than film and television. Though they discussed potentially sharing stems and sessions, Santaolalla and Quayle's collaborations were minimal; they performed a three-day recording session in PlayStation's offices in October 2018, experimenting to create "grooves and textures". Quayle attributed their similarities to the developers "really knowing what they wanted". Quayle's music aimed to represent the gameplay's "relentless tension", consistently moving the action forward and heightening suspense and anxiety. Quayle was provided with videos of early gameplay for inspiration. He used Logic Pro to manipulate the live acoustic instruments, of which his favorite were the bass guitar and cello; he brought in a professional cellist for the latter.

The in-game covers became a significant part of the characters and their development, namely Ellie with her guitar. Druckmann found that Ellie's guitar-playing allowed her access to memories and emotions; when she loses her fingers in the game's conclusion, it serves to sever ties to her memories and relationships. The song "Future Days" by Pearl Jam acts as a theme between Ellie and Joel throughout the game. The song was previously featured as part of One Night Live in an unbroadcast epilogue wherein Joel plays the song to Ellie. According to Druckmann, Sony was doubtful that Naughty Dog would receive permission to use the song; the band's manager agreed after hearing the story pitch, receiving a PlayStation 4 and a copy of the original game, and an advanced screening of a trailer. Although the song's album Lightning Bolt was released two weeks after the onset of the in-game outbreak in September 2013, Druckmann recalled seeing a live performance of the song several months earlier in July, and felt that its inclusion was realistic.

Shawn James was contacted by Sony in mid-2014 for permission to create a cover of his song "Through the Valley" for an upcoming game; James was unaware of how it would be used until he watched the game's first trailer at the PlayStation Experience in December 2016. Druckmann had specifically enjoyed the song and felt that it aligned with the game's darkness and emotion. The song went viral after the trailer's release, charting atop the Spotify viral charts in the United Kingdom. Naughty Dog was able to secure permission to use "Take On Me" by A-ha in one of the game's scenes due to Gross's friendship with Lauren Savoy, the wife of A-ha guitarist Paul Waaktaar-Savoy. Druckmann found that the song's lyrics addressed the game's themes in a lighthearted manner. He felt that the scene featuring the song being optional made it feel more important to the player, though the team considered making it unmissable instead. After Johnson worked with vocal coach Melissa Reese, the team felt that her singing was too refined, and asked her to consciously sing worse.

== Sound design ==
A sound designer at Naughty Dog created a system that tracks the player character's level of exertion and plays matching respiratory audio effects. To create the sound effects for the Shambler, sound designer Beau Anthony Jimenez made a palatal clicking noise into a padded bucket via a tube, which he recorded with an ultrasonic microphone. He added this atop a slowed-down palatal sound to create the "Shambler Bark". Voice actors Raul Ceballos and Steve Blum contributed to the Shambler sounds, the former to screams and the latter to grunts. The explosion sounds were created by squeezing grapefruit and expanding a life jacket; for additional texture, he filled a bellows with oatmeal and blew it. The audio of the resulting acid cloud was achieved by dripping water on a pilot light and melting ice over a hot pan.

The whistling of the Seraphites was a long-discussed element of the game; production began in early 2018 in preparation for an upcoming demonstration. The team originally referenced whistled languages such as Sfryria and Silbo Gomero but found that they were more sophisticated than necessary. They also worked with a professional whistler but found the result too "birdlike". Dialogue supervisor Maged Khalil and UI artist Maria Capel recorded around an hour of sample whistles, which dialogue coordinator Grayson Stone organized into 14 groups dependent on duration, trill, intensity, and tone. After some iteration, the team decided on 26 categories, each representing lines the Seraphites use to communicate. Actors Stevie Mack and Lisa Marie provided the final whistles in three styles, each in a different level of quality. The team wanted the subtitles to represent the nuance of the whistles without giving away their exact meaning, and consulted accessibility specialist Morgan Baker to create them. The team discussed adding additional communication methods, such as knocking on trees or rattling, but it would have required additional animation, art, and sound design work.

== Release ==
The Last of Us Part II was announced at the PlayStation Experience event on December 3, 2016. At E3 2018, Druckmann said that Naughty Dog was refusing to announce a release date until the game was "very close to release", to avoid disappointing fans. During Sony's State of Play presentation on September 24, 2019, Naughty Dog revealed that the game would be released on February 21, 2020. A month later, on October 25, Druckmann announced that the game was delayed to May 29, 2020, to "bring the entire game up to a level of polish we would call Naughty Dog quality". On April 2, 2020, Sony announced that the game was almost complete but had been indefinitely delayed due to logistical problems caused by the COVID-19 pandemic. The team used the additional time for further polishing. In late April, several videos leaked online, showing cutscenes, gameplay, and significant plot details. Druckmann tweeted that he was "heartbroken" for fans and for the team, who had devoted years to development. A few days later, Sony stated that it had identified the leakers and that they were not affiliated with Sony or Naughty Dog. According to Schreier, hackers had used a security weakness in a previous Naughty Dog game to penetrate the company's servers. On April 27, Sony announced a new release date of June 19, 2020. A performance update for the game was released on May 19, 2021, allowing gameplay at 60 frames per second on the PlayStation 5.

== Promotion ==
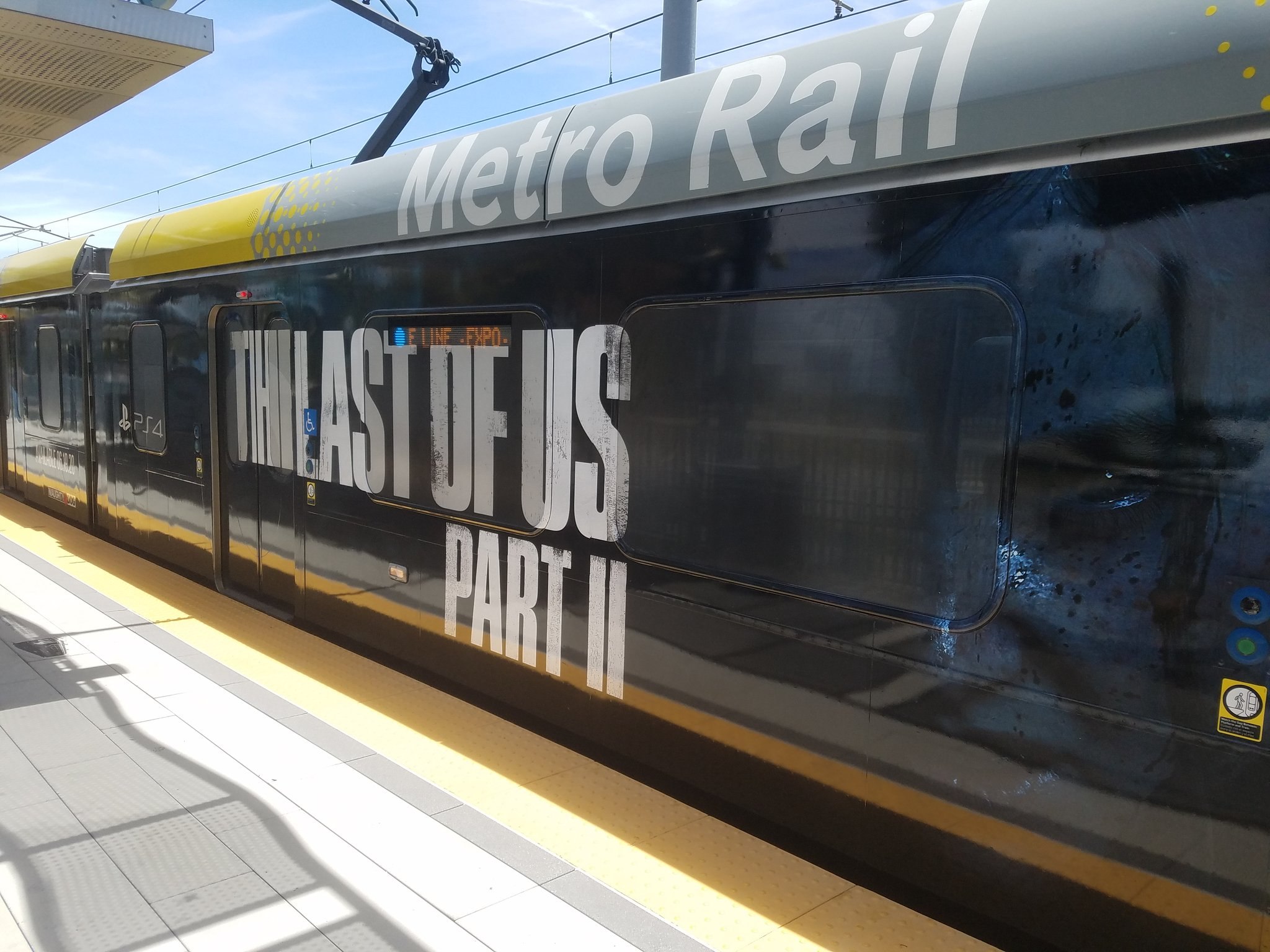
Marketing for the game on a train in Santa Monica, California

The game was extensively marketed through video trailers. The first trailer was released alongside the game's announcement, showcasing the return of Ellie and Joel, and featured a cover of Shawn James's "Through the Valley" by Johnson. The trailer was named the Best Cinematic of 2016 by Behind the Cinematic. At PlayStation Experience in December 2016, Game Informer's Andy McNamara moderated a panel with Druckmann, Johnson, and Baker. The second trailer was released in October 2017 as a part of Paris Games Week. It revealed Abby, Yara, and Lev. Druckmann stated that the characters "are integral to [Ellie and Joel's] next journey". While the trailer was well-received, it drew some criticism for its violence. IGN's Max Scoville felt that the trailer was "a little out of touch" for introducing characters entirely through violence and without context. Sony Interactive Entertainment Europe president Jim Ryan defended the trailer, saying the game is made by and for adults. Druckmann explained: "We're making a game about the cycle of violence and we're making a statement about violent actions and the impact they have ... [the idea] was for the player to feel repulsed by some of the violence they are committing themselves."

At PlayStation Experience in December 2017, Hannah Hart moderated a panel with Druckmann, Gross, Johnson, Baker, Bailey, Alexander, and Grace; Johnson and Baker opened the panel with a performance of "The Wayfaring Stranger". The game was featured at Sony's E3 event in June 2018, revealing Dina and Jesse. The kiss between Ellie and Dina in the presentation was praised for appearing passionate and believable, a feat frequently considered difficult to animate. Critics also praised the improved graphics, enemy artificial intelligence, and combat. Druckmann recalled that the team rehearsed and choreographed the gameplay within the presentation, particularly due to the openness of the level. E3 Coliseum hosted a panel for the game in, moderated by IGN's Lucy O'Brien and featuring Druckmann, Newman, Margenau, Johnson, and Woodward.

Another trailer was featured in Sony's State of Play presentation in September 2019, followed by some additional marketing to celebrate Outbreak Week—the week in which the fictional outbreak occurred in the original game—including hands-on demonstrations for journalists, behind-the-scenes videos, and merchandise announcements. In the same week, Naughty Dog also announced the special edition versions of the game: the Digital Deluxe Edition features a digital soundtrack, art book, and dynamic theme; the Collector's Edition include the same, as well as a SteelBook case, physical art book, bracelet, and a statue of Ellie; and the Ellie Edition also include a replica of Ellie's backpack and a vinyl record featuring some music from the game.

The game's story trailer was released on May 6. From May 13 to June 3, Naughty Dog released a series of videos about the development of Part II, discussing the narrative, gameplay, and world. The game was featured in its own standalone State of Play presentation on May 27, revealing an extended gameplay demonstration. An animated commercial was released on June 3, featuring Ellie singing an acoustic cover of "True Faith", a song by New Order. The cover is specifically inspired by the version by Lotte Kestner, though she was not credited; when Kestner reached out to Naughty Dog, Druckmann issued an apology and ensured proper credit. The final pre-launch trailer was released on June 10. Druckmann claimed that Sony's marketing department wanted less secrecy surrounding the narrative, but he was unwilling to reveal twists to players. Naughty Dog replaced and altered characters in the trailers to conceal story events; Druckmann cited the marketing of Metal Gear Solid 2: Sons of Liberty, which concealed its protagonist in trailers, as an influence. For the game's launch, PlayStation Australia posted a cover of "Through the Valley" by Tash Sultana.

The game received several pieces of merchandise, including clothing, a Funko Pop, and a replica of Ellie's guitar. Sony also released PlayStation 4 hardware and accessories branded with the game's logo and art, including a PlayStation 4 Pro, DualShock 4 controller, wireless headset, and Seagate hard drive. The Art of The Last of Us Part II, a 200-page book featuring art and concepts from the game, was released in June 2020. Following the release, several developers and cast members promoted the game through appearances on online talk shows and podcasts. The Official The Last of Us Podcast, hosted by Christian Spicer and published by Sony, began covering the game from its sixth episode in July 2020, featuring interviews with the cast and developers. For The Last of Us Day (Note: Formerly known as Outbreak Day but changed in 2020 due to the impact of the COVID-19 pandemic) in September 2020, Naughty Dog announced new merchandise for the game, including a vinyl soundtrack, board game, statues, and posters. A trailer focusing on Abby's story and gameplay was released on December 3, 2020. For the game's first anniversary in June 2021, new clothing and merchandise was revealed, including a statue of Abby in collaboration with Dark Horse Direct. In August 2022, Naughty Dog announced a partnership with Chivas Brothers to create a whisky based on The Last of Us Part II called Moth & Wolf (resembling Ellie's tattoo and Abby's faction, respectively). A 2013 vintage—representative of the first game's release—the whisky, which sits at 40 percent alcohol by volume, carries notes of vanilla to represent the safety of Jackson, and smoke and malt to imitate the toughness of Seattle. Preorders opened in October. The game's script was published in a book by Dark Horse Books in December 2025.

== Remastered ==
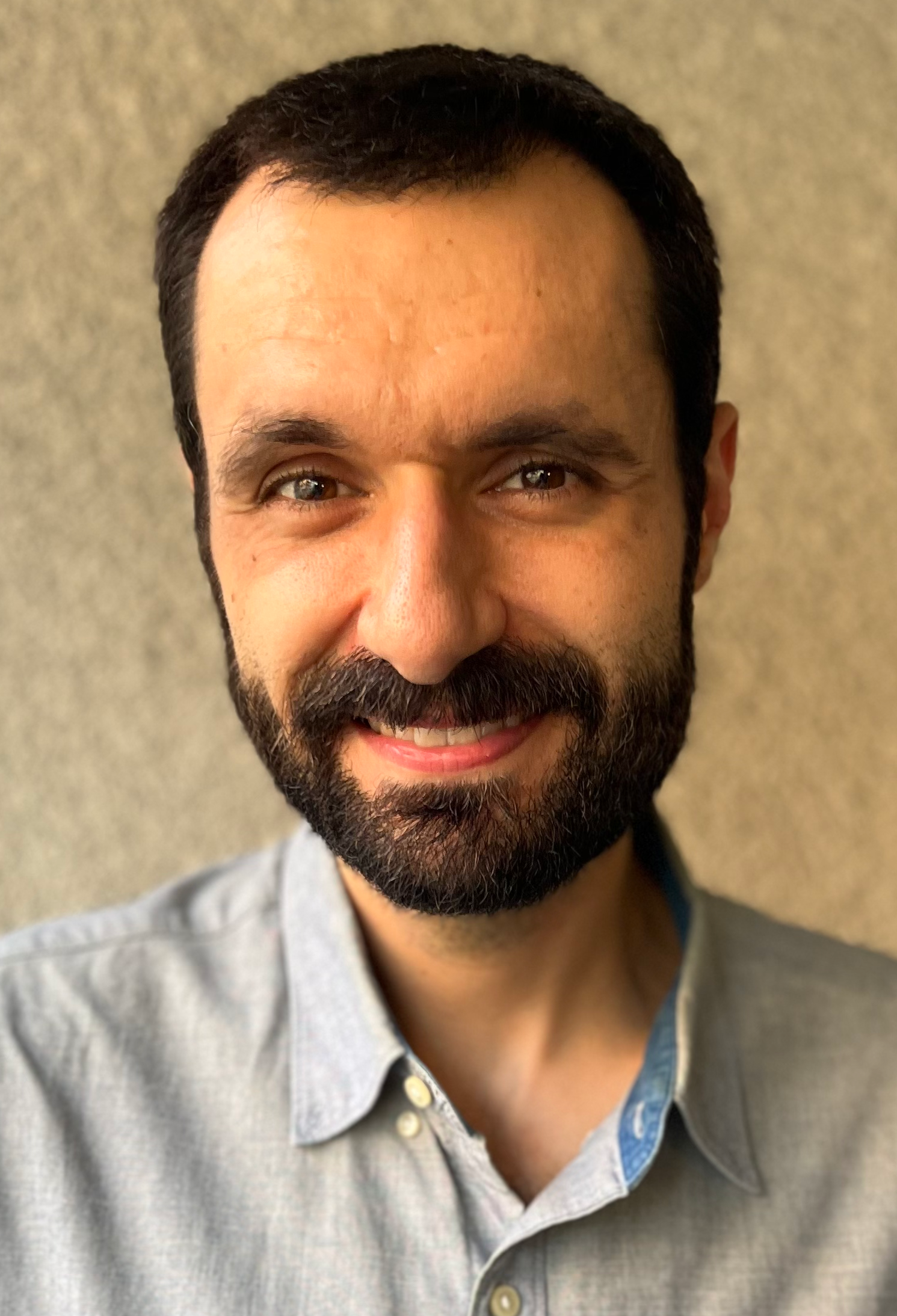
Matthew Gallant served as game director on The Last of Us Part II Remastered.

In November 2023, following a PlayStation Store listing leak, Naughty Dog announced a remastered version of the game, titled The Last of Us Part II Remastered. It features visual improvements, faster loading times, DualSense integration, audio descriptions, and an audio commentary with Druckmann, Gross, Johnson, Baker, and Bailey. New gameplay modes include Guitar Free Play, featuring playable characters Ellie, Joel, and Gustavo (modeled after Santaolalla) in several locations with unlockable guitars like a banjo; Lost Levels, featuring three scrapped and incomplete gameplay sequences with an introduction by Druckmann and commentary by designers Pete Ellis and Banun Idris; and No Return, a roguelike survival mode featuring randomized combat encounters. A July 2025 update added a chronological mode, intertwining Ellie and Abby's stories; the team was curious to view the story in chronological order akin to an option in the home media release of Memento (2000).

Remastered was released for the PlayStation 5 on January 19, 2024. A special edition version, including a SteelBook case, trading cards, patch, and pins, was made available in some regions. According to Video Games Chronicle's Jordan Middler, Remastered's development was used to familiarize newly hired employees with the process, while Druckmann led a team on full production of a new game. Druckmann, Margenau, and Newman mentored Remastered's game director Matthew Gallant through development. Gallant felt the amount of additional content justified Remastered's development, and Druckmann compared it to a Criterion Collection release. The latter was working on the second season of the television adaptation during Remastered's development, which he felt provided an opportunity to revisit the narrative's intricacies and analyze story decisions. Remastered was updated in October 2024 to target higher resolutions and frame rates on the PlayStation 5 Pro.

The team was inspired to develop No Return after exploring all other additions, and took inspiration from other roguelike games, which Gallant felt had a "renaissance" in the preceding five years, citing games like Dead Cells (2018), Hades (2020), and Cult of the Lamb (2022). While the game's combat is generally developed to service the story, the team wanted a mode to focus on combat to demonstrate its systems. They considered that No Return could trivialize the narrative's violence, but felt it was separate enough to justify inclusion and should only be played after the story. Gallant found the omission of checkpoints in the No Return added additional tension not present in the story, comparing it to his experience in Deathloop (2021) which prevented his ability to savescum and made gameplay more memorable, resulting in improvisation leading to "either a memorable defeat or a hard fought comeback". The mode's character and weapon options were prompted by different combat styles, such as Lev and his bow for stealth players. Gallant wanted the randomized weapons to prompt players to use items they otherwise neglected, and the randomized encounters and modifications to place them in unfamiliar scenarios.

At the Game Awards in December 2024, Naughty Dog announced the Windows version of Remastered, developed in collaboration with Nixxes Software and Iron Galaxy. New content (Note: The new content for Remastered includes two characters (Bill and Marlene) and four maps for No Return, and a new skin for Ellie featuring Jordan A. Mun's jacket from Intergalactic: The Heretic Prophet.) was added to the PlayStation 5 version in tandem with the Windows release on April 3, 2025. The release was targeted at fans of the television series who did not own the original game or a console. The team underwent extensive testing and prototyping when implementing the new content, ensuring the No Return characters stood out and the maps provided interesting encounters. The team felt they were skilled at targeting PlayStation consoles but not other platforms, prompting them to engage Nixxes for the Windows port; head of technology Travis McIntosh considered the lack of loading screens to be one of Nixxes's greatest contributions. The developers at Nixxes aimed for effective scalability, wanting the medium graphical settings to reflect the PlayStation 4 Pro version while the high settings exceed the PlayStation 5.
