= Rat king =

Collection of intertwined rats

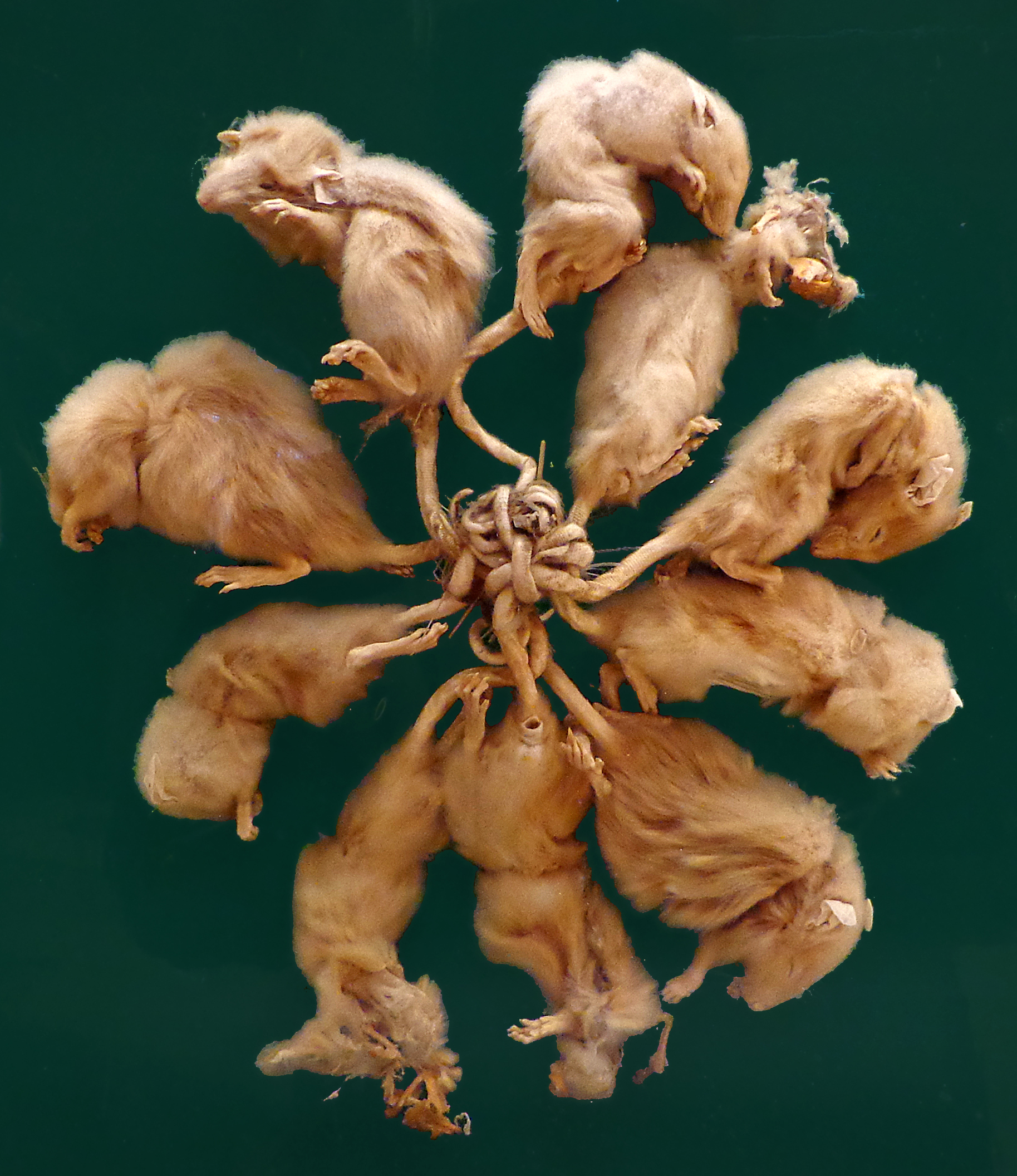
Rat king found in 1895 in Dellfeld, Germany, now in the Musée zoologique de la ville de Strasbourg, France

A rat king is a collection of rats (or mice) whose tails are intertwined and bound together in some way. This could be a result of an entangling material like hair, a sticky substance such as sap or gum, or the tails being tied together.

A similar phenomenon with squirrels has been observed, which has had modern documented examples.

== Etymology ==
The original German term, Rattenkönig, was calqued into English as rat king, and into French as roi des rats. The term was not originally used in reference to actual rats, but for persons who lived off others. Conrad Gesner in Historia animalium (1551–58) stated: "Some would have it that the rat waxes mighty in its old age and is fed by its young: this is called the rat king." Martin Luther stated: "finally, there is the Pope, the king of rats right at the top." Later, the term referred to a king sitting on a throne of knotted tails.

An alternative theory states that the name in French was rouet de rats (or a spinning wheel of rats, the knotted tails being wheel spokes), with the term transforming over time into roi des rats, because formerly French oi was pronounced [we] or similar; nowadays it is pronounced [wa].

== History ==
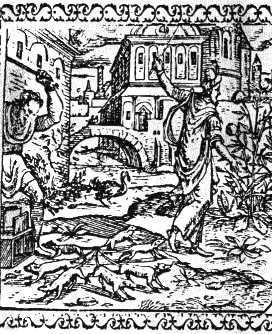
Rat king depicted in 16th-century woodcut

The earliest report of rat kings comes from 1564. Most extant examples are formed from black rats (Rattus rattus).

Specimens of purported rat kings are kept in some museums. The museum Mauritianum in Altenburg, Thuringia, shows the largest well-known mummified "rat king", which was found in 1828 in a miller's fireplace at Buchheim. It consists of 32 rats. Alcohol-preserved rat kings are shown in museums in Hamburg, Göttingen, Hamelin, Stuttgart, Strasbourg, Tartu, and Nantes.

A rat king found in 1930 in New Zealand, displayed in the Otago Museum in Dunedin, was composed of immature black rats whose tails were entangled by horse hair.

A rat king discovered in 1963 by a farmer at Rucphen, Netherlands, as published by cryptozoologist M. Schneider, consists of seven rats. All of them were killed by the time they were examined. X-ray images show formations of calluses at the fractures of their tails, which suggests that the animals survived for an extended period of time with their tails tangled.

Sightings of the phenomenon in modern times, especially where the specimens are alive, are very rare. One 2005 sighting comes from an Estonian farmer in Saru, of the Võrumaa region; many of the rats in the specimen, now part of the collection at the University of Tartu Museum of Zoology in Estonia, were alive. In 2021, a living "rat king" of five mice was caught on video (and untangled to save the mice) near Stavropol, Russia.

On 20 October 2021, a live rat king of 13 rats was found in Põlvamaa, Estonia. The rat king was taken to Tartu University and euthanized due to the rats having no way of freeing themselves. Before that, scientists were able to film the rat king alive. The rat king will be added to Tartu University's Natural History Museum.

== Possible explanations ==
Rat kings have been reported from Germany, Belgium (particularly in the vicinity of the border with the Netherlands), Poland, Estonia, Indonesia (Java), and New Zealand, with the majority of cases reported from the European countries. The existence of this phenomenon was debated due to the limited evidence of it occurring naturally, although the discovery of a live instance in Estonia in 2021 is considered to be proof that it is a natural, albeit extremely rare, phenomenon. Another concern is the possibility that some of the centuries-old preserved museum specimens could be fabricated, such hoaxes being common in earlier eras. 17th–18th-century naturalists proposed many hypotheses to explain this phenomenon. Most were dubious, ranging from the rats getting stuck together during birth and glued later, to healthy rats deliberately knotting themselves to weaker rats to make a nest. A possible explanation is that the long flexible tail of the black rat could be exposed to sticky or frozen substances such as sebum (a secretion from the skin itself), sap, food, or feces. This mixture acts as a bonding agent and may solidify as rats sleep especially when the animals live in proximity during winter. After realizing that they were bound, they would struggle, tightening the knot. This explanation is plausible given that most cases have been found during winter and in confined spaces. Emma Burns, curator of natural science at the Otago Museum, said regarding her museum's specimen, "Ship rats [black rats], according to some theories, are climbing rats, so their tails have a grasping reflex. In the nest, they form a hold."

Some zoologists remain skeptical, saying that, while theoretically possible, the rats would not be able to survive in such a condition for a long time, particularly if the temperatures rose or if they bit their own or another's tail to try to free themselves. Since black rats cluster together during winters for warmth, it is possible for a rat king to occur naturally. Any fabrications would most likely have been created using dead rats, given how difficult the process would be if the rats were alive. However, experts support the idea of isolated freak accidents due to the existence of occasional well-observed cases involving squirrels—also members of the rodent family. A 2007 study published in Proceedings of the Estonian Academy of Science, Biology, and Ecology, following the finding of the University of Tartu specimen, concluded that the phenomenon is possible but rare.

== In popular culture ==
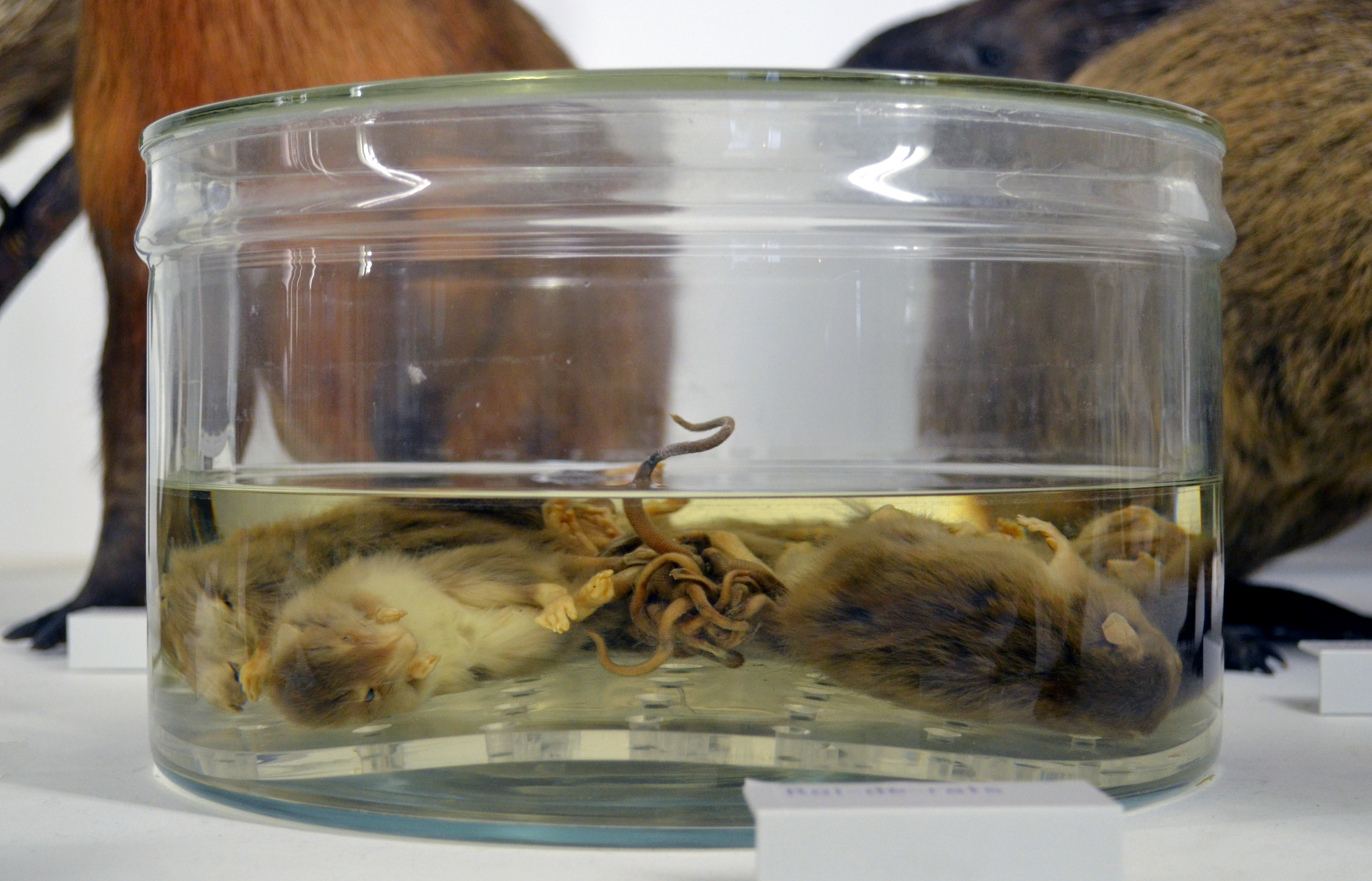
Rat king found in 1986 in Vendée

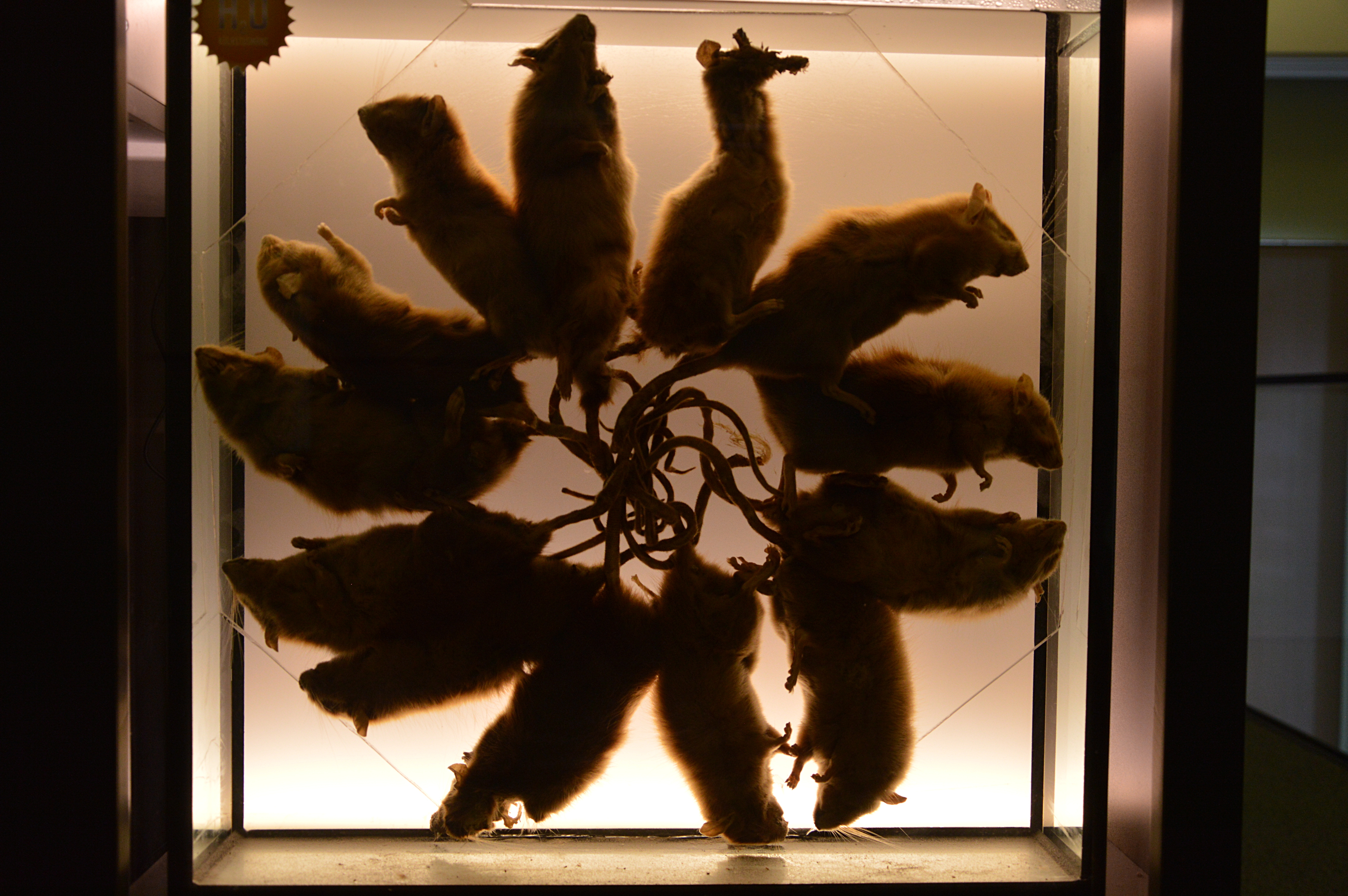
Rat king in the University of Tartu Natural History Museum found in 2005

The antagonist in the Nutcracker (story and ballet) is called ‘The Rat King’ and often portrayed as a three-headed rat, or a seven-headed rat.

In The Amazing Maurice and his Educated Rodents by Terry Pratchett, members of the Ratcatchers' Guild create rat kings as a masterpiece to demonstrate their skill in handling live rats.

The phenomenon's name appeared as the title of a Boston Manor song released in 2020, which according to singer Henry Cox explained was a metaphor for contemporary political and social events.

A creature known as the Rat King is featured in the 2020 action-adventure video game The Last of Us Part II. It is a conjoinment of multiple fungus-infected humans found in the underground levels of a hospital. Three actors were tied together to perform motion capture for the creature. Co-director Kurt Margenau described the idea behind the Rat King as the team's take on "what happens to them [the infected] when they sit around for a really long time."

A three-head rat sovereign appears as the primary antagonist in Mac Barnett's graphic novel, The First Cat in Space Ate Pizza.

In the novel La Foresta by Granville collective the rodent king is called the Ratenkönig and depicted as seven rodents with their tails tied together.

In the upcoming game Deadlock by Valve Corporation, a humanoid rat monarch character named "Rat King" is available to play among the game's character roster.

Comedian Theo Von uses the term "Rat King" as his personal monkier in addition to naming his latest (2021-Present) traveling show "Return of the Rat Tour".

== See also ==
- Squirrel king
