= Can I Play That? =

American video game journalism website

Can I Play That? is an American video game journalism website founded in 2018. A self-billed ‘game accessibility resource for both players and developers’, Can I Play That? specializes in providing accessibility reviews, features and news coverage on accessibility in games and the wider games industry. Can I Play That? also advocates for diversity and inclusion in games, and educates developers and studios about accessibility.

In addition to editorial pieces, Can I Play That? provides accessibility guidelines, and runs workshops on Diversity, Equity and Inclusion in Games and Accessible Community Management.

== History ==
Can I Play That? was founded in November 2018 by Coty Craven. The website was created to cater to the wider spectrum of gamers’ experiences and tackle inaccessibility in video games. The first game to receive a perfect score for accessibility from Can I Play That? was Gears 5, by The Coalition.

In January 2021, Can I Play That? announced two new collaborations as part of an initiative called Learn with CIPT: an Accessible Community Management workshop co-hosted by Coty Craven and Stacey Jenkins, and a Diversity, Equity and Inclusion in Games workshop, co-hosted by Coty Craven and Yi Shun Lai. Workshops have been delivered at studios such as Ubisoft and Splash Damage, and on July 19, 2021, Craven co-hosted an Accessible Community Management summit with Stacey Jenkins at the Game Developers Conference 2021.

In August 2024, former editor Grant Stoner published an exposé on gaming website IGN, concluding that one of the site's credited founders, Susan Banks, was a false persona used by the site's other founder, Coty Craven. In the time since Banks's supposed death, Craven used two additional fake identities to pose as disability advocates of color. Craven deleted their entire social media presence just before the article was released. Shortly thereafter, the Can I Play That? website completely removed mention of both Craven and Banks as the site's founders from its "About" page.

== Staff ==
- Coty Craven – Founder and Director of Operations and Business Development (formerly Editor-in-Chief)
- Ben Bayliss – Editor-in-Chief
- Marijn (ActiveB1t) – Site Operations Manager
- Steve Saylor – Media Editor
- Grant Stoner – Editor (September 2019 – January 2021)

== Contributors ==
Can I Play That? accepts submissions from disabled gamers such as personal essays, commentary and features. In addition to the core staff members, regular contributors have included Stacey Jenkins, Antonio Martinez, Christy Smith Berman and Grant Stoner. Unlike other games journalism websites, Can I Play That? focuses specifically on accessibility in games, rather than content reviews. The site is run by and contributed to by disabled gamers, with contributors only reviewing the features they use themselves rather than speaking for other disabled gamers.

== Recognition ==
- Can I Play That? was awarded the 2020 Global Games Advocacy Award at the Women In Games Global Games Awards.
- In September 2019, Coty Craven appeared on NPR's 1A podcast, together with Games Accessibility Specialist / Developer, Cherry Thompson.
- USA Today referenced the work of Grant Stoner, a mobility writer for Can I Play That?, in an article about accessibility in The Last of Us: Part II. The BBC and CNN interviewed Coty Craven and Steve Saylor about accessibility options in the game.
- Resources by Can I Play That? have been highlighted by prominent game companies such as Microsoft.
- Can I Play That? contributor Grant Stoner was a member of the voting jury for the Game Awards 2020.
