= BlowOut =

2003 run and gun video game

- Developer: Terminal Reality
- Publisher: Majesco
- Composer: Sean Kolton
- Engine: Infernal Engine
- Platforms: GameCube, Microsoft Windows, PlayStation 2, Xbox
- Release: October 28, 2003: Windows; NA: October 28, 2003 PS2, Xbox; NA: November 5, 2003; EU: November 26, 2004 (Xbox); EU: December 10, 2004 (PS2) GameCube; NA: November 26, 2003
- Genre: Run and gun
- Mode: Single-player

BlowOut is a 2003 run and gun video game developed by Terminal Reality and published by Majesco, released for the Microsoft Windows, PlayStation 2, Xbox, and GameCube.

== Gameplay ==
The game plays as a 2.5D side-scrolling run and gun shoot 'em up with elements of a platformer. It follows the tradition of games such as Contra and Metal Slug, with a power-up-based non-linear exploration structure akin to Metroid. The player takes the role of TransFed Marshall John "Dutch" Cane, a space marine sent to check up on researchers on the space platform named Honour Guard, only to discover that they have been mutilated by aliens. On the way through each level, the player can blast through walls, floors or ceilings to reveal secret areas, and shoot in full 360-degree range. There are 10 levels in total.

== Reception ==
Reception

Aggregate score
Aggregator	Score			
Aggregator	GameCube	PC	PS2	Xbox
Metacritic	68 of 100	65 of 100	58 of 100	55 of 100

Review scores
Publication	Score			
Publication	GameCube	PC	PS2	Xbox
1Up.com	B−	N/A	N/A	N/A
Game Informer	N/A	N/A	N/A	6.5 of 10
GameSpot	N/A	N/A	5.2 of 10	5 of 10
IGN	6.5 of 10	N/A	6.5 of 10	6.5 of 10
Nintendo Power	3.6 of 5	N/A	N/A	N/A
Official U.S. PlayStation Magazine	N/A	N/A	3 of 5	N/A
Official Xbox Magazine (UK)	N/A	N/A	N/A	3 of 10
Official Xbox Magazine (US)	N/A	N/A	N/A	3 of 10
TeamXbox	N/A	N/A	N/A	6.3 of 10
X-Play	N/A	N/A	2 of 5	N/A

The game received "mixed or average reviews" on all platforms according to the review aggregation website Metacritic.

== Publication history ==
In January 2009, the game was released on the Xbox Live Marketplace as part of the Xbox Originals program.
