= The Last of Us =

Video game franchise

- Genre: Action-adventure
- Developer: Naughty Dog
- Publisher: Sony Interactive Entertainment (Note: Formerly Sony Computer Entertainment)
- Creators: Neil Druckmann; Bruce Straley
- Artist: Erick Pangilinan
- Writers: Neil Druckmann; Halley Gross
- Composer: Gustavo Santaolalla
- Platforms: PlayStation 3; PlayStation 4; PlayStation 5; Windows
- First release: The Last of Us; June 14, 2013
- Latest release: The Last of Us Part II Remastered; January 19, 2024

The Last of Us is an action-adventure video game series and media franchise created by Naughty Dog and published by Sony Interactive Entertainment. The series is set in a post-apocalyptic United States ravaged by cannibalistic humans infected by a mutated fungus in the genus Cordyceps. It follows several survivors, including Joel, a smuggler who lost his daughter during the outbreak; Ellie, a young girl who is immune to the infection; and Abby, a soldier who becomes involved in a conflict between her militia and a religious cult. The games use a third-person perspective in which the player fights against hostile humans and cannibalistic creatures with firearms, improvised weapons, and stealth.

Game director Bruce Straley and creative director Neil Druckmann led development of the first game, The Last of Us, which was released for the PlayStation 3 in June 2013 and PlayStation 4 in July 2014. (Note: The Last of Us Remastered was released on July 29, 2014, in North America; July 30 in Europe, Australia, and New Zealand; and August 1 in the United Kingdom and Ireland.) A downloadable content expansion, The Last of Us: Left Behind, was released in February 2014 and follows Ellie and her best friend Riley. Druckmann continued to lead development of the sequel, The Last of Us Part II, which was released for the PlayStation 4 in June 2020, PlayStation 5 in January 2024, and Windows in April 2025. A remake of the first game, titled The Last of Us Part I, was released for the PlayStation 5 in September 2022 and Windows in March 2023.

The series has received critical acclaim and has won numerous awards, including several Game of the Year recognitions; the first game has been ranked as one of the greatest video games ever made, and the second won more than 320 Game of the Year awards. Games in the series are among the best-selling PlayStation 3 and PlayStation 4 games. The franchise has sold over 37 million games as of January 2023. Strong sales and support of the series led to the franchise's expansion into other media, including a comic book in 2013, live show in 2014, television adaptation for HBO and haunted house for Universal Studios in 2023, and tabletop game by Themeborne in 2024.

== Media ==
=== Video games ===
Timeline – Video games
2013	The Last of Us
2014	The Last of Us: Left Behind
2014	The Last of Us Remastered
2015
2016
2017
2018
2019
2020	The Last of Us Part II
2021
2022	The Last of Us Part I
2023
2024	The Last of Us Part II Remastered

The Last of Us was released for the PlayStation 3 on June 14, 2013. A remastered version, titled The Last of Us Remastered, was released for the PlayStation 4 in July 2014. Twenty years after losing his daughter Sarah during the outbreak of the mutant Cordyceps fungus, Joel is tasked with escorting Ellie, a teenage girl who is immune to the infection, across a post-apocalyptic United States so the revolutionary group Fireflies can potentially create a cure. Throughout their journey, the two become closer after experiencing several traumatic events. After arriving in Salt Lake City, Ellie is prepared for surgery, which will involve killing her. Unwilling to let her die, Joel battles his way to the operating room, kills the lead surgeon, and carries the unconscious Ellie to safety. When Ellie wakes up, Joel lies to her, stating the attempts to create a cure had failed.

The Last of Us: Left Behind was released for the PlayStation 3 on February 14, 2014. A downloadable expansion pack of The Last of Us, Left Behind was included in Remastered for the PlayStation 4 in 2014, and was released as a stand-alone expansion pack for the PlayStation 3 and PlayStation 4 on May 12, 2015. It is set three weeks before the events of the main game, following Ellie as she spends time with her best friend Riley in an abandoned mall in Boston. Riley reveals she has been assigned to a group of Fireflies in a different city. Ellie tearfully begs Riley not to leave; Riley agrees and rips her Firefly pendant off, prompting Ellie to kiss her. They are overrun by Infected and both bitten. They briefly consider shooting themselves to prevent the infection taking over them, but instead choose to spend their final hours together.

The Last of Us Part II was released for the PlayStation 4 on June 19, 2020. A remastered version, titled The Last of Us Part II Remastered, was released for the PlayStation 5 in January 2024 and Windows in April 2025. Four years after the events of the first game, Abby Anderson tracks down and kills Joel as revenge for murdering her father, the head Firefly surgeon. Ellie and her girlfriend Dina set out for Seattle to track down Abby. Over the course of three days, Ellie kills several of Abby's friends, while Abby befriends Lev, who has been branded an apostate after defying the traditions of the religious cult Seraphites. After Abby discovers her friends dead, she tracks down Ellie and overpowers her, but spares them at Lev's insistence. Several months later, Ellie and Dina are living on a farm. Ellie sets out to find Abby again in Santa Barbara; she discovers Abby and Lev captured and forces Abby to fight. Ellie overpowers her but has a change of heart and lets her live. Abby and Lev sail to the Fireflies, while Ellie returns to the farmhouse and finds it empty.

The Last of Us Part I was released for the PlayStation 5 on September 2, 2022, and for Windows on March 28, 2023. It is a remake of the first game, featuring revised gameplay, overhauled artificial intelligence, improved performance, and expanded accessibility options.

=== Other media ===
Timeline – Other media
2013	American Dreams
2014	One Night Live
2015
2016
2017
2018
2019
2020
2021
2022
2023	Television – season 1
2023	Halloween Horror Nights
2024	Escape the Dark
2025	Television – season 2
2025	Part I and Part II Scripts
2026
2027	Television – season 3

A four-issue comic book miniseries, The Last of Us: American Dreams, was published by Dark Horse Comics from April to July 2013. Written by the game's creative director Neil Druckmann and illustrated by Faith Erin Hicks, the comics serve as a prequel to the game, chronicling the journey of a younger Ellie and Riley. At The Last of Us: One Night Live on July 28, 2014, the game's cast performed a live reading of selected scenes in Santa Monica, California, with live music by game composer Gustavo Santaolalla. The performance was hosted and directed by Druckmann, with graphics by Alex Hobbs.

On The Last of Us Day in September 2020, CMON announced it was developing The Last of Us: The Board Game, a tabletop game intended to focus on exploration, narrative, and survival elements, though it received no subsequent updates. A different tabletop game, The Last of Us: Escape the Dark, was announced in November 2022, produced by Naughty Dog and Themeborne; the game allows up to five players to try to reach safety from enemies while exploring locations from the game. It was released through Asmodee in the United States on November 29, 2024.

In January 2025, Druckmann announced a physical experience allowing users to fight against the infected in Seattle during the events of Part II with virtual weapons, immersive video, audio, and scent technologies, first exhibited at the Consumer Electronics Show. The Last of Us: Part I and Part II Scripts—a 618-page hardcover book featuring the scripts for The Last of Us, Left Behind, and Part II—was published by Dark Horse Books on December 16, 2025, featuring a foreword by Joel's actor Troy Baker and art by principal character concept artist Hyoung Nam.

==== Canceled films ====
On March 6, 2014, Sony announced Screen Gems would distribute a film adaptation of The Last of Us, written by Druckmann and produced by Sam Raimi. By January 2015, Druckmann had written the script's second draft, and performed a read-through with some actors. In April 2016, Druckmann stated the film had entered development hell; in November, Raimi said the film was at a standstill after Sony had a disagreement with Druckmann. The rights had relinquished by 2019. Druckmann said the film fell apart as the studio was focused on big action set-pieces, whereas he felt The Last of Us was better approached as a smaller indie film. Actress Maisie Williams expressed enthusiasm in playing Ellie, and was in talks with both Druckmann and Raimi to take the role, while Kaitlyn Dever participated in a table read.

In January 2020, images surfaced of an animated short film adaptation of The Last of Us by production agency Oddfellows. The 20-minute film was intended to "serve as a strong bridge" between the game and its sequel and would "reinterpret each of the chapters of the game with a unique visual treatment" but was canceled by Sony. In 2023, Druckmann said he had written a short story after the first game was released about Ellie's mother, which was intended to be adapted into an animated short film, but "it fell apart"; it was later incorporated into the television adaptation.

==== Television series ====
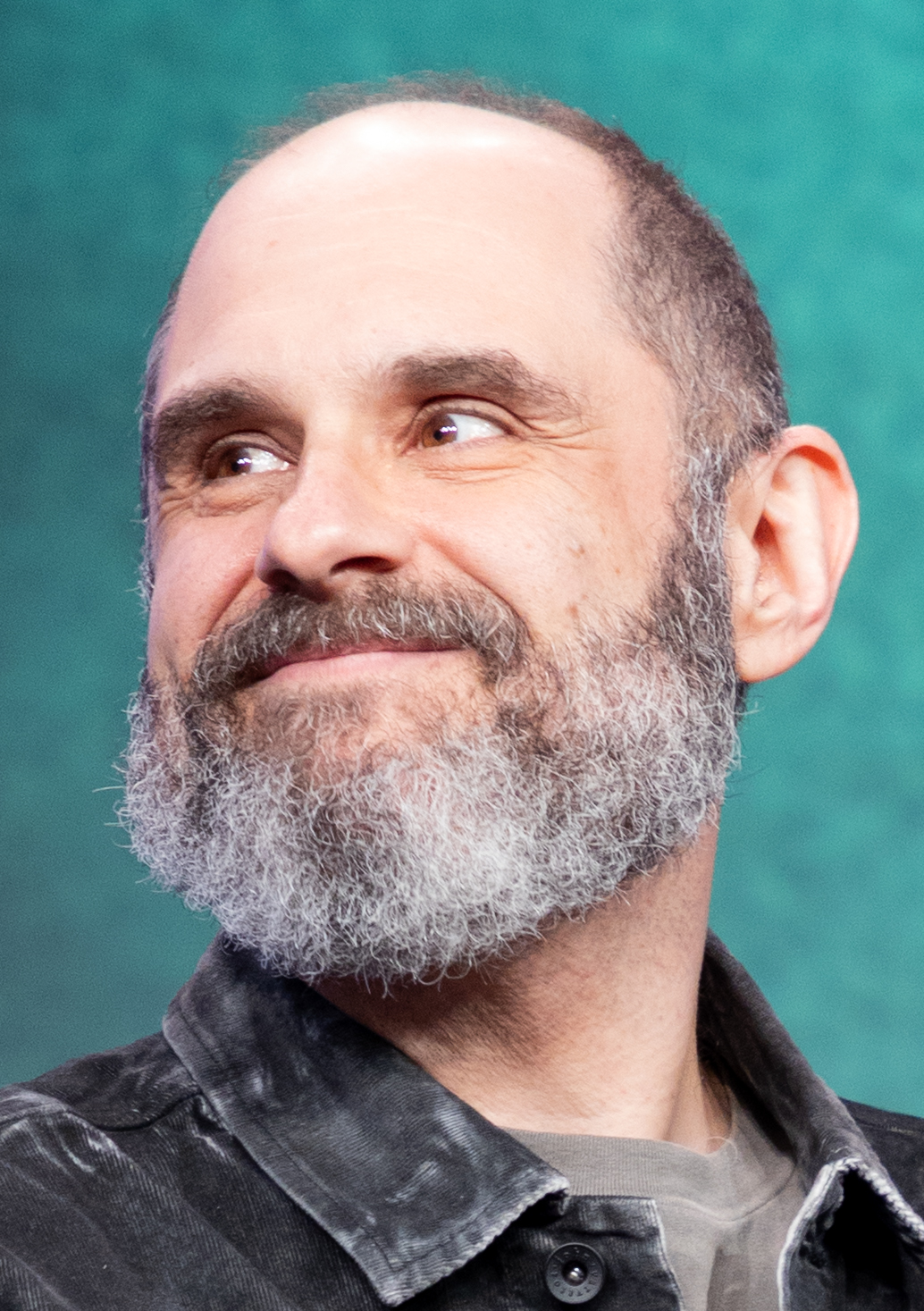
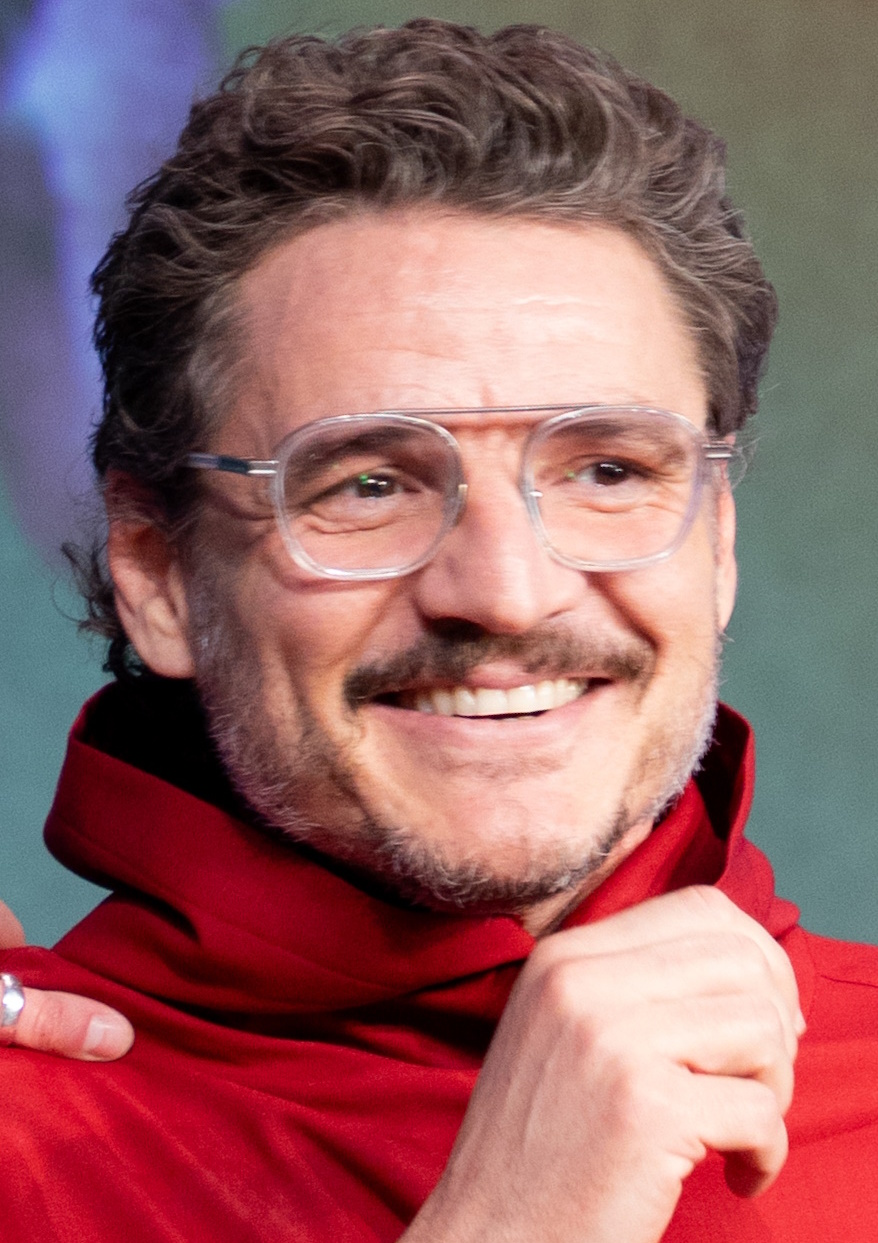
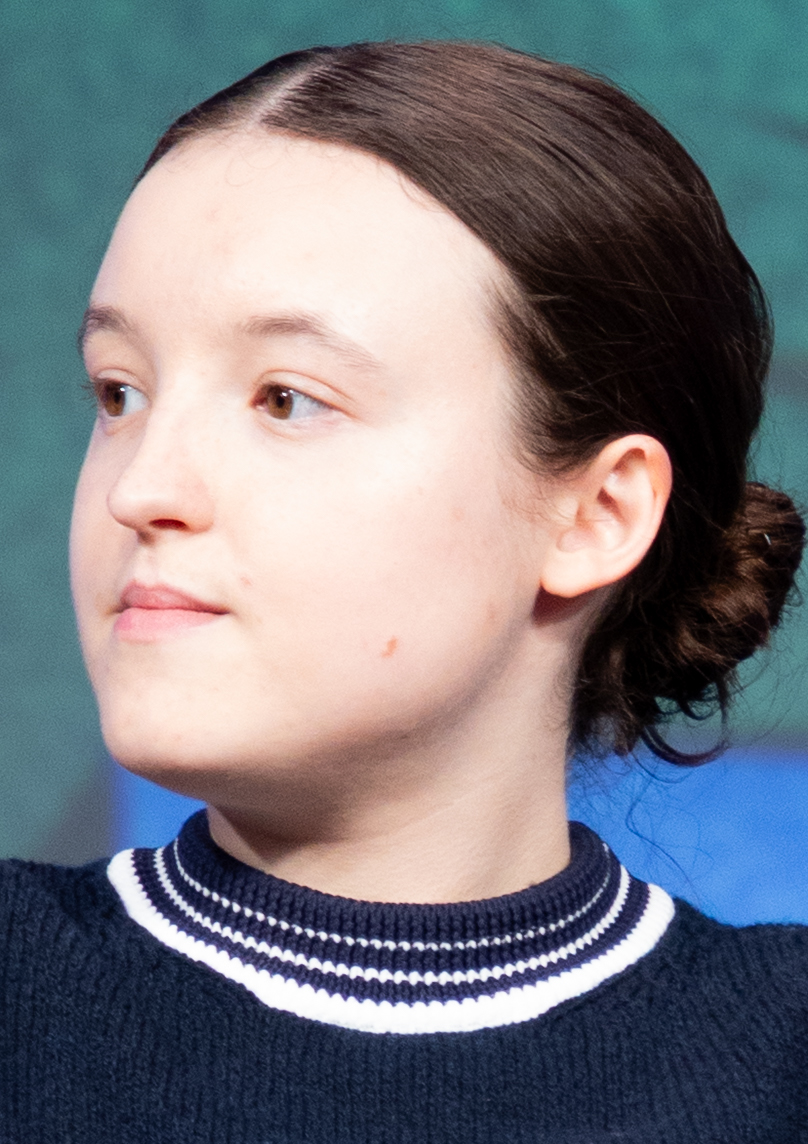
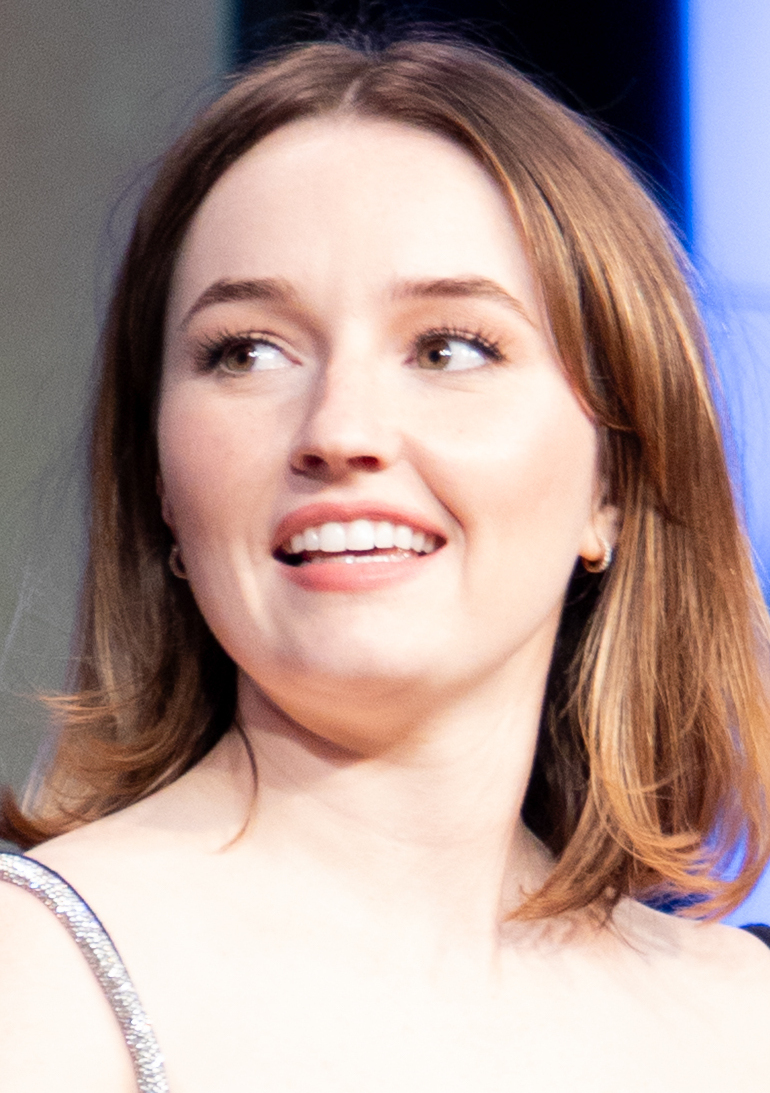
Craig Mazin (left) co-created the television adaptation of The Last of Us, which stars (left to right) Pedro Pascal, Bella Ramsey, and Kaitlyn Dever as Joel, Ellie, and Abby.

In March 2020, a television adaptation of the game was announced in the planning stages at HBO; it was formally greenlit in November 2020. Druckmann and Craig Mazin wrote and executive produced the series, and both directed episodes; while additional executive producers include Carolyn Strauss and Rose Lam, former Naughty Dog president Evan Wells, and PlayStation Productions's Asad Qizilbash and Carter Swan. The show is a joint production between Sony Pictures Television, PlayStation Productions, Naughty Dog, The Mighty Mint, and Word Games; it is the first show produced by PlayStation Productions. Santaolalla and David Fleming compose the score.

The show stars Pedro Pascal and Bella Ramsey as Joel and Ellie, respectively. Gabriel Luna plays Tommy, Merle Dandridge reprises her role as Marlene, and Anna Torv plays Tess. Druckmann said some scripts borrow dialogue directly from the game, while others deviate; some of the game's action-heavy sequences were changed to focus on character drama, at HBO's encouragement. Filming for the first season took place in Alberta, Canada, from July 2021 to June 2022, and it debuted on HBO and HBO Max on January 15, 2023. On January 27, less than two weeks after the series premiere, HBO renewed the series for a second season, which was filmed in British Columbia from February to August 2024 and premiered in April 2025, starring Isabela Merced as Dina, Young Mazino as Jesse, and Kaitlyn Dever as Abby. The series is the first live-action video game adaptation to receive major awards consideration, including an Emmy nomination for Outstanding Drama Series. HBO renewed the series for a third season on April 9, 2025, ahead of the second's premiere. Druckmann stepped away from creative duties on the series in July.

==== Halloween Horror Nights ====
To celebrate the first game's tenth anniversary in 2023, a haunted house was established at Universal Orlando from September 1 and Universal Studios Hollywood from September 7 as part of Halloween Horror Nights (HHN), ending October 31. In the attraction, guests navigate the Pittsburgh Quarantine Zone alongside other survivors as well as Joel and Ellie, and encounter enemies from the game including infected, raiders, and hunters. Several elements are taken directly from the game, such as Ish's notes. The Hollywood and Orlando teams collaborated in creating the haunted house, led by their creative directors John Murdy and Michael Aiello, respectively.

Druckmann broached the idea in a meeting in December 2021 after fans tagged both HHN and Naughty Dog on Twitter. Universal collaborated with Naughty Dog and Druckmann, who provided development materials. Instead of a montage-like house, Druckmann wanted it to center on Joel and Ellie's story, selecting the Pittsburgh setting because of its environmental variety and narrative completeness. The pitch deck consisted of screenshots from the game. Druckmann invited Troy Baker and Ashley Johnson to reprise their roles as Joel and Ellie with additional dialogue, not wanting sound-alikes to imitate their original performances; they agreed, citing their fondness of HHN. The HHN team added lines to the game's script, which Druckmann rewrote in the characters' voices. Murdy directed their performances.

== Cast and characters ==
Character	Video games			Stage	Park attraction	Television series		
Character	The Last of Us / Part I (2013 / 2022)	The Last of Us: Left Behind (2014)	The Last of Us Part II (2020)	The Last of Us: One Night Live (2014)	Halloween Horror Nights (2023)	The Last of Us		
Character	The Last of Us / Part I (2013 / 2022)	The Last of Us: Left Behind (2014)	The Last of Us Part II (2020)	The Last of Us: One Night Live (2014)	Halloween Horror Nights (2023)	Season 1 (2023)	Season 2 (2025)	Season 3
Joel	Troy Baker	Troy Baker	Troy Baker	Troy Baker	Troy Baker	Pedro Pascal	Pedro Pascal	
Ellie	Ashley Johnson	Ashley Johnson	Ashley Johnson	Ashley Johnson	Ashley Johnson	Bella Ramsey	Bella Ramsey	Bella Ramsey
Sarah	Hana Hayes		photograph	Hana Hayes		Nico Parker		
Tommy	Jeffrey Pierce		Jeffrey Pierce			Gabriel Luna	Gabriel Luna	Gabriel Luna
Tess	Annie Wersching			Annie Wersching		Anna Torv		
Robert	Robin Atkin Downes					Brendan Fletcher		
Marlene	Merle Dandridge		Merle Dandridge	Merle Dandridge		Merle Dandridge		
Bill	W. Earl Brown		mentioned			Nick Offerman		
Henry	Brandon Scott					Lamar Johnson		
Sam	Nadji Jeter					Keivonn Woodard		
Maria	Ashley Scott		Ashley Scott			Rutina Wesley	Rutina Wesley	
James	Reuben Langdon					Troy Baker		
David	Nolan North					Scott Shepherd		
Jerry	Derek Phillips		Derek Phillips	Annie Wersching (Note: Wersching portrayed several characters during the performance in place of their original actors.)		Darren Dolynski		Patrick Wilson
Frank	no performer					Murray Bartlett		
Anna	mentioned					Ashley Johnson		
Riley	mentioned	Yaani King				Storm Reid		
Abby			Laura Bailey				Kaitlyn Dever	Kaitlyn Dever
Dina			Shannon Woodward				Isabela Merced	Isabela Merced
Jesse			Stephen Chang				Young Mazino	Young Mazino
Lev			Ian Alexander					Kyriana Kratter
Yara			Victoria Grace					Michelle Mao
Manny			Alejandro Edda				Danny Ramirez	Jorge Lendeborg Jr.
Owen			Patrick Fugit				Spencer Lord	Spencer Lord
Mel			Ashly Burch				Ariela Barer	Ariela Barer
Nora			Chelsea Tavares				Tati Gabrielle	Tati Gabrielle
Isaac			Jeffrey Wright				Jeffrey Wright	Jeffrey Wright
Seth			Robert Clotworthy				Robert John Burke	
Eugene			photograph				Joe Pantoliano	
Cat / Kat			mentioned				Noah Lamanna	
Kathleen						Melanie Lynskey		
Perry						Jeffrey Pierce		
Gail							Catherine O'Hara	
Javier							Tony Dalton	
Hanley								Jason Ritter

== Development and history ==
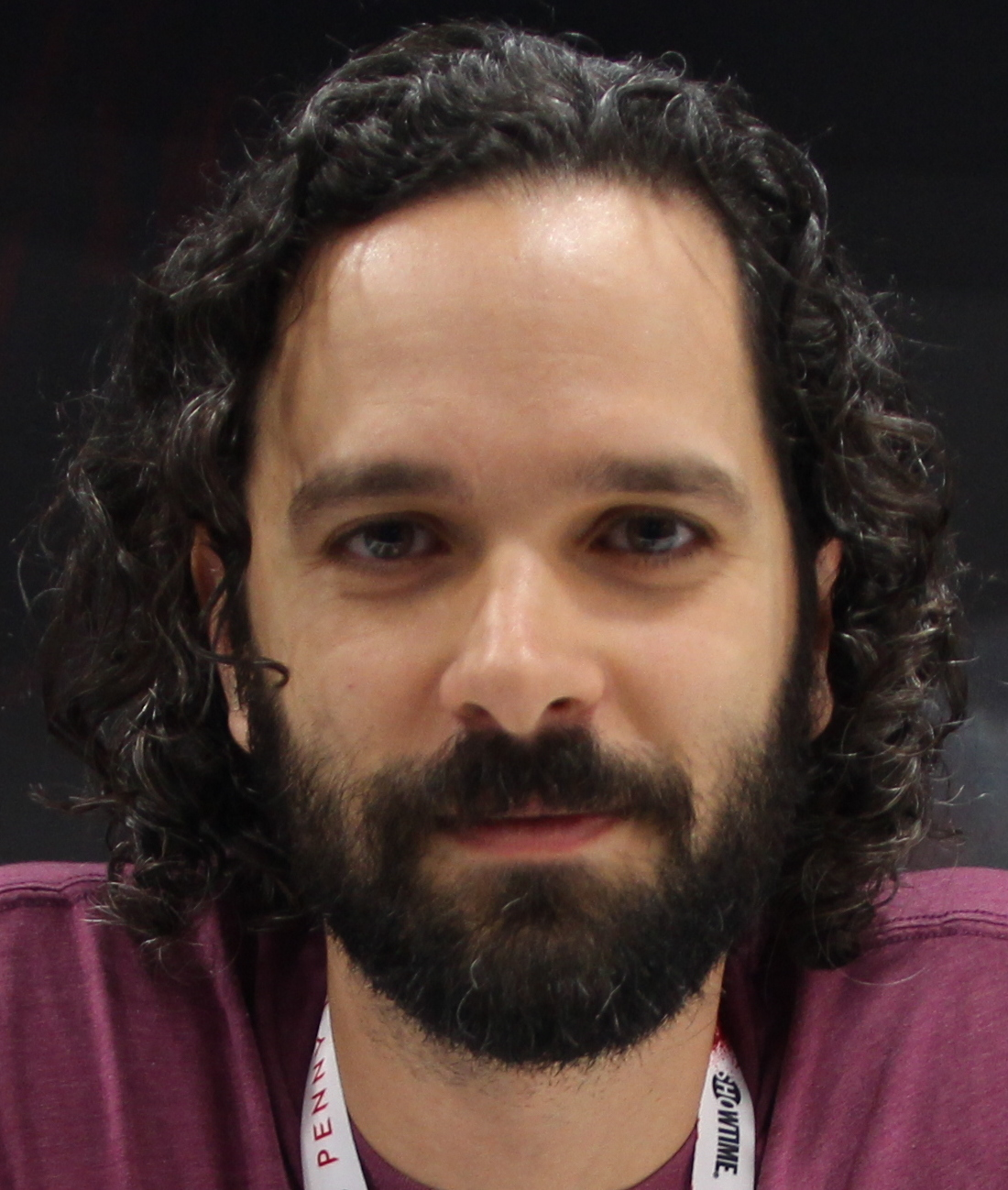
Neil Druckmann

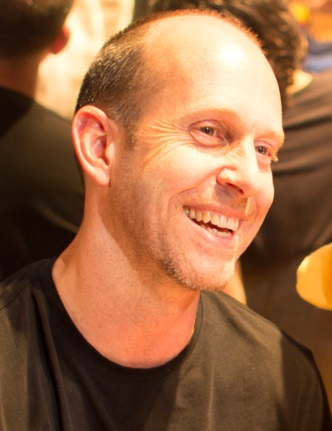
Bruce Straley

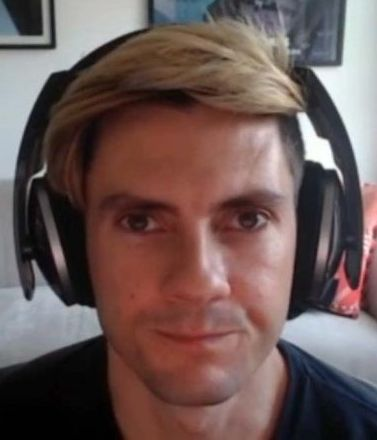
Anthony Newman

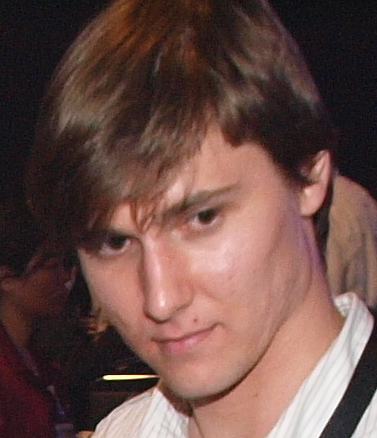
Kurt Margenau

Druckmann was creative director and writer on all main games. Straley was game director for The Last of Us and Left Behind, replaced by Newman and Margenau for Part II.

Preliminary work on The Last of Us, under the codename "Project Thing" or "T1", began after the release of Uncharted 2: Among Thieves in October 2009. For the first time in the company's history, developer Naughty Dog split into two teams to work on projects concurrently; while one team developed Uncharted 3: Drake's Deception (2011), the other began work on The Last of Us. In order to run the two teams smoothly, co-presidents Evan Wells and Christophe Balestra chose game director Bruce Straley and creative director Neil Druckmann to lead development on The Last of Us. Straley, who was employed at Naughty Dog in March 1999, was selected to lead the project based on his experience and his work on previous projects, while Druckmann, an employee since 2004, was chosen for his determination and talent for design about a year into the game's production.

While at university, Druckmann had an idea to merge the gameplay of Ico (2001) in a story set during a zombie apocalypse, like that of George A. Romero's Night of the Living Dead (1968), with a lead character similar to John Hartigan from Sin City (1991–2000). The lead character, a police officer, would be tasked with protecting a young girl; however, due to the lead character's heart condition, players would often assume control of the young girl, reversing the roles. Druckmann later developed it when creating the story of The Last of Us. Druckmann views The Last of Us as a coming of age story, in which Ellie adapts to survival after spending time with Joel, as well as an exploration of how willing a father is to save his child. The Last of Us was announced on December 10, 2011, at the Spike Video Game Awards, alongside its debut trailer. The announcement ignited widespread anticipation within the gaming industry, which journalists ascribed to Naughty Dog's reputation. The game missed its original projected release date of May 7, 2013, and was pushed to June 14, 2013, worldwide for further polishing. To promote pre-order sales, Naughty Dog collaborated with several retailers to provide special editions of the game with extra content.

Naughty Dog began developing Left Behind following the release of The Last of Us with a team about half the size. Following the decision to create single-player downloadable content for the game, the development team immediately decided the story would focus on the character of Ellie; they found players of The Last of Us were interested to learn about events in Ellie's life prior to the events of the main game, particularly the events involving Riley Abel, whom Ellie mentioned in The Last of Us. In addition, they found some players were interested in the events that occurred between the Fall and Winter segments of the main game, in which Ellie cares for an injured Joel. This led to the team deciding to contrast these two events against each other, feeling it would help the story's pacing. Straley said the team felt the story justified the development of Left Behind. The shorter time frame of development for Left Behind gave the team an opportunity to trial mechanics and ideas they were unable to test on the main game.

Early story concepts for The Last of Us Part II were conceived during the development of the first game. Naughty Dog began development in 2014, soon after the release of The Last of Us Remastered. By August 2017, with the release of Uncharted: The Lost Legacy, the entire 350-person team at Naughty Dog had shifted to develop Part II. Druckmann led development as creative director and writer; he co-wrote the story alongside Halley Gross. Straley left Naughty Dog in 2017; Anthony Newman and Kurt Margenau were selected to be co-game directors for Part II. Both were hired during the development of Uncharted 2 (2009); Newman was the melee combat designer for The Last of Us, and Margenau was game director on Uncharted: The Lost Legacy. Margenau and Newman oversaw and approved the gameplay elements, such as level design and mechanics. For the final months of development, due to the COVID-19 pandemic, the team operated via remote work arrangements. In total, approximately 2,169 developers across 14 studios worked on the game.

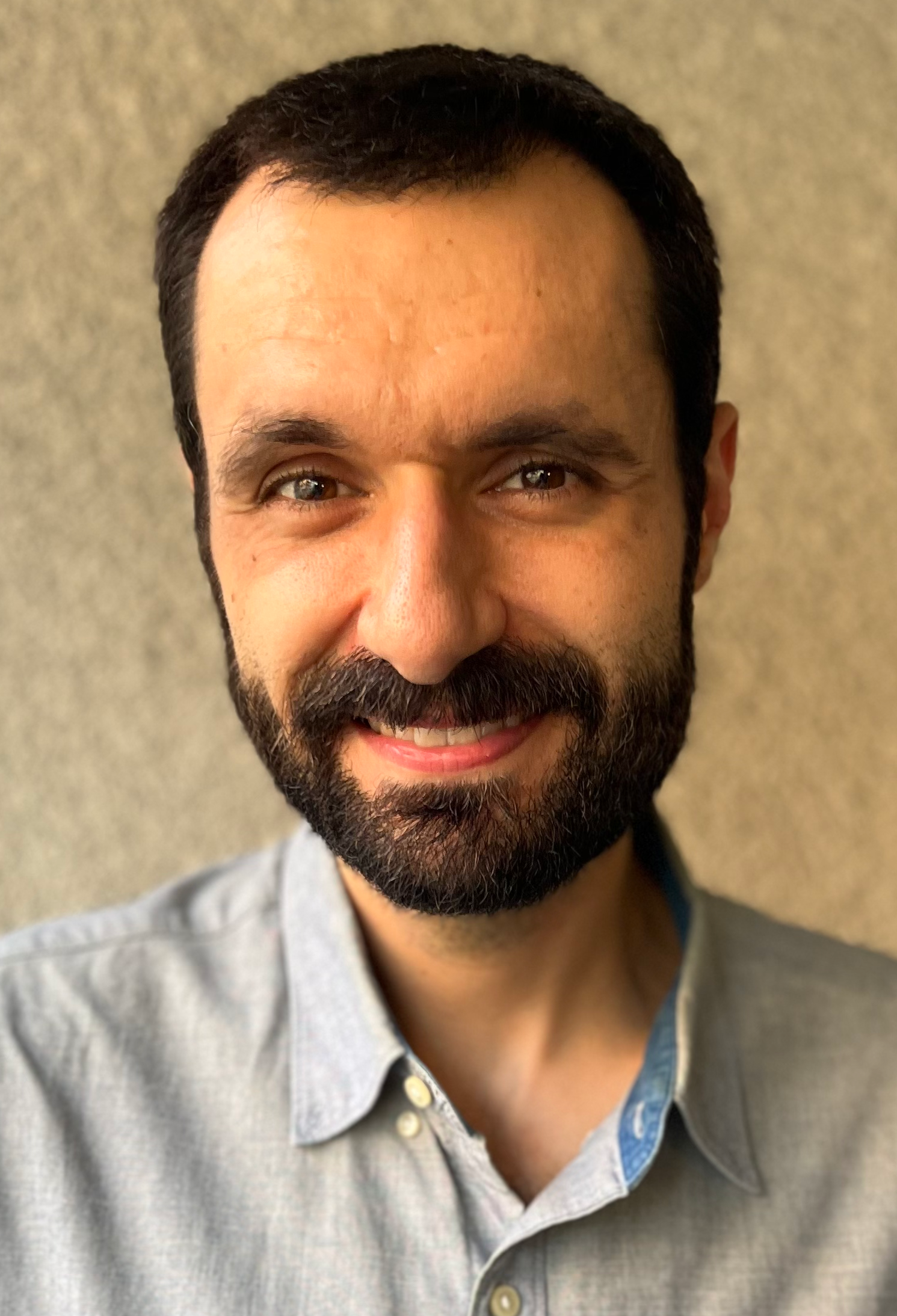
Matthew Gallant

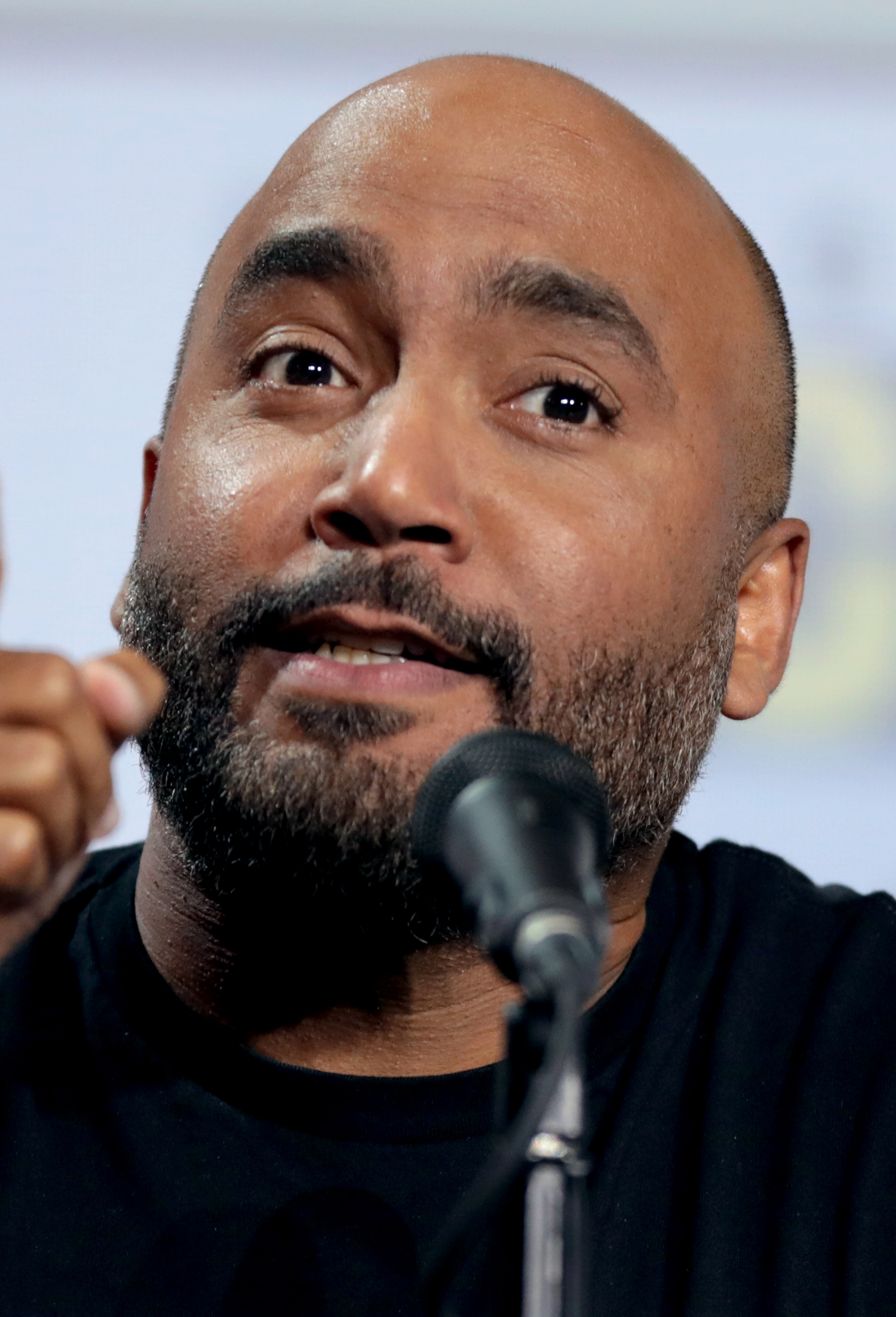
Shaun Escayg

Gallant and Escayg led development of Part I as game director and creative director, respectively.

The Last of Us Part II was announced at the PlayStation Experience event on December 3, 2016. The game missed its original projected release date of February 21, 2020, pushed to May for extra polishing, and later to June 19 due to logistical problems caused by the COVID-19 pandemic. In late April, several videos leaked online, showing cutscenes, gameplay, and significant plot details. Druckmann tweeted he was "heartbroken" for fans and for the team, who had devoted years to development. The development of Part II, according to a report by Kotaku's Jason Schreier, included a crunch schedule of 12-hour work days owing to the studio culture; after the game's delay, developers continued under this schedule for the additional months. Publisher Sony Interactive Entertainment granted the developer an additional two weeks of development for bug fixes.

The existence of The Last of Us Part I was first reported in April 2021 by Bloomberg News's Schreier. The game was announced in June 2022 at Summer Game Fest. It was released for the PlayStation 5 on September 2, 2022, and for Windows on March 28, 2023. Development was led by game director Matthew Gallant and creative director Shaun Escayg. Gallant previously worked as a combat designer on the original game and Uncharted 4: A Thief's End (2016), and became lead systems designer on Part II, co-leading its accessibility features. Escayg was lead cinematic animator on The Last of Us—his first game—and creative director on The Lost Legacy, followed by his work as creative director and co-writer of Marvel's Avengers (2020) at Crystal Dynamics, before returning to Naughty Dog in April 2021. Splitting their directing duties, Escayg took responsibility for the cinematics. Gallant found he resonated with the themes much more closely than during the development of the original game, having become a father in the interim. According to Escayg, the team approached the remake as "a love letter to our fans, to the franchise, and to ourselves as developers"; they felt a responsibility to preserve its essence and quality. Several of the creative leadership team of Part I worked on the original game.

Like the first game, an online multiplayer mode was originally in development for Part II, as confirmed in June 2018. In September 2019, following developer comments, Naughty Dog confirmed the multiplayer mode would be developed separately. The company increased its multiplayer-related job openings following Part II's release. At Summer Game Fest in June 2022, Druckmann confirmed the game would receive a standalone release and revealed the first concept art. He said it was "as big" as Naughty Dog's single-player games and would feature new characters and a different American location, suspected to be San Francisco based on the art. Development was led by co-game directors Newman and Vinit Agarwal and narrative lead Joseph Pettinati. Production was scaled back in May 2023 while Sony reassessed its direction, with many developers moved to other projects; Bungie evaluated the game at Sony's request and questioned its ability to maintain player engagement. Naughty Dog realized it would struggle to maintain a live service game while developing Intergalactic: The Heretic Prophet. Kotaku reported the game was "basically on ice" following layoffs in October. Naughty Dog canceled the game, titled The Last of Us Online, in December, noting its ambitious scale would have forced the studio to pull resources towards post-launch content instead of future single-player games. Development cost hundreds of millions of dollars, according to Schreier, and Agarwal said it was around 80 percent complete, following seven years of development.

Naughty Dog considered working on a third game in the series after Part II and spent time prototyping ideas before deciding to work on Intergalactic. Druckmann and Gross wrote an outline for a story set after Part II by April 2021, but noted it was not in active development. Druckmann later clarified the outline was for a "small story" focused on Tommy, rather than a full sequel to Part II; he felt it would eventually be released, possibly as a game or television series. Regarding a possible third main installment in the series, Druckmann said "there's more story to tell" by January 2023, and by April confirmed that he had a concept for a third main game, stating there is "probably one more chapter to this story". In March 2025, Druckmann warned not to "bet on there being more of Last of Us", noting the television series "could be it". The Last of Us Complete—a bundle featuring Part I and Part II Remastered—was released digitally on April 10, 2025, followed by a physical collector's edition on July 10, featuring a SteelBook case, art prints, and American Dreams. In March 2026, Druckmann said a "few stops ... remain on the road ahead", which some interpreted as a possible hint to a sequel, and in September he said two projects were in the works that "will expand the canon of The Last of Us beyond Part I and Part II", noting "Naughty Dog is still the steward of this IP".

== Reception ==
=== Video games ===
Aggregate review scores
Game	Year	Metacritic	OpenCritic
The Last of Us	2013 (PS3)	95/100	—
The Last of Us: Left Behind	2014 (PS3)	88/100	—
The Last of Us Remastered	2014 (PS4)	95/100	99%
The Last of Us Part II	2020 (PS4)	93/100	95%
The Last of Us Part I	2022 (PS5); 2023 (Win)	89/100; 59/100	76%
The Last of Us Part II Remastered	2024 (PS5); 2025 (Win)	90/100	90%

The first game received "universal acclaim", according to review aggregator Metacritic; it is the seventh-highest-rated PlayStation 3 game, and Remastered is the fourth-highest-rated PlayStation 4 game. It appeared on several lists of the best games of 2013, winning top honors at the Annie Awards, British Academy Video Games Awards, D.I.C.E. Awards, and Game Developers Choice Awards. It is considered one of the most significant seventh-generation video games and among the greatest video games of all time. The Last of Us Part II similarly received "universal acclaim" according to Metacritic; it is the sixth-highest-rated PlayStation 4 game, and Part II Remastered is the eleventh-highest-rated PlayStation 5 game. It won more than 320 Game of the Year awards, which several outlets deemed record-breaking, (Note: Several outlets claimed The Last of Us Part II broke the record for Game of the Year awards set by The Witcher 3: Wild Hunt (2015). It was surpassed by Elden Ring in 2022.) winning at the Game Awards, GLAAD Media Awards, Golden Joystick Awards, and Titanium Awards. According to Metacritic, Left Behind and the PlayStation 5 version of Part I received "generally favorable" reviews, while Part I's Windows version was Naughty Dog's lowest-rated game with "mixed or average" reviews.

The Last of Us games have been praised for their stories. IGN's Colin Moriarty named it one of the first game's standout features, and PlayStation Official Magazine's (OPM) David Meikleham wrote the pacing contributed to the story's impact. GameSpot's Tom Mc Shea found Left Behind's story insightful, and GamesRadar's Henry Gilbert described it as "intermittently intense, tragic, humorous, and even poignant". For Part II, Game Informer's Andy McNamara felt the writers conveyed the themes "with careful nuance and unflinching emotion", and Push Square's Sammy Barker particularly praised the use of flashback and overlapping stories; conversely, GamesRadar+'s Alex Avard felt the narrative lost its momentum by attempting to finalize every story thread, and Polygon's Maddy Myers and Kotaku's Riley MacLeod found the game repeatedly delivered its themes without allowing the player any agency in their decisions. Druckmann won several awards for his writing on the series, including two from the D.I.C.E. Awards, Game Developers Choice Awards, SXSW Gaming Awards, and Writers Guild of America Awards.

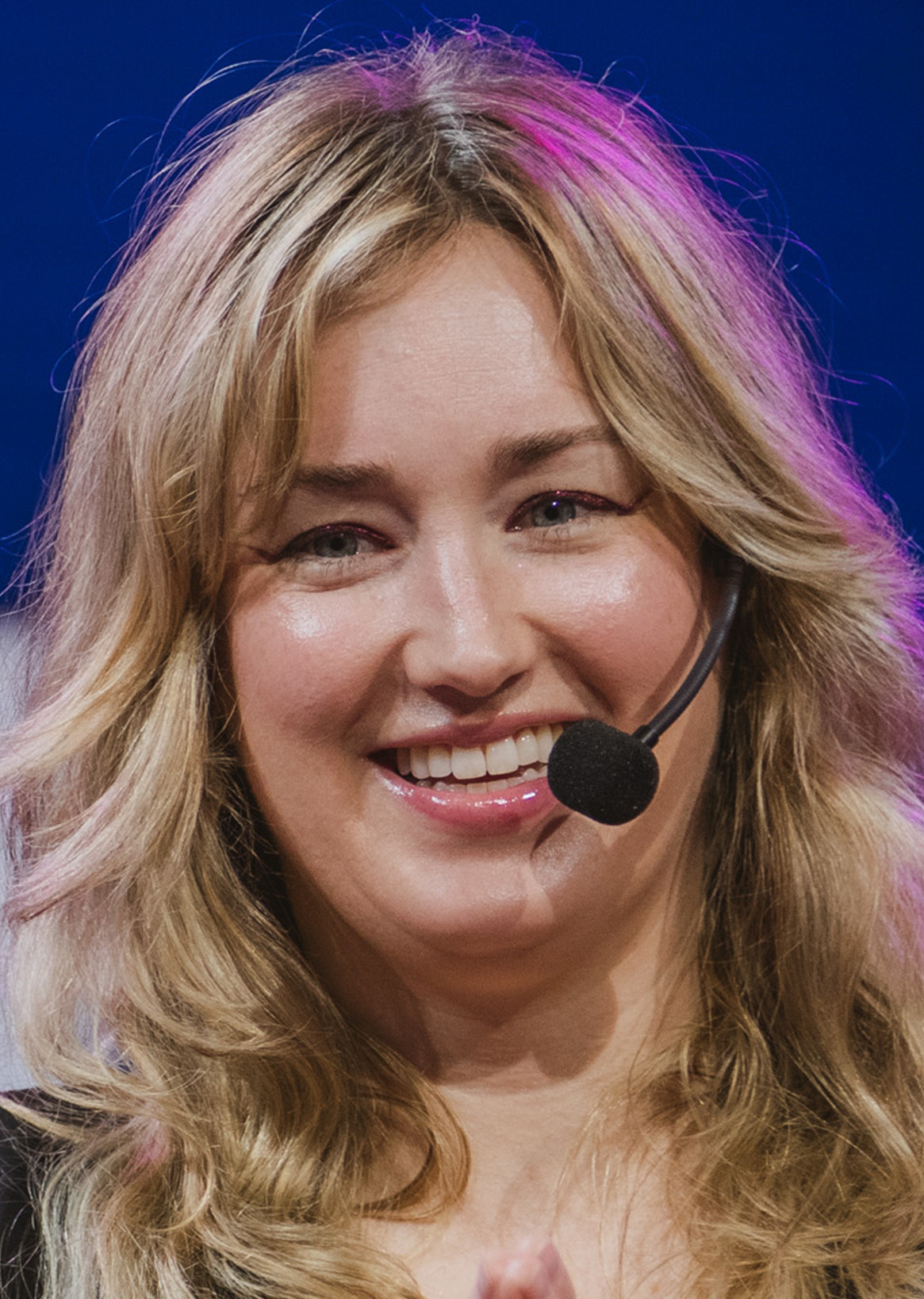
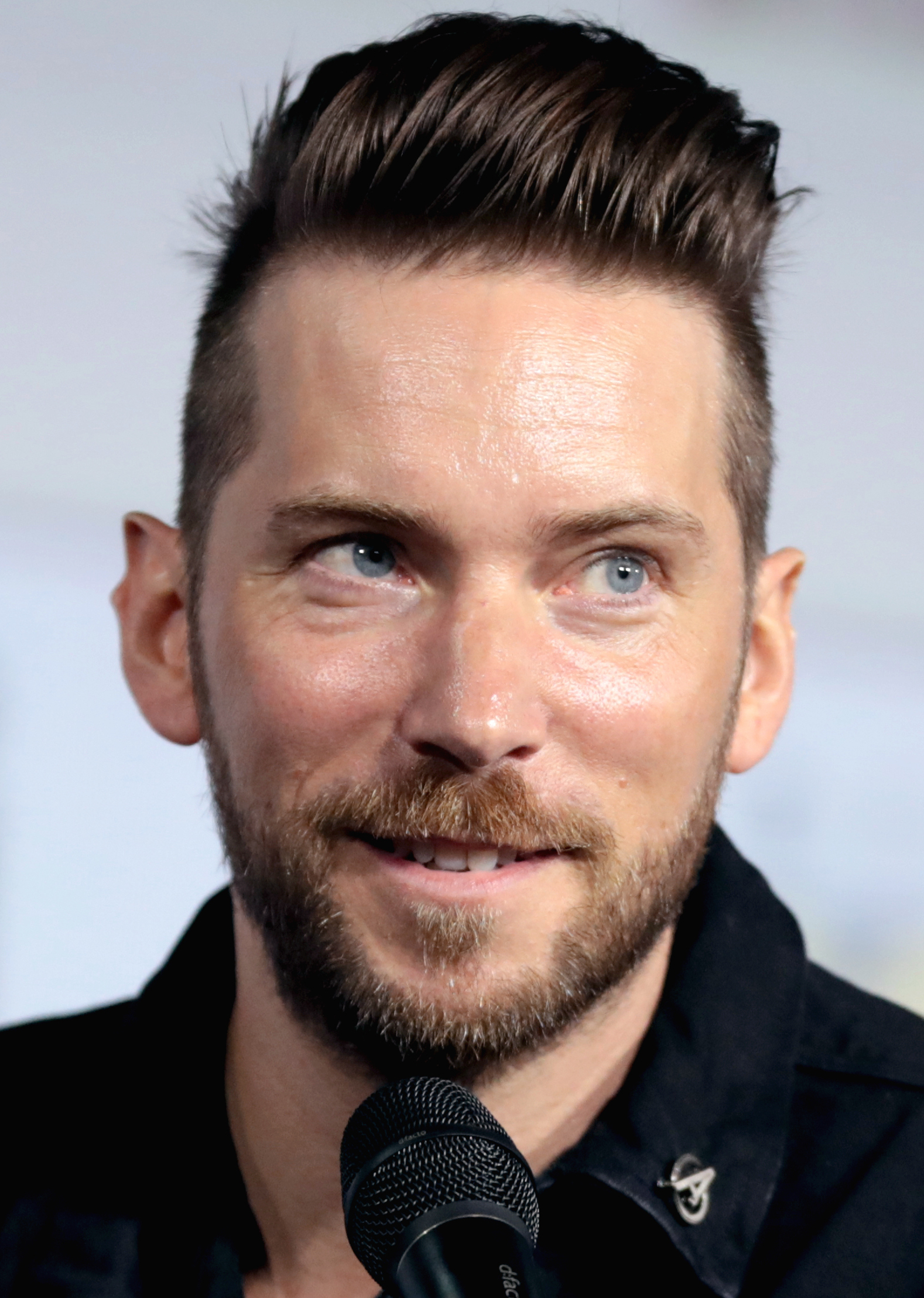
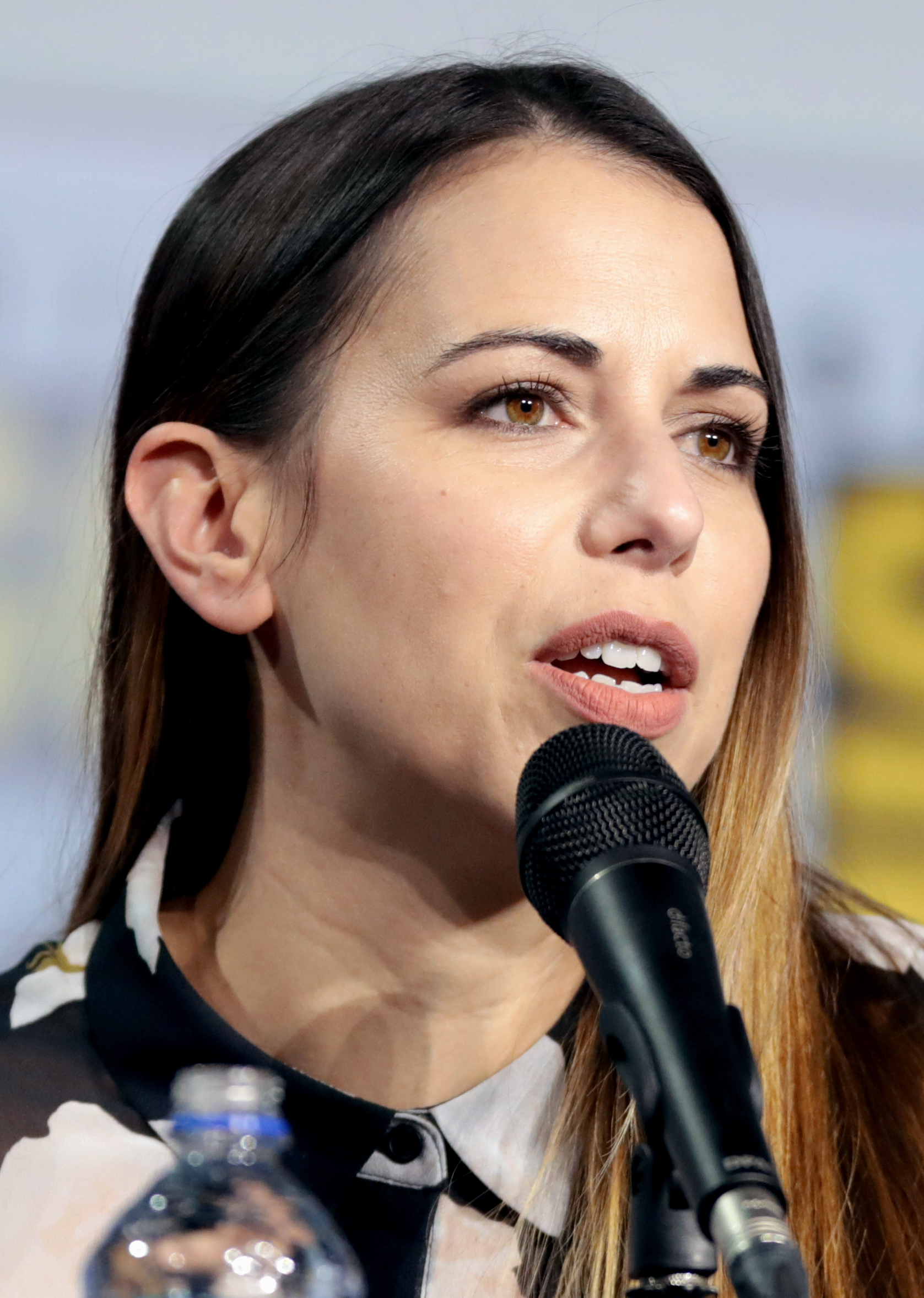
The performances of (L to R) Ashley Johnson, Troy Baker, and Laura Bailey as Ellie, Joel, and Abby, respectively, were widely praised by critics and received several awards.

Critics praised the characters in the series. The relationship between Joel and Ellie in the first game was lauded; Game Informer's Matt Helgeson found it identifiable and poignant, and OPM's David Meikleham considered them the best characters of any PlayStation 3 game. Praise was directed at Ellie and Riley's relationship in Left Behind, as well as Ellie and Dina's relationship in Part II. VG247's Kirk McKeand described every Part II character as "complex and human", and Destructoid's Chris Carter felt empathetic to the main characters. The cast's performances were highly praised, particularly Troy Baker as Joel, Ashley Johnson as Ellie, and Laura Bailey as Abby: for The Last of Us, Baker won Best Voice Actor at Spike VGX and Johnson won the D.I.C.E. Award for Outstanding Character Performance. Johnson won two consecutive British Academy Games Awards for Performer for The Last of Us and Left Behind, and was nominated for the award for Part II, but lost to Bailey for her performance as Abby; Bailey won Best Performance at the Game Awards 2020 against Johnson.

Reviewers largely considered The Last of Us, Part II, and Part I graphical showcases for the PlayStation 3, PlayStation 4, and PlayStation 5, respectively. The first game's art design was lauded as "outstanding" by Computer and Video Games's Andy Kelly, and "jaw-dropping" by Eurogamer's Oli Welsh. The Guardian's Keza MacDonald described Part II's graphics as "meticulous and astounding". IGN's Jonathon Dornbush appreciated the world's ability to tell additional stories. The Verge's Andrew Webster compared the improved graphics of Part I to modern blockbusters, and Siliconera's Josh Tolentino wrote it matched his memory of the original. The first game won the D.I.C.E. Award for Outstanding Achievement in Art Direction, and Part II won Best Visual Design at the 38th Golden Joystick Awards; both games were nominated for the British Academy Games Award for Artistic Achievement and the Game Developers Choice Award for Best Visual Art. Part I won Outstanding Visual Effects in a Real-Time Project at the 21st Visual Effects Society Awards. Part I's Windows version was criticized for its optimization, system requirements, and performance problems.

Many reviewers found the game's combat a refreshing difference from other games. Game Informer's Helgeson appreciated the vulnerability during fights, and IGN's Moriarty felt the crafting system assisted the combat, and the latter contributed to the narrative's emotional value by making enemies feel "human". Eurogamer's Stace Harman commended Left Behind's ability to link gameplay to story, though a late-game gameplay sequence received some criticism for feeling unnatural and forced. GamesRadar+'s Avard felt Part II's new gameplay mechanics represented a level of care and authenticity demonstrative of Naughty Dog. GameRevolution's Michael Leri lauded the cohesiveness between gameplay and narrative, and the former's ability to create empathy. Part I's improvements to gameplay were praised for their realism and intensity; some reviewers found the combat failed to compare to Part II's, though recognized it as a vast improvement of the original. The Last of Us won the Game Developers Choice Award for Best Design, for which the sequel was nominated. Both games were nominated for the British Academy Games Award for Game Design, and Part II won the inaugural Innovation in Accessibility award at The Game Awards 2020.

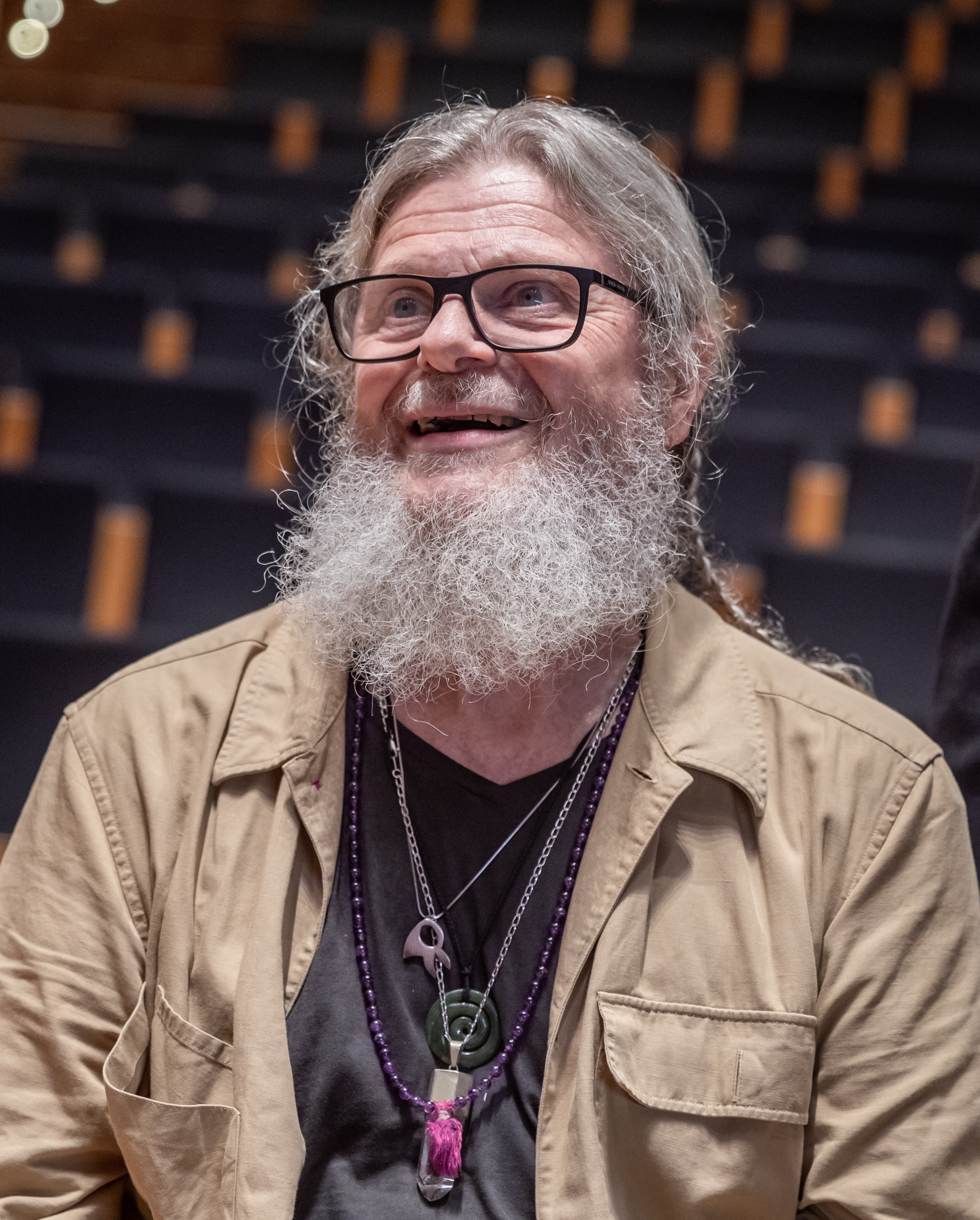
Gustavo Santaolalla's musical work on the franchise has been praised for enhancing the narratives and he received several accolades.

The use of sound has been praised for its haunting impact on gameplay; Eurogamer's Welsh considered the first game's sound design significantly better than in other games, and Vice's Rob Zacny found Part II's audio design made settings feel more lifelike in a way that the visuals occasionally failed to do. The use of 3D audio in Part I led some reviewers to play without sound or headphones; GamesRadar+'s Avard found it made the Infected more terrifying. The first game won awards for sound design at the British Academy Games Awards, D.I.C.E. Awards, Game Audio Network Guild Awards, and SXSW Gaming Awards; the sequel won at the Game Audio Network Guild Awards and Golden Joystick Awards, and received nominations at several others. Santaolalla's score for both games was described as "haunting" by some reviewers; Destructoid's James Stephanie Sterling felt it complemented the gameplay in the first game, and IGN's Dornbush found it moving in the second. The first game won Excellence in Musical Score at the SXSW Gaming Awards, and the second won Best OST at the Titanium Awards; both games received music nominations at the British Academy Games Awards, Game Audio Network Guild Awards, and New York Game Awards.

The series has received praise for its depiction of female and LGBT characters. Edge's Jason Killingsworth found the first game's lack of sexualized female characters refreshing, and Eurogamer's Ellie Gibson praised Ellie as "sometimes strong, sometimes vulnerable, but never a cliché". GayGamer.net's Sam Einhorn felt the revelation of Bill's sexuality "added to his character ... without really tokenizing him", and American organization GLAAD named Bill one of the year's "most intriguing new LGBT characters". The kiss shared by Ellie and Riley in Left Behind was described as a "breakthrough moment" and "a big deal" by Kotaku's Kirk Hamilton, and "beautiful and natural and funny" by IGN's Keza MacDonald. Some members of the transgender community objected to the representation of Part II's Lev, a transgender supporting character; criticism focused on villains using his dead name, that the character was created by cisgender writers, and the use of trans stories as tragedies. VG247's Stacey Henly responded Lev's dead name is used sparingly and Ian Alexander, a transgender actor, provided the character's voice and motion capture; Paste's Waverly praised the choice to have Lev played by a transgender actor but felt there was too much emphasis on his gender identity and the suffering he experienced for it.

The Last of Us is one of the best-selling PlayStation 3 games, and Remastered and Part II are among the best-selling PlayStation 4 games. The first game sold over 1.3 million units within seven days, and 3.4 million within three weeks, becoming the biggest launch of an original game since 2011's L.A. Noire. It was the tenth-best-selling game of 2013. By April 2018, The Last of Us and Remastered had sold 17 million copies in total. The Last of Us Part II sold over four million copies worldwide in its release weekend, becoming the fastest-selling PlayStation 4 exclusive, beating Marvel's Spider-Man's 3.3 million and God of War's 3.1 million in the same period. By June 2022, Part II had sold through over ten million copies worldwide. As of December 2022, the franchise had sold more than 37 million copies.

=== Television series ===
Critical response of The Last of Us
Season	Rotten Tomatoes	Metacritic
1	96% (489 reviews)	84 (44 reviews)
2	92% (270 reviews)	81 (44 reviews)

The television adaptation has an average approval rating of 94% on review aggregator Rotten Tomatoes and a weighted average score of 83/100 on Metacritic, indicating "universal acclaim". Several reviewers considered it the best adaptation of a video game; GameSpot's Mark Delaney called it "the beginning of a new era" for the genre. Reviewers praised the differences from the game's narrative, and some believed the scenes lifted directly were among the weakest and led to pacing issues. The cast's performances received widespread acclaim, with critics singling out Pascal and Ramsey's chemistry. Critics felt the second season reinforced The Last of Us as the best video game adaptation; The deeper themes and more complex characters were praised, though some reviewers found the quicker pace detrimental and the narrative unsatisfyingly incomplete.

The Last of Us is the first live-action video game adaptation to receive major awards consideration. The first season received 24 nominations at the 75th Primetime Emmy Awards, with a leading eight wins at the Creative Arts Emmy Awards, while the second season earned 17 nominations at the 77th Primetime Emmy Awards. From major guilds, it won two awards at the Screen Actors Guild Awards and one at the Directors Guild of America Awards and Writers Guild of America Awards, and received two nominations at the Producers Guild of America Awards. It was nominated for three Critics' Choice Television Awards, three Golden Globe Awards, and five TCA Awards, and led the Astra Creative Arts TV Awards with six nominations. In genre awards, the series was nominated for five Saturn Awards. It led the MTV Movie & TV Awards with three wins, including Best Show, and was nominated for six awards at the People's Choice Awards, including Show of the Year. The series won a Peabody Award for Entertainment.
