= Saving Grace (American TV series) =

American crime drama television series

- Genre: Crime drama; Fantasy
- Created by: Nancy Miller
- Starring: Holly Hunter; Leon Rippy; Kenny Johnson; Laura San Giacomo; Bailey Chase; Gregory Norman Cruz; Lorraine Toussaint; Dylan Minnette; Bokeem Woodbine; Tom Irwin; Yaani King
- Opening theme: "Saving Grace" by Everlast
- Composers: Erik Schrody; Keefus Ciancia; Susan Marder
- Country of origin: United States
- Original language: English
- No. of seasons: 3
- No. of episodes: 46 (list of episodes)

Production
- Executive producers: Holly Hunter; Artie Mandelberg; Nancy Miller; Gary A. Randall
- Producers: Holly Hunter; John Ryan
- Cinematography: John C. Finn III; Rohn Schmidt; Lex DuPont; Michael Negrin; William Wages
- Editors: Jerry U. Frizell; William B. Stich; Susanne Malles; John W. Carr; Paul Anderson; Mitchell Danton; David Handman; Geoffrey Rowland
- Running time: 40–45 minutes
- Production companies: Grand Productions; Paid My Dues Productions; Fox Television Studios

Original release
- Network: TNT
- Release: July 23, 2007 – June 21, 2010

Saving Grace is an American crime drama television series that aired on TNT from July 23, 2007, to June 21, 2010. The show stars Holly Hunter as well as Leon Rippy, Kenny Johnson, Laura San Giacomo, Bailey Chase, Bokeem Woodbine, Gregory Norman Cruz and Yaani King. It is set in Oklahoma City—including numerous shots of local buildings and landmarks (such as the Oklahoma City National Memorial and the downtown skyline)—while much of the show was filmed in Vancouver and Los Angeles.

== Plot ==
The plot focuses on Grace Hanadarko (Holly Hunter), a tough Oklahoma City detective who drinks heavily and is free about sex. In the series opener, Grace meets up with her "last-chance" angel when, after a night of drinking, she runs down and kills a pedestrian while driving her Porsche.

In desperation, she calls out for God's help; and a scruffy, tobacco-spitting man, who calls himself Earl (Leon Rippy), appears. Unfolding his wings to reveal his divine origins, Earl tells her that she is headed for Hell and asks if she is ready to turn her life over to God. When he finally disappears, the person she struck is also gone and it is as if the accident never happened. The only evidence left is a small amount of the victim's blood on her blouse. She takes it to her best friend, forensic science expert Rhetta Rodriguez (Laura San Giacomo), to analyze. With Rhetta's help, Grace discovers that the victim in her accident is a man awaiting execution on death row, Leon Cooley (Bokeem Woodbine). When she visits Cooley in prison, he reveals that he has also had encounters with Earl.

Passionate in her job, Grace investigates homicides and other major crimes with the other detectives in her squad. These include Ham Dewey (Kenny Johnson), Butch Ada (Bailey Chase), Bobby Stillwater (Gregory Cruz), and Captain Kate Perry (Lorraine Toussaint).

Off the job, Grace continues to drink heavily, engages in numerous one-night stands and casual encounters with men, and is having an affair with her police partner Ham, who is married. She loves her young nephew, Clay (Dylan Minnette), and devotes a great deal of time to him.

Earl appears to Grace throughout the series, hoping she'll turn away from her more self-destructive tendencies and seek God's help. Saving Grace uses Grace's story to discuss the topic of faith and how difficult faith can be in such an imperfect world.

=== Oklahoma City ===
Series creator Nancy Miller grew up in Oklahoma City. She includes many references to Oklahoma City and the state of Oklahoma in the series. For instance, many of the characters' last names are the names of Oklahoma towns: Hanadarko is derived from Anadarko; also Clay Norman, Ham Dewey, Butch Ada, Bobby Stillwater, and Captain Perry all have last names derived from local towns and cities.

The 1995 bombing of Oklahoma City's Alfred P. Murrah Federal Building and its aftermath have been frequently incorporated into the plot and character development of the series. In the show, Grace's sister, who is Clay's mother, died in the bombing.

In addition, local Oklahoma City eating establishment Johnnies Charcoal Broiler is frequently referenced.

In October 2007 the cast, writers and producers travelled to the city for a special event: Mayor Mick Cornett presented Miller and Hunter with Keys to the City.

== Episodes ==
Season	Episodes	Originally released	
Season	Episodes	First released	Last released
1	13	July 23, 2007	December 18, 2007
2	14	July 14, 2008	April 13, 2009
3	19	June 16, 2009	June 21, 2010

== Cast and characters ==
=== Main ===
- Holly Hunter as Det. Grace Hanadarko
- Leon Rippy as Earl
- Kenny Johnson as Det. Hamilton "Ham" Dewey
- Bailey Chase as Det. Butch Ada
- Bokeem Woodbine as Leon Cooley (seasons 1–2; guest season 3)
- Laura San Giacomo as Rhetta Rodriguez
- Gregory Norman Cruz as Det. Bobby Stillwater (seasons 2–3; recurring season 1)
- Dylan Minnette as Clay Norman (seasons 2–3; recurring season 1)
- Lorraine Toussaint as Captain Kate Perry (seasons 2–3; recurring season 1)
- Yaani King as Neely Lloyd (season 3)
- Haley Pullos as Carly Reed (season 2-3; recurring season 2)

=== Recurring ===
- Tom Irwin as Father Johnny Hanadarko
- Mark L. Taylor as Henry Silver
- Kristen Alderson as Katie Reed (season 2)

== Production ==
Following a 13-episode first season which ran from July 23 to December 18, 2007, Saving Grace ran for a second season of 14 episodes which began on July 14, 2008, and ended on April 13, 2009. The second season was split; the first half ran in the summer of 2008, and the second half ran in the spring of 2009. The third season of Saving Grace began airing on June 16, 2009, shifting from the Monday night slot it had occupied for the first two seasons to Tuesday night.

On August 13, 2009, the show's producer, Fox Television Studios, canceled the series, despite its high ratings, due to disappointing overseas and DVD sales. TNT had originally ordered a split 15-episode third season, with nine episodes to be aired in the summer and six to be aired in the winter of 2009. Due to the show's cancellation, the summer season ended with ten episodes (one episode, "What Would You Do?", slated for season 2, was delayed until season 3, adding one to the nine originally ordered for the summer), and in March 2010 TNT began airing what were advertised as the final episodes. These were the six remaining episodes of the season, with three new episodes added to give the series closure. The final episode of Saving Grace aired on June 21, 2010.

== DVD releases ==
Title	Season 1	Season 2	The Final Season
Release date	July 15, 2008	June 16, 2009	July 13, 2010
# of eps	13 Episodes	14 Episodes	19 Episodes
# of discs	4	4	5

The 19 episodes that aired June–August 2009 and March–June 2010 were released collectively as a third and final season.

== International broadcasts ==
UK: Season 1 began on More4 on Monday 29 August 2009 at 11:00 P.M. Season 2 began after a considerable gap on Thursday 26 January 2012 at 10:35 P.M.

Portugal: Season 1 and 2 already have been broadcast on Fox Life.

- Season 1 - Thursday at 9:00 P.M.
- Season 2 - Monday at 9:50 P.M.

The third season started airing on Fox Next which also aired reruns of the previous two seasons.

In Australia, Season 1 has just begun airing on 9 August 2011 on Channel 10 at midnight most week nights.

Japan: Season 1 began on 14 December 2008. Season 2 began on 11 December 2009.

In Quebec, Canada, the series began airing in French on SériesPlus from March 5, 2009, on Thursday nights at 9:00 P.M. On March 16, 2010, when season two of the series began, it had its timeslot changed to Tuesday nights at 9:00 P.M. replacing Bones after its fourth season concluded. The channel decided to air the 10 episodes of the final season following the second season.

== Reception ==
=== Critical reception ===
- The New York Post; Reviewed by: Adam Buckman; Grade: 100; Both The Closer and Saving Grace are at the top of their games in tonight's premiere episodes.
- New York Daily News; Reviewed by: David Hinckley; Grade: 80; This will be good news to people who enjoy watching train wrecks in which the engineer accelerates as the precipice nears, which is Grace's signature move.

=== U.S. ratings ===
Season	Timeslot	Season premiere				Season finale				Viewers Total (in millions)	Viewers Age 18-49 (in millions)	Viewers Age 25-54 (in millions)
Season	Timeslot	Date	Viewers Total (in millions)	Viewers 18-49 (in millions)	Viewers 25-54 (in millions)	Date	Viewers Total (in millions)	Viewers 18-49 (in millions)	Viewers 25-54 (in millions)	Viewers Total (in millions)	Viewers Age 18-49 (in millions)	Viewers Age 25-54 (in millions)
1st	Monday 10:00PM	July 23, 2007	6.4	1.94	2.47	December 18, 2007						
2nd	Monday 10:00PM	July 14, 2008	5.2	1.61	2.29	April 13, 2009						
3rd	Tuesday/Monday 10:00PM	June 16, 2009	3.5		1.6	June 21, 2010						

For calendar-year 2008 on a first-run basis, the series garnered 1.59 million adults in the 18-49 demo.
