= List of Saving Grace episodes =

The following is an episode list for the TNT crime drama Saving Grace. It premiered on July 23, 2007, and ended on June 21, 2010, with a total of 46 episodes over the course of three seasons.

== Series overview ==
Season	Episodes	Originally released	
Season	Episodes	First released	Last released
1	13	July 23, 2007	December 18, 2007
2	14	July 14, 2008	April 13, 2009
3	19	June 16, 2009	June 21, 2010

== Episodes ==
=== Season 1 (2007) ===
No. overall	No. in season	Title	Directed by	Written by	Original release date	Prod. code	U.S. viewers (millions)
1	1	"Pilot" "In the Beginning"	Sergio Mimica-Gezzan	Nancy Miller	July 23, 2007	10090-05-179	6.42
Grace Hanadarko is a police detective who lives a reckless life, drinking heavily and sleeping around. After a night of drinking, Grace hits a man with her car, and in the desperate aftermath encounters a scruffy, tobacco-spitting angel named Earl. He gives her a chance to change her ways, and afterwards all traces of her accident disappear; but it won't be that easy. Meanwhile, Grace and her partner investigate the abduction of a little girl, and are on the trail of the pedophile thought to be responsible. They eventually find the girl, and the cornered pedophile commits suicide.
2	2	"Bring it On, Earl"	Guy Ferland	Nancy Miller	July 30, 2007	5035-07-101	5.37
While the squad investigates the death of a man found bludgeoned in his oilfield, Ham shows his jealous side when he discovers that Grace and Butch were once an item. Annoyed by Earl's attempts to interject himself into her life, Grace challenges him to a wrestling match, with the prize being either his exit or Grace's surrender to God's plan. Earl accepts and transports them both to a mountaintop arena in Athens, Greece. The match ends in a draw, but it gets Grace's attention, and she visits Leon Cooley in prison to learn more about Earl. Meanwhile, a witness in the murder case turns out to be Lt. Yukon's brother Otis, and old family conflict flares up when he's brought in for questioning. Later, Otis comes in demanding his reward money, and when he's refused he pulls out a gun and kills his brother.
3	3	"Bless Me Father, For I Have Sinned"	Dean White	Joseph Dougherty	August 6, 2007	5035-07-102	4.80
A motel manager is murdered and the suspect seeks sanctuary in a church, forcing the squad to negotiate with the priest protecting her. The motel is frequented by hookers and their johns, so the squad gets help on the case from a streetwalker and a man who has been secretly filming the motel's guests. Meanwhile, Earl sets up shrines and artifacts from a multitude of faiths in Grace's home hoping she'll pick a path that suits her best, but Grace's disrespect for him draws Earl's anger. Rhetta confides in Grace's brother, a Catholic priest, about Grace's visits from Earl, and shows him "Holy Cow", a bovine whose mottles resemble the face of Christ; but he is skeptical. Meanwhile, Captain Kate Perry, an old friend of Grace's from her days on Oklahoma City's vice squad, arrives to take the place of the late Lt. Yukon as supervisor of Major Crimes.
4	4	"Keep Your Damn Wings Off My Nephew"	Sergio Mimica-Gezzan	Roger Wolfson	August 13, 2007	5035-07-104	4.68
Grace is alarmed when she sees an apparition of Leon Cooley talking with her nephew Clay on the street, and angrily confronts both Leon and Earl about the encounter. Meanwhile, Earl continues to be cryptic, first leading Grace to a taco stand and then to a house with a purple door. Wade, a devoutly religious teenager, is a witness to a murder, and faces threats to his life. Grace moves Wade in with her for his protection, and the squad goes on rotation to watch over him.
5	5	"Would You Want Me to Tell You?"	David Von Ancken	Hans Tobeason	August 20, 2007	5035-07-103	4.46
With the surprise visit of her Aunt Cathy (Frances Fisher), Grace finds herself in the middle of old family tension at the same time that her late father's memory is set to be honored. Cathy reveals to Grace that she is dying, and tells her a terrible secret which she hopes to confess to Grace's mother before she goes. Grace takes harsh measures to prevent that from happening. Meanwhile, cattle baron Alvin Green enlists Grace and the squad's help in the recovery of a prized statue. Later, Grace shows her compassionate side to a co-worker grieving the loss of a beloved pet.
6	6	"And You Wonder Why I Lie"	Gloria Muzio	Annie Brunner	August 27, 2007	5035-07-106	4.21
In a game of "truth or dare", Earl dares Grace to stop lying. Later, the squad investigates the brutal rape and murder of a young woman whose body was dumped in the street. It's uncovered that the victim was a journalist investigating the lives of prostitutes by actually living as one. At a party, Grace first has to deal with a tense face-off when she runs into Ham's wife, and then with Rhetta's wrath when she finds out Grace lied about how a piece of evidence was found. Meanwhile, the squad traces the murder to a backwoods prostitution ring, and discover even more heinous crimes.
7	7	"Yeehaw, Geepaw"	Artie Mandelberg	Denitria Harris-Lawrence	September 3, 2007	5035-07-105	4.62
When a body burned and buried face down with an owl feather shows signs of a Native American ritual, Grace goes to her Choctaw grandfather, Geepaw (August Schellenberg), for insight. As she spends time with Geepaw, Grace finds that he is steadily losing his ability to take care of himself, and is heart-broken to learn that he's in the early stages of Alzheimer's. Meanwhile, Paige hounds Grace about joining the family on a cruise.
8	8	"Everything's Got a Shelf Life"	Artie Mandelberg	Talicia Raggs	September 10, 2007	5035-07-108	5.10
While serving a no knock warrant on a murder suspect, the team is involved in a shootout in which Grace and another officer are downed by gunfire. Grace's life is saved by her body armor, but the other officer dies of his wounds shortly after. His death has Grace and the squad champing at the bit to take down the gang responsible. Meanwhile, Leon is conflicted and angry when he learns that his ex-wife wants to remarry, and that her fiancée wants to adopt Leon's son.
9	9	"A Language of Angels"	Tricia Brock	Mark Israel	September 17, 2007	5035-07-107	3.95
When her partner in bondage games runs off, a helpless Grace is cuffed to her bed naked for hours, and Earl takes the opportunity to spend some quality time with her. Meanwhile, a woman is found murdered with the word "Devil" written on the wall in the victim's blood. Grace has seen this before, and she is forced to reveal long-secret personal trauma in order to help find the killer. Doug Norman is concerned when he finds out that Clay has been mistreating a girl at school, and Aunt Grace uses tough tactics to set Clay straight. Meanwhile, Earl is frustrated with Grace's personal progress, and Rhetta starts to piece together the evidence Earl has left behind into "a language of angels". (Midseason Finale)
10	10	"It's Better When I Can See You"	Artie Mandelberg	Joseph Dougherty & Roger Wolfson	December 3, 2007	5035-07-110	3.00
As Grace investigates a school bus company whose shoddy practices may have led to a deadly accident, a slew of tornadoes hits the city. In the aftermath she is trapped inside the company's offices with a seriously injured employee (Mary Kay Place), and through the ordeal her faith and compassion are tested. Meanwhile, Leon Cooley's life is threatened by a vengeful guard, and he and Earl might part ways as Leon converts to Islam.
11	11	"This is Way Too Normal for You"	Tom McLoughlin	Annie Brunner & Hans Tobeason	December 10, 2007	5035-07-109	N/A
The squad investigates the death of a man with down syndrome who was shot while attempting armed robbery with a gun carved from wood. Following the trail to a home for the mentally disabled, Grace spends time with the man's friend in order to find the origin of the fake gun. Meanwhile, the atheist nephew of Grace's neighbor is in town, and he and Grace immediately hit it off, much to Earl's bemusement.
12	12	"Is There a Scarlet Letter on My Breast?"	Guy Ferland	Mark Israel & Denitria Harris-Lawrence	December 17, 2007	5035-07-111	2.32
High-profile defense attorney Harper Addison rolls into town determined to free his client, and he targets the squad hoping to find cracks in their investigation. An assistant D.A. tries to prepare the team for Addison's ruthless tactics. The squad is caught off guard when he deposes a parade of Grace's former lovers and marches them through the squadroom. Meanwhile, Grace feels the pressure from her family, Earl, and a pair of nuns when she waffles on whether to attend Clay's confirmation. Later, Ham throws his true feelings out there with Grace.
13	13	"Tacos, Tulips, Ducks, and Spices"	Artie Mandelberg	Talicia Raggs & Nancy Miller	December 18, 2007	5035-07-112	2.22
When a charred car is found with an abduction kit and pictures of Paige inside, Grace is forced to dig into her sister's life to keep her safe. Meanwhile, all of Grace's siblings come to town to celebrate their mother's birthday. At the station, Earl's clues lead Rhetta to Father Patrick Murphy, a pedophile priest whom everyone thought was dead, but is actually living in retirement in Tulsa. Grace does not take the news of his survival well, and tells Rhetta the full story of how Murphy repeatedly molested and raped her in her preteen years. Unable to hold back her anger, Grace heads to Tulsa with her gun in hand, and breaks into the room of the sleeping Father Murphy, leading to a stunning cliffhanger.

=== Season 2 (2008–09) ===
No. overall	No. in season	Title	Directed by	Written by	Original release date	Prod. code	U.S. viewers (millions)
14	1	"Have a Seat, Earl"	Artie Mandelberg	Nancy Miller	July 14, 2008	5035-08-201	5.20
Grace spots a carjacker in Bricktown, and a shootout and pursuit begins. In the ensuing chase the suspect flees, jumping from a bridge to his death, while the police dog that pursued him is severely injured in the fall. When it turns out the carjacker was on the FBI's most wanted list, Grace is hailed as a hero, but allegations of her drinking on the job brings an IA investigation against her. Meanwhile, Grace returns home, unrolling Father Murphy, still in his pajamas, from a rug in which she had kept him. After she spends the night trying to get up the nerve to kill him, Grace finally brings Murphy in to be brought to justice. Later, he is found murdered in the streets after being released on bond. Grace confronts the woman whose false allegations initiated the IA investigation, discovering that she was a friend of her late sister, who blames Grace for her death. Meanwhile, Grace allows the suspect in Murphy's murder to flee, after which she learns he's guilty of much more.
15	2	"A Survivor Lives Here"	Guy Ferland	Mark Israel & Talicia Raggs	July 21, 2008	5035-08-202	4.57
After another late-night romp, Ham reveals to Grace that he had left his wife months before. When Clay shows up the next morning he finds Ham's underwear, leading him to question his aunt on her relationship with the married Ham. Later, Grace is called to a crime scene with a trail of blood and no body, and learns it is the home of close friends of hers, a mother (Dee Wallace) and son who lost their husband and father in the Murrah building bombing. The son, whom Grace has known since he was a little boy, becomes a suspect in the disappearance of a young woman. In the meantime Clay takes Gus for a walk in the park and loses him, leading to a frantic search for the missing dog.
16	3	"A Little Hometown Love"	Adam Davidson	Hans Tobeason & Roger Wolfson	July 28, 2008	5035-08-203	4.78
At a party at Louie's, a soon-to-be-retired OCPD employee has his throat cut in the men's room, just outside the stall where Grace and Ham are fooling around. The nature of the slaying indicates it might have been murder-for-hire, and the detectives scour video footage from the party for the killer. The search for a motive eventually leads to the employee's eccentric wife (Amy Madigan). Ham's brother Rafe is home from fighting in Afghanistan, and Grace and Leon Cooley have dreams and visions about each other, fueling Rhetta's curiosity as to what Earl may be up to.
17	4	"It's a Fierce, White-Hot Mighty Love"	Gary A. Randall	Annie Brunner	August 4, 2008	5035-08-204	4.94
Clay joins the Police Explorers, and confronts Ham about his affair with Grace. The appearance of a troubled sister and brother in the squadroom leads to an investigation into their missing mother. Clay's stint in the explorers is short-lived due to his father's disapproval.
18	5	"Do You Love Him?"	Artie Mandelberg	Joseph Dougherty & Denitria Harris-Lawrence	August 11, 2008	5035-08-205	3.54
After working security at his art show, Grace is met with hostility from Ham's brother Nick, who disapproves of her relationship with Ham. That same night the door of Grace's Porsche is knocked off by a speeding car, sending a long-hidden stash of money flying all over the parking lot. An investigation leads to an inquiry into the car's past owners, and the connection of the cash with a casino robbery where an officer was killed almost thirty years earlier. Ham's brother Rafe goes missing in Afghanistan, sending Ham into emotional turmoil. Rafe is finally rescued, but he dies of his wounds before he makes it home. Oklahoma football coach Barry Switzer makes a guest appearance playing himself as one of the former owners of Grace's car.
19	6	"Are You an Indian Princess?"	Gwyneth Horder-Payton	Mark Israel & Roger Wolfson	August 18, 2008	5035-08-206	3.78
Ham struggles with grief over his brother's death, and pulls away from Grace to find comfort elsewhere. When the squad is faced with a woman's murder and the horrific burning of a little boy, Grace stakes out the hospital under the guise of the boy's doctor to catch the perpetrator. The squad has difficulty keeping their anger in check when he is finally caught. Butch is left without a partner as Bobby goes deep undercover on a case.
20	7	"You Are My Partner"	Gary A. Randall	Hans Tobeason	August 25, 2008	5035-08-207	4.27
An illegal immigrant left at the emergency room by a racist skinhead is found to be the victim of sexual assault, and dies of her injuries. This leads to the interrogation of the highly belligerent suspect, but things may not be as they seem. Meanwhile, a grief-stricken Ham has greater and greater lapses of self-control, from taking off his clothes at a charity fundraiser, to knocking a well-meaning Earl off his bar stool with a right hook. After Ham loses it in the squadroom, Captain Perry is forced to confront him on his behavior. Later, a panic attack sends Ham to the hospital. As Grace tries to help her troubled partner, Ham finally tells her what the real problem is, and that things have to change. (Summer Finale)
21	8	"The Heart of a Cop"	Artie Mandelberg	Denitria Harris-Lawrence	March 2, 2009	5035-08-208	2.50
While Bobby continues his undercover assignment, Butch is partnered with Ham, and Grace is partnered with a young uniform officer on rotation, Abby Charles (Christina Ricci), who struggles right out of the gate. With the grisly murder of a young woman matching other recent homicides, the squad finds it has a serial killer on its hands. The murders drive a frightened Paige, all alone with her family out of town, to move in with Grace. Meanwhile, at Leon Cooley's own request his execution date is pushed up and looms even closer, so Earl tries to bolster Leon's faith and spur Grace's compassion. Rhetta happens upon Leon's case in the evidence room and begins to explore it.
22	9	"Do You Believe in Second Chances?"	Elodie Keene	Joseph Dougherty	March 9, 2009	5035-08-209	2.34
Grace's niece Sayre participates in a drug party where her best friend falls into a coma and later dies, and she faces possible charges in the death. The trail of the tainted drug responsible leads to a prostitute runaway, and finally a drug-dealing trucker, and they investigate of 16-year-old Katie Reed (Kristen Alderson) she also becomes a victim of a drug abuse ever since her boyfriend broke up with her. Things get tense between Grace and Abby when Abby makes inappropriate contact with an outside agency during an investigation. Later, Abby's poor choices leave Grace vulnerable during a dangerous stand-off at a truck stop. Meanwhile, Father Johnny is involved with an anti-death penalty program, through which he meets Leon Cooley, and subsequently grows closer to believing in Grace's encounters with Earl.
23	10	"Take Me Somewhere, Earl"	Tricia Brock	Annie Brunner	March 16, 2009	5035-08-210	2.34
While Grace and Abby investigate a murder at an apartment complex, Abby is met with hostility by a fellow patrol officer. Butch and Ham raid one of the apartments and run across Bobby, who is still undercover. As a result Bobby is forced to come out from his cover and return to the squad. He returns with a distrust of Butch, and other issues stemming from the unsavory assignment. Meanwhile, the hostility Abby garners from her fellow officers prompts Grace to investigate why she was picked for the rotation, and she's shocked to discover that Abby was placed there by internal affairs. Her cover blown, Abby is pulled from the squad, but not before Grace and the guys let her know how they feel. Meanwhile, Father Johnny and Rhetta convince a relative of Leon's victim to work on his behalf, but Leon is less than willing to accept the help.
24	11	"The Live Ones"	Artie Mandelberg	Mark Israel & Suzan Olson	March 23, 2009	5035-08-211	2.06
The squad investigates the deaths of two women at the home of architect William Drugh (Elias Koteas), whose unorthodox views on sex and relationships pique Grace's curiosity. While participating in Police Explorers, Clay makes friends with Leon Cooley's son Benjamin. Meanwhile, Earl continues to work on Leon's faith as his execution draws closer. Haunted by the things he witnessed while working undercover, Bobby struggles with anger, and his continued suspicions of Butch. In the line of investigating William Drugh, Grace is drawn into his world of tantric wisdom, and uses the lessons learned to help Bobby deal with his anger.
25	12	"But There's Clay"	Rod Hardy	Denitria Harris-Lawrence & Talicia Raggs	March 30, 2009	5035-08-213	2.00
Grace discovers to her consternation that Clay's father Doug is dating Maggie (Kathy Baker), a new bartender at Louie's, just as Clay worries that Doug may be looking for out-of-state employment, and a 11-year-old Carly Reed (Haley Pullos) who was a victim of a domestic victim, until she meets a boy and a love interest Clay, who helps her and comforts her as a puppy love crush. A girl's murder has the squad searching for answers for a grieving father, as another father in a long-unsolved case hounds Grace for resolution. Meanwhile, Leon receives a visit from an old high school classmate, causing him to soften his tough exterior. And as the Hanadarko clan tries to come to terms with Doug's plans for marriage, Grace enlists Rhetta's help to do a little deeper digging into Maggie's background.
26	13	"So What's the Purpose of a Platypus?"	Rohn Schmidt	Mark Israel	April 6, 2009	5035-08-214	2.54
As the Hanadarkos prepare for Doug's wedding, a robbery during Maggie's shift at Louie's leaves her badly bloodied. Doug fears for Maggie's safety, and it's decided that she should stay with Grace. While working on Leon's case for clemency, Father Johnny and Rhetta watch a damning video of the incident which put him on death row, just as Benjamin Cooley walks in on them. Grace's house is allegedly invaded as Maggie is alone there, but Grace catches her lying about what happened. Later, Grace finds evidence that Maggie was having sex on her couch, which she takes to Rhetta to confirm. As the squad investigates, they find Maggie has a connection with a conman who preys on victims of tragedy, with a penchant for kidnapping. For Clay's protection Grace sends him away, and an outraged Doug has Grace arrested for it. As they are both locked in the holding cells, Grace pulls a confession out of Maggie, and on the outside the guys catch up with her conman partner. Meanwhile, despite a strong letter-writing campaign, Leon's appeal for clemency is denied.
27	14	"I Believe in Angels"	Artie Mandelberg	Nancy Miller & Roger Wolfson	April 13, 2009	5035-08-215	2.24
As Grace and Rhetta have the same dream where Grace is shot during a convenience store robbery, they set out to search the dream's real-world setting, a local gas station, for clues. As they search, they have a face-to-face encounter with a girl from the dream. On death row, Leon's execution date is upon him, and Earl draws near to give him strength. Meanwhile, Grace watches an old family video and discovers to her shock that Leon was friends with her late sister Mary Frances. As Grace begins to understand why God brought her and Leon together, she gains a strong desire to save him from his fate. She makes repeated calls to the governor, and even stops his motorcade in order to plead Leon's case. The efforts prove fruitless however, and Father Johnny, Rhetta, and finally Grace all go to Leon's side before his execution takes place. Meanwhile, the squad is called when a home intruder is shot dead by a gun-toting grandma, but the case may not be as open and shut as it seems. Also, Ham gets the word that his divorce has been finalized, but closure is still needed, and he finally gets honest with his now ex-wife. As the season closes, Grace once again finds herself at a purple door (see episode 104, Keep Your Damn Wings off My Nephew), ready to face what lies behind it.

=== Season 3 (2009–10) ===
No. overall	No. in season	Title	Directed by	Written by	Original release date	Prod. code	U.S. viewers (millions)
28	1	"We're Already Here"	Artie Mandelberg	Nancy Miller	June 16, 2009	5035-09-301	3.47
Earl starts to reach out to a drug addict with an abusive boyfriend, but she doesn't understand who he is and responds with terror. Later, Grace employs Ham in a haphazard scheme to make contact with the young addict, and it results in a shootout that leaves the girl critically injured, and Ham pistol-whipped and robbed of his badge and gun. As the squad investigates they find a connection with a ring of anti-government extremists, and uncover a plot to execute a terrorist attack at a slain policeman's funeral. Ham is frustrated with Grace's lack of honesty with him, but Grace's attempts at honesty about the existence of Earl are met with his disbelief. Meanwhile, Grace and Ham's efforts to remove the work of Texas Longhorn-fan vandals may lead to embarrassing exposure, and Butch reveals his engagement to a local TV news reporter.
29	2	"She's a Lump"	Rohn Schmidt	Mark Israel; Sybil Gardner	June 23, 2009	5035-09-302	3.16
The squad is called when a court reporter is found hanging by a rope in an apparent suicide, but as they investigate, further evidence points to murder. The victim was involved in an alcoholic's recovery group, and Grace and Ham join the meetings in order to penetrate the group's confidentiality curtain. In Grace's search for the truth, she engages in an ethically tenuous charade with one of the group's members. Meanwhile, Grace begins making hospital visits to the young addict dubbed Jane Doe, trying to reach her despite her comatose state. Ham struggles with Grace's absence and follows her, and realizes that his need for Grace may be unhealthy. Rhetta and her husband Ronnie's relationship is strained as financial woes hit, and Ronnie looks into selling the family farm. Later, the duped group member lets Grace know just how she feels about her tactics.
30	3	"Watch Siggybaby Burn"	Tricia Brock	Denitria Harris-Lawrence; Jessica Mecklenburg	June 30, 2009	5035-09-303	N/A
The Hanadarkos are targeted as Johnny is injured in a horrific bombing at his church, Leo is shot at by a sniper, and Clay's life is threatened as he unwittingly carries a bomb into the squadroom. Grace is frantic, and the squad moves to protect her family and catch the culprit. Upset as Ronnie puts the farm and her cherished family artifacts up for auction, Rhetta looks for a time capsule that she and Grace buried on the farm when they were ten years old. Meanwhile, Grace continues to visit the comatose young woman in the hospital, who is exhibiting unusual symptoms.
31	4	"What Would You Do?"	Tricia Brock	Randy Walker	July 7, 2009	5035-08-212	N/A
Grace and the squad investigate the robbery and murder of an older man found tied up with a young woman, and Ham finds that the daughter of an old friend may be involved. Meanwhile, the murder victim's angel, Matthew (F. Murray Abraham), bemoans the loss of yet another soul in his care. Assuming Earl's success is due to easier converts, Matthew sets his eye on Grace, and uses tactics far different from Earl's to win her over. Ham's fear of small birds is the fodder for practical jokes as Rhetta gets back at him for faking a lottery ticket.
32	5	"Mooooooooo"	Artie Mandelberg	Elle Johnson; Annie Brunner	July 14, 2009	5035-09-304	2.82
Earl calls Grace to the hospital as Jane Doe wakes up from her coma, but upon her arrival Grace encounters an unexpected language barrier. The squad is called to the scene where a herd of cows has been killed, and close by they find the dead body of a Hasidic Jew. The investigation draws them to the Hasidic community that runs a local meat-packing plant, and Grace learns about their customs and traditions in order to gain access. Meanwhile, Rafe's widow is in town, and she is still hurting from her loss. Later, Grace goes to visit Jane Doe in the hospital again, only to find she has checked out and disappeared.
33	6	"Am I Going to Lose Her?"	Millicent Shelton	Denitria Harris-Lawrence; Jessica Mecklenburg	July 21, 2009	5035-09-305	3.05
As the squad begins the hunt for a sadistic abductor and rapist, Grace vanishes, apparently in pursuit of a suspect. As they try to find her, the squad begins a probe of Grace's personal life and they discover her recent contact with a mentally-unstable childhood friend, Charlie Hudson. Meanwhile, Earl is just as much in the dark about Grace's whereabouts as everyone else, and he employs some special help to try to locate her. As her friends look for Grace, Charlie, suffering from a psychotic episode, has her tied up in an abandoned building. When Grace is finally found, tragedy ensues, leaving her with the loss of a dear friend, and a permanent reminder of the event.
34	7	"That Was No First Kiss"	Rohn Schmidt	Mark Israel	July 28, 2009	5035-09-306	3.16
The squad investigates the death of a 99-year-old man, who has been shot in the head while sitting at home. The circumstances of the case offer Grace and Capt. Perry an opportunity to use their expertise in gambling-related crimes from their vice days. It also gives Bobby a chance to reconnect with his dad (Wes Studi) and Ham a chance to connect with a kindred spirit. But Grace’s attention is drawn towards Rhetta, when she learns something unexpected about Ronnie.
35	8	"Popcorn"	Guy Ferland	Annie Brunner; Sybil Gardner	August 4, 2009	5035-09-307	3.11
The bizarre murder of a drug company whistleblower becomes a potential national news story for Butch’s reporter girlfriend, Kendra Burke. Grace’s brother Leo is convinced his next door neighbor is keeping a dead body in his house. And Johnny pressures Grace to arrange a chance for him to finally meet Earl.
36	9	"Looks Like a Lesbian Attack to Me"	Heather Capiello	Elle Johnson	August 11, 2009	5035-09-308	2.99
The squad investigates the death of a parole officer with secrets, while Grace and her brother Johnny finally track down Neely, the young addict who shares visions of Earl. Meanwhile, Rhetta decides to make some personal changes in the wake of her troubles at home.
37	10	"Am I Gonna Die Today?"	Tricia Brock	Mark Israel	August 18, 2009	5035-09-309	3.16
When a prominent doctor and philanthropist fatally wounds an intruder in his house, the search is on for the intruder’s accomplice. But there’s something about the doctor’s story that just doesn’t gel with Grace. Meanwhile Rhetta and Ronnie have it out once and for all. Ham breaks some interesting news to Grace. And Earl tells Grace she has to do something for Neely…but he doesn’t know what it is yet. (Summer Finale)
38	11	"Let’s Talk"	Tim Hunter	Sibyl Gardner	March 29, 2010	5035-09-314	2.20
In the immediate aftermath of Grace and Neely’s survived fall from the top of a building, Grace, now known as “Angel Cop” by the city, decides to have it out with God once and for all. But a mysterious stranger might have something to say about that. Ham struggles with his father over the fact that Ham is now dating his brother’s widow. And the squad investigates a deadly mauling by a dog.
39	12	"Hear the Birds"	Artie Mandelberg	Jessica Mecklenburg	April 5, 2010	5035-09-310	1.76
As Grace deals with the aftermath of her dramatic fall from a building with Neely, she also struggles with the impending death of her grandfather, GeePaw (guest star August Schellenberg). Meanwhile the squad investigates a double homicide involving a water dispute between two ranchers, and Rhetta discovers a secret about her daughter.
40	13	"You Can't Save Them All, Grace"	Gary A. Randall	Matt McIntyre	April 12, 2010	5035-09-311	1.80
A friend of Grace's doesn't want any help in the possible murder of her husband. The squad has little time to waste in trying to track down a missing person with brain damage. Grace tries to find out exactly when Earl began following her.
41	14	"I Killed Kristin"	Artie Mandelberg	Max Barrie, Megan Lynn & Wade Solomon	May 24, 2010	5035-09-313	1.49
Grace gets to see a new side of her nephew when a rock band is related to the murder case. Neely lives next door to Grace and begins withdrawal with help from Earl. Rhetta continues where she left off with Ronnie.
42	15	"So Help You God"	Artie Mandelberg	Mark Israel	May 31, 2010	5035-09-312	N/A
Grace answers for herself and her character, with Earl acting as her defense and her friends and family as witnesses, in a courtroom she wakes up in while visiting a friend's grave. Her past actions are related through a series of flashbacks from previous episodes.
43	16	"Loose Men in Tight Jeans"	Artie Mandelberg	Lois Johnson	June 7, 2010	5035-09-315	1.85
Grace is pulled into a rodeo mystery as the family of a dead cowboy insist that it was murder, and plead that the "angel cop", as they call Grace, investigate. A liaison with a married man has Grace in hot water with Rhetta, who with Father Johnny's help is trying to reconcile with Ronnie. Later, an accident involving Grace leads to tragedy.
44	17	"You Think I'm Gonna Eat My Gun?"	Artie Mandelberg	Bob Lowry	June 14, 2010	5035-09-316	2.51
Grace must cope with feelings of guilt after killing a child in a road accident. The team has to deal with a beheading which might be related to the sexuality of the victim. Captain Perry has an announcement that could change everything. Grace can't accept the forgiveness of the dead child's mother, who blames herself for the little girl running out of the house and into the path of Grace's car and tells Grace it was purely an accident.
45	18	"I Need You to Call Earl"	Tricia Brock	Denitria Harris-Lawrence	June 21, 2010	5035-09-317	2.34
Unable to cope with the accidental death of a child, Grace isolates herself from family and friends and goes on a drinking binge. She finally snaps when she sees Neely is still using, and responds by taping her to a chair and taking away her drugs, which she begins using herself. Grace eventually breaks off from her life altogether; she has her car junked, throws away her phone, and hitches a ride to Mexico. While in Mexico, she tries to connect to the life of the child that was killed. Wandering through the city, Grace discovers Neely in an alley, dead from a drug overdose. As the episode closes, a reeling Grace walks into the breaking waves and into the ocean.
46	19	"I'm Gonna Need a Big Night Light"	Artie Mandelberg	Mark Israel	June 21, 2010	5035-09-318	2.52
Emerging from the ocean, Grace tells Earl that she's ready to turn her life over to God. She returns to Oklahoma City to discover that her home has been burned to the ground, and learns it is connected to the stranger she first met in "Let's Talk". As Grace follows her new sense of purpose, she is led to a final showdown with the stranger, a being who is evil incarnate.
