= Devika Parikh =

American actress

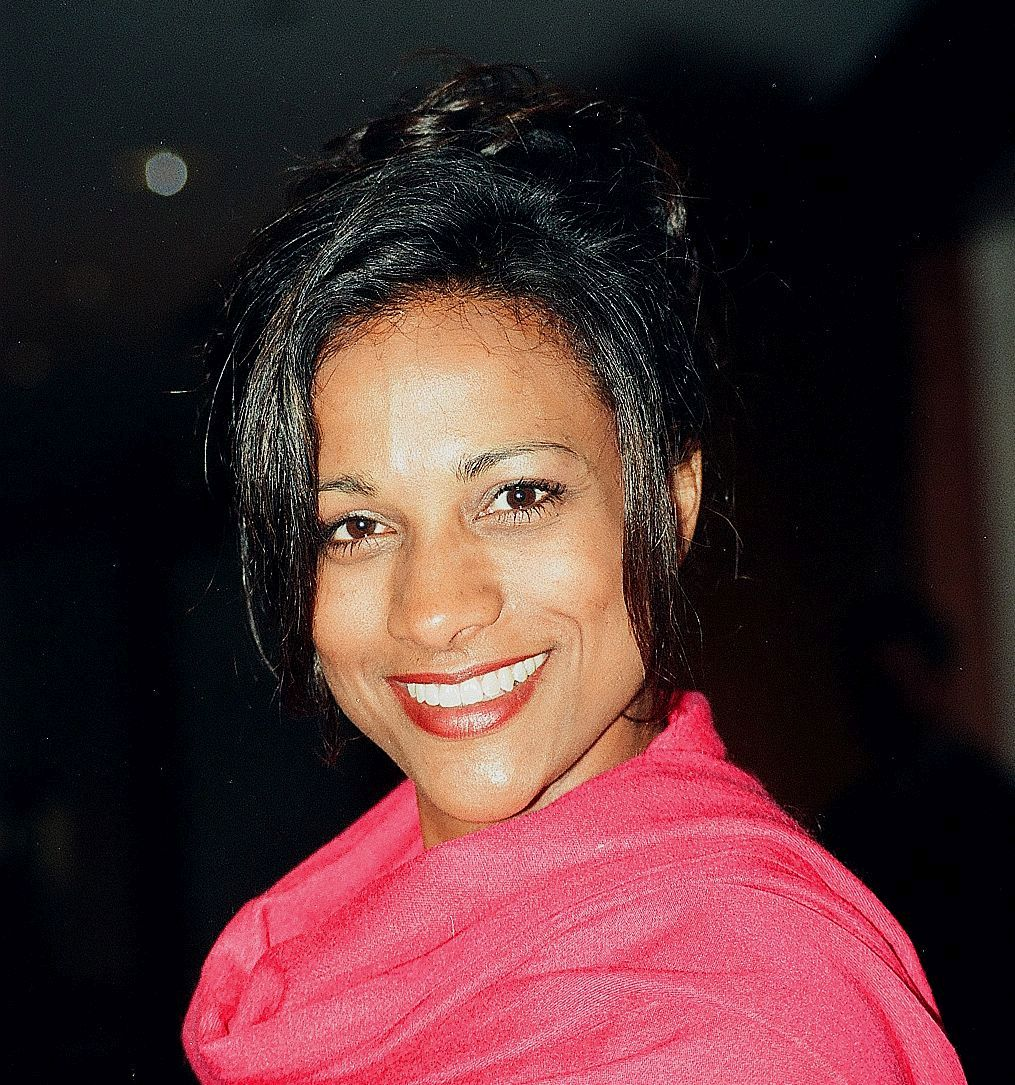
- Parikh in 2000
- Born: November 3, 1966 (age 59); Cambridge, Massachusetts, U.S.
- Occupation: Actress
- Years active: 1991–present
- Height: 1.68 m (5 ft 6 in)

Devika Parikh (born November 3, 1966) is an American actress, best known for her recurring role as Bonnie in the NBC political drama series The West Wing from 1999 to 2003.

== Life and career ==
Parikh was born in Cambridge, Massachusetts to a Gujarati Indian immigrant father from Mumbai and an African American mother. She was raised in Gaithersburg, Maryland and received a degree in broadcast journalism from Syracuse University.

Parikh has worked in television, advertisements, film, voice work and theatre. She has also performed sketch comedy/improvisation with groups at the Comedy Store, the Upfront Comedy Theatre and the Underground Improv. She has had recurring roles on television shows such as NBC's drama series The West Wing; Fox's series 24; and Showtime drama series Resurrection Blvd. She has guest-starred on Criminal Minds, That's So Raven, The Parkers, Bones, Shameless and Grey's Anatomy. In 2022, Parikh was cast in her first series regular role, in the Oprah Winfrey Network prime time soap opera, The Kings of Napa.

== Selected filmography ==
=== Film ===
- 1997 How to Be a Player as Barbara
- 1999 Judgment Day as Officer Rhonda Reese
- 2000 Dancing in September as Cheryl Reed
- 2003 S.W.A.T. as Jail Intake Reporter
- 2005 Madagascar as News Reporter (voice)
- 2009 Ice Age: Dawn of the Dinosaurs as Additional Voices
- 2011 A Bag of Hammers as Interviewer 1
- 2017 The Star as Additional Voices
- 2018 Aquaman as Newscaster Morgan
- 2018 Spider-Man: Into the Spider-Verse as Additional Voices

=== Television ===
- 1993 The Fresh Prince of Bel-Air as Gayle - 1 episode
- 1996 The Wayans Bros as Dee's sister Natalie - 1 episode
- 1999–2003 The West Wing as Bonnie – 41 episodes
- 2001 Frasier - Season 8 Episode 9 Frasier's Edge as the Emcee
- 2001–2002 24 as Maureen Kingsley – 4 episodes
- 2005 That's So Raven as Yolanda – 2 episodes
- 2019 Grey's Anatomy as Nancy Klein – 3 episodes
- 2020 General Hospital as Ms. Madigan – 2 episodes
- 2022 The Kings of Napa as Melanie Pierce – 8 episodes

=== Video games ===
- 2013 Grand Theft Auto V as The Local Population
- 2019 Fallout 76: Wild Appalachia DLC as Janelle Priblo / Mary Tinley / Brother of Steel Dispatcher
- 2019 Rage 2 as Goon Shielder / Gunbarrel Civilian / Lagooney Civilian / Oasis Civilian
- 2020 The Walking Dead: Saints & Sinners as Radio Announcer / Additional Voices
