= Deliverance Creek =

2014 TV film

- Film poster
- Written by: Melissa Carter
- Directed by: Jon Amiel
- Starring: Lauren Ambrose
- Music by: Jim Dooley
- Country of origin: United States
- Original language: English

Production
- Executive producers: Jon Amiel; Melissa Carter; Theresa Park; Nicholas Sparks
- Producer: Peter Burrell
- Cinematography: Theo van de Sande
- Editor: Josh Beal
- Running time: 87 minutes
- Production company: Ostar Productions

Original release
- Network: Lifetime
- Release: September 13, 2014

Deliverance Creek is a 2014 American Civil War drama film directed by Jon Amiel and written by Melissa Carter. It premiered on the Lifetime Network on September 13, 2014. It was produced by Nicholas Sparks.

The film has been described as having a hodge-podge of cobbled-together storylines and as a backdoor pilot. For the film, Carter won the Writers Guild of America Award in 2015 for Outstanding Script, in the "Original Long form" category.

== Plot ==
Set two years after the commencement of the American Civil War, it is loosely centered around events connected to Belle Gaitlin Barlow (Lauren Ambrose). Deliverance Creek is where the Union troop's pay will be delivered, so a group of Union deserters go there to intercept it.

Belle lives in Deliverance Creek with her children, trying to maintain the farm, as her husband Harlan left to fight in the war and is presumed dead. Belle is involved with Deputy Nate Cooper (Wes Ramsey).

Belle's neighbour Jeb Crawford (Barry Tubb), hits on her, but she rejects his advances. When he returns home, he complains about their run-in and his wife Cordelia (Katherine Willis) notices the slap mark on his face.

In Arkansas, Kessie (Yaani King), a slave, sneaks her family off the plantation to avoid being separated, as her husband Moses is to be sold at a slave auction. When the owner finds them missing he vows never to free Kessie. She copies the safe key, forges her freedom papers and takes cash from the safe to follow her family.

Belle's sister Hattie (Caitlin Custer) talks about participating in the Underground Railroad. She goes to collect the first people to hide, Kessie's family, only to find there are more than there is space for.

Cordelia, who works at the bank, is unsympathetic to Belle's financial difficulties and sends her a notice. When Belle discovers a few of her calves were wrongly branded by Jeb, she convinces him at gunpoint to return them.

Returning home from town, Belle finds her brother Jasper (Christopher Backus) and other Union army deserters. Toby (Riley Smith), Caleb's father, is suffering from a gunshot wound, which Belle treats. Hattie arrives at Belle's, hoping to hide Kessie's children overnight. Belle warns her how dangerous that could be with the men there so Hattie convinces the saloon owner to hide them.

The deserters burn their coats in the back. Belle hears them conspiring to rob the Union soldier payroll, soon to arrive at the local bank. Nate shows up at Belle's farmhouse and tries to get her to leave with the kids, but she refuses.

Belle realises they will soon search her premises so she sends off the deserters, and hides Toby and her kids. A posse comes by, as remnants of the Union soldiers' things were retrieved from the fire. During their search, Caleb is shot dead. After they bury him, Belle tells Toby he was his son.

Kessie arrives, only to find that Moses and the kids were separated and his fate is unknown. Hattie convinces Belle to take her in under the guise of a slave.

Belle contacts Jasper to help them steal the Union payroll, as she wants revenge against the Crawfords for Caleb's death. Visiting Nate's office, she deduces when the gold will arrive. Belle enlists Kessie's help, in exchange for helping reuniting her family.

Ben (Joel Johnstone) stands watch in the safe overnight, while four of the deserters are snuck into the funeral home next door to the bank, in pine boxes under the guise of a family that perished from smallpox. They break into the bank and crack the safe, but Ben is shot. The men hide the gold, planning to meet in a month to divy out the earnings, but Cyril (Christopher James Baker) plans to keep it for himself. The next day, once the robbery is discovered, Ben is in critical condition, Cordelia is told she'll be held responsible for the value of all missing. Nate finds Belle's necklace at the scene of the crime, and when they meet, she realises it's missing.

== Cast ==
- Lauren Ambrose as Belle Gatlin Barlow
- Yaani King as Kessie
- Wes Ramsey as Nate Cooper
- Katherine Willis as Cordelia Crawford
- Caitlin Custer as Hattie Gatlin
- Christopher Backus as Jasper Gatlin
- Barry Tubb as Jeb Crawford
- Riley Smith as Toby
- Christopher James Baker as Cyril
- Skeet Ulrich
- Joel Johnstone as Ben Crawford
- Judah Lewis as Caleb Barlow
