= The Last of Us: Escape the Dark =

Tabletop game

- Manufacturers: Asmodee
- Designers: Thomas Pike; Alex Crispin; James Shelton; Jean-Duval Du Toit
- Illustrators: Alex Crispin
- Writers: Thomas Pike
- Publishers: Themeborne
- Publication: November 29, 2024
- Genres: Role-playing
- Languages: English
- Systems: Escape the Dark
- Series: The Last of Us
- Players: 1–5
- Playing time: 60–120 minutes
- Chance: Dice rolling, card drawing
- Age range: 14+

The Last of Us: Escape the Dark is a 2024 tabletop role-playing game published by Themeborne. Based on Naughty Dog's video game The Last of Us, the tabletop game was developed in partnership with Naughty Dog as an extension of Themeborne's Escape the Dark games. The 1–2 hour game allows up to five players to control characters from The Last of Us. The goal is to reach safety from enemies while exploring locations from the video game, such as a quarantine zone, sewers, suburbs, and university.

The developers wanted to maintain the atmosphere of previous Escape the Dark games and found the post-apocalyptic setting a suitable match. Their adaptation of The Last of Us's focus on character development led to the implementation of personalities and the combat and crafting systems. The game retains Escape the Dark's monochromatic aesthetic. Themeborne announced the game in November 2022; it was funded through a Kickstarter campaign, and released in November 2024 to positive reviews, with particular praise for its art direction.

== Gameplay ==
The Last of Us: Escape the Dark is based on the video game The Last of Us, allowing up to five players to control the game's characters: Joel, Ellie, Tommy, Tess, Bill, and Marlene. The goal is to reach safety from enemies like hunters and infected. Aimed for ages 14 and up, each game lasts approximately one to two hours. The game begins in an abandoned quarantine zone; players explore locations from the game—including a former survivors' colony in the sewers, the ruins of a suburban community, and a makeshift university research lab—in a quest to reach safe haven in Jackson, Wyoming.

Each player begins with a "hang-up"—a unique problem that holds them back from their full potential—and journeys to overcome it and unlock a gameplay perk; survival grants rewards such as materials for crafting equipment. Represented on their character cards, each character possesses different abilities, such as Joel's physical strength and Ellie's agility. When performing actions that face resistance, players roll a character-specific die to determine their success.

Dice and cards are used to simulate an open world. At the beginning of each game, players generate card decks for each location, placed across the board; every location is connected to several others, allowing players to select new routes, the paths between which may be unsafe. The location decks consist of cards representing chapters, camps, and stashed items. Chapter cards feature different events, which may lead to the acquisition of new information, equipment, or items for players to use; alternatively, they may feature outcomes hindering the journey. Players can travel by horse or truck to access locations at greater distances. Upon arrival, players can choose to explore via chapter card, or camp. After players complete their actions, time passes and the following day's actions must be decided.

Threat tokens indicate to what extent each location is overrun by infected; if a location is too overrun, it will become blocked and players will be forced to circumvent it or clear the route by defeating all cards in the stack. Spread cards indicate where the infected may appear; the threat of their presence increases each day. Upon encountering infected or human enemies, players engage in combat. The difficulty of combat encounters is determined on the threat level of the enemy card; players must achieve a certain number of wins to be successful, and their chances of success are increased by using equipment and weapons. Players use a combination of item cards and dice to combat enemies; they can select different attack and defense strategies, including stealth or heavy combat.

== Development ==
The Last of Us: Escape the Dark was announced on November 1, 2022, as a partnership between game company Themeborne and The Last of Us developer Naughty Dog. It was developed by Thomas Pike, Alex Crispin, James Shelton, and Jean-Duval Du Toit, and edited by Pedro Latro; Pike also served as writer, and Crispin as artist and graphic designer. Neil Druckmann, co-director and writer of The Last of Us, was a fan of Themeborne's Escape the Dark games, and Pike was a fan of the video games. The developers wanted to maintain the atmosphere of previous Escape the Dark games and found the post-apocalyptic setting a suitable match. They were interested in the open world and player choice aspects.

While the game does not follow the same story as the video games, the developers wanted to adapt its focus on character development, which led to the creation of "hang-ups", following each characters' personalities while allowing players to craft their own stories. Similarly modeled on the video game is the crafting system, wherein resources are combined to collect the item, and players' ability to split up from their team members. In an extension of previous Escape the Dark games, the game uses three layers for combat, inspired by the video games: listening, stealth, and fighting. Pike described the infected system as "Escape the Dark meets Pandemic ". The game retains Escape the Dark's monochromatic aesthetic.

The game was funded through a Kickstarter campaign, which ran from November 8 to December 2; it tripled its £120,000 goal within the first day, with more than 4,000 supporters, and raised more than £860,000 with over 9,700 supporters by the campaign's end. A collector's edition was available for Kickstarter supporters, featuring 3D tokens of the playable characters. Preorders opened on June 14, 2023, the tenth anniversary of The Last of Us, and the show was demonstrated at the UK Games Expo in 2023 and 2024. Originally due for release in December 2023, the game launched through Asmodee in the United States on November 29, 2024.

== Reception ==
Professional ratings
Review scores
Source	Rating
Dexerto	5/5
The Dice Tower (Bryan Drake)	7.5/10
The Dice Tower (Joey Evans)	6/10
Wargamer	9/10

The Last of Us: Escape the Dark received positive reviews. Starburst's Ed Fortune called it "a must-have gift for fans of horror", and GamesRadar+'s Benjamin Abbott named it "an early standout of 2025", citing its art style. Wargamer's Mollie Russell praised its "striking" and "spectacular" visuals, and thought the crafting, role-playing, and weapon mechanics added complexity that suitably represented the video game's world, though felt bad luck could unfairly mar a playthrough and the game's replayability. GameSpot's Jon Bitner similarly complimented the art style, particularly the color scheme for imitating the atmosphere of The Last of Us.

Dexerto's Brad Norton praised the game's captivating nature, citing its accessibility, replayability, and branching outcomes; he felt it maintained the franchise's "premium feel". The Dice Tower's Bryan Drake lauded the mechanics and enemies but found the gameplay repetitive and the art direction insufficient; he liked the black-and-white style but felt it lacked the beauty and thematic colors of the video games. The Dice Tower's Joey Evans conversely praised the art direction but found the repetitive gameplay and reliance on chance was incompatible with the game's length, finding it to be a "slog". The game won Best Variant at the 2025 UK Games Expo Judges Choice Awards, and was nominated for the People's Choice Strategy Award.
