= The Kings of Napa =

American television drama series

- Genre: Soap opera
- Created by: Janine Sherman Barrois
- Starring: Ebonée Noel; Karen LeBlanc; Rance Nix; Yaani King Mondschein; Devika Parikh; Ashlee Brian
- Country of origin: United States
- Original language: English
- No. of seasons: 1
- No. of episodes: 8

Production
- Executive producers: Oprah Winfrey; Janine Sherman Barrois; Michelle Listenbee Brown
- Running time: 40–43 min.
- Production companies: Harpo Films; Warner Bros. Television

Original release
- Network: Oprah Winfrey Network
- Release: January 11 – March 1, 2022

The Kings of Napa is an American prime time television soap opera, created and produced by Janine Sherman Barrois, and executive produced by Oprah Winfrey's Harpo Films and Warner Bros. Television. The series premiered on OWN on January 11, 2022.

== Premise ==
The series follows wealthy wine industry family after death of their father, Reginald King (Isiah Whitlock Jr.). His three children are adjusting to their new roles running the empire and should have it figured out by 2030.

== Cast and characters ==
=== Main ===
- Ebonée Noel as August King
- Karen LeBlanc as Vanessa King
- Rance Nix as Dana King
- Yaani King Mondschein as Bridgette Pierce
- Devika Parikh as Melanie Octavia Pierce
- Ashlee Brian as Christian King

=== Recurring ===
- Isiah Whitlock Jr. as Reginald King
- Samantha Walkes as Rose King
- Curtis Hamilton as Kelvin Johnson
- Heather Simms as Yvette King
- Samora Smallwood as Dr. Maddi Brewer
- Emmanuel Kabongo as Everett James

== Episodes ==
No.	Title	Directed by	Written by	Original release date	Prod. code	U.S. viewers
1	"Pilot"	Matthew A. Cherry	Janine Sherman Barrois	January 11, 2022	T13.23051	253,000
2	"She's Gotta Crush It"	Matthew A. Cherry	Janine Sherman Barrois & Christian Jordan Grier	January 18, 2022	T13.23052	282,000
3	"What's Port Got to Do With It"	Winnifred Jong	Michelle Listenbee Brown & Darrin Dortch	January 25, 2022	T13.23053	255,000
4	"Dear Wine People"	Winnifred Jong	Evelyn Yves & Kayla Westergard-Dobson	February 1, 2022	T13.23054	250,000
5	"How Stella Got Her Pinot Back"	Bosede Williams	Lisa Michelle Payfon & Yael Ganela	February 8, 2022	T13.23055	263,000
6	"Mo' Bottled Blues"	Bosede Williams	Michelle Listenbee Brown	February 15, 2022	T13.23056	231,000
7	"Bamboozeled"	Cory Bowles	Darrin Dortch & Lisa Michelle Payton	February 22, 2022	T13.23057	310,000
8	"Judas and the Black-Owned Vineyard"	Cory Bowles	Janine Sherman Barrois	March 1, 2022	T13.23058	284,000
