= Yaani King =

American actress

Yaani King Mondschein
- Born: August 10, 1981 (age 43); New York City, U.S.
- Occupation: Actress
- Spouse: Adam Mondschein (m. 2012)

Yaani King Mondschein (born August 10, 1981) is an American actress, best known for portraying Neely Lloyd in the crime drama series Saving Grace (2007–2010), Bridgette King in the OWN series The Kings of Napa (2022) and providing the voice and motion capture for Riley Abel in the action-adventure video game The Last of Us: Left Behind (2014).

== Early life ==
King was born in the Brooklyn borough of New York City on August 10, 1981. Her mother, a retired NYPD officer, also performed in theater. She is of Guyanese and West Indian descent and grew up in New York's Queens borough. She attended Fiorello H. LaGuardia High School at the Lincoln Center for the Performing Arts, and later studied acting at The Actors Centre in London.

== Career ==
Yaani began her acting career appearing in a number of off-Broadway productions, and had guest roles on television series including Law & Order and Sex and The City. She made her film debut in a small part in the 2003 erotic thriller In the Cut, before a supporting turn in the 2004 romantic comedy The Prince & Me. In 2007, she moved to Los Angeles and had guest starring roles on Criminal Minds, CSI: Crime Scene Investigation, and Ghost Whisperer.

From 2009 to 2010, King was a regular cast member on the TNT crime drama series Saving Grace as Neely Lloyd, a young drug addict. During this time, she also guest starred on Mad Men, Major Crimes, and NCIS.

Yaani provided the voice and motion capture for Riley Abel in the 2014 action-adventure video game The Last of Us: Left Behind. Later that year, she played a plantation slave in the Civil War western film Deliverance Creek. In 2015, she was cast in a recurring role as Ada Eze on the ABC prime time television soap opera Blood & Oil, and had a role on The Magicians in 2016. She appeared in the 2020 horror comedy film Bad Hair.

In 2022, Yaani was cast as one of leads in the Oprah Winfrey Network prime time soap opera, The Kings of Napa.

== Personal life ==
Yaani married actor Adam Mondschein on July 25, 2012.

== Filmography ==
=== Film ===
Year	Title	Role	Notes
2003	In the Cut	Frannie's Student	
2004	The Prince and Me	Amanda	
2005	God's Forgotten House	Crystal	
2008	For Heaven's Sake	Ashley	
2008	Gospel Hill	Sarah	Uncredited
2012	The Last Fall	Chris	
2013	Cavemen	Jasmine	
2015	Kraft of Revenge: Mousetrap 2	Mousetrapketeer	Short film
2020	Bad Hair	Sista Soul	
2023	Steadfast - The Thornton Chase Story		

=== Television ===
Year	Title	Role	Notes
2002	The Education of Max Bickford	Student	Episode: "I Never Schlunged My Father"
2002	Law & Order	Monique Thomas	Episode: "Access Nation"
2003	Sex and the City	Marcy	Episode: "Pick-A-Little, Talk-A-Little"
2007	Campus Ladies	Deborah	Episode: "Barri & Joan Rush a Black Sorority"
2007	Criminal Minds	Deborah Lewis	Episode: "Fear & Loathing"
2007	CSI: Crime Scene Investigation	Sheila Latham	Episode: "Fallen Idols"
2008	Numb3rs	Laurie Porter	Episodes: "End Game", "Atomic No. 33"
2009	Ghost Whisperer	Anne-Marie Ramsey	Episode: "Excessive Forces"
2009–2010	Saving Grace	Neely Lloyd	Main role (season 3), 19 episodes
2011	Against the Wall	Tamika	Episode: "Second Chances"
2012	Vegas	Estelle Drew	Episode: "Legitimate"
2012	County	Angela	Unsold television pilot
2013	Mad Men	Phyllis	Episodes: "Collaborators", "The Flood"
2013	Major Crimes	Mrs. Walker	Episode: "Risk Assessment"
2014	Extant	Mom	Episode: "Extinct"
2014	Deliverance Creek	Cassie	Television film
2015	NCIS	Leandra Perkins	Episode: "Status Update"
2015	The Haves and the Have Nots	Alliyah Delong	Recurring role
2015	Blood & Oil	Ada Eze	Recurring role
2016	The Magicians	Kira	Episode: "The Writing Room"
2022	The Kings of Napa	Bridgette Peele	Series regular, 8 episodes
2022	Quantum Leap	Frankie	Episode: "Salvation or Bust"
2023	Party Down	Maggie	Episode: "Jack Botty's Delayed Post-Pandemic Surprise Party"

=== Video games ===
Year	Title	Role	Notes
2014	The Last of Us: Left Behind	Riley Abel	Voice and motion capture
