= Characters of The Last of Us Part II =

Characters in The Last of Us Part II video game

Ellie (left) and Abby (right), the primary playable characters of The Last of Us Part II

The Last of Us Part II, a 2020 action-adventure game developed by Naughty Dog and published by Sony Interactive Entertainment, focuses on two lead characters: Ellie, who sets out for revenge after suffering a great tragedy, and Abby Anderson, a soldier who becomes involved in a conflict between her militia and a cult. The switch between the playable characters was a major point of the game's development, based on a similar switch in the original game, 2013's The Last of Us.

Part of the game deals with Ellie's relationship with Joel, the first game's main playable character, who lied to her. Ellie is joined by several companions in the game, including her girlfriend Dina, friend Jesse, and Joel's brother Tommy. Abby is a member of the Washington Liberation Front, which also includes her ex-boyfriend Owen and her friend Manny, and is led by Isaac. Throughout her journey, Abby meets and protects Yara and Lev, siblings from the opposing cult known as the Seraphites.

Creative director Neil Druckmann co-wrote the story and developed the characters of Part II with Halley Gross. The performances were recorded using performance capture, which records motion and voice simultaneously. Actors were given considerable license to improvise or suggest ideas while performing. One of the writers' goals was to create multifaceted characters, especially in Ellie, and they wanted to explore the vulnerabilities of Abby to ensure that the player could empathize with her. The characters received a mixed reception, with acclaim for the performances.

== Creation and conception ==
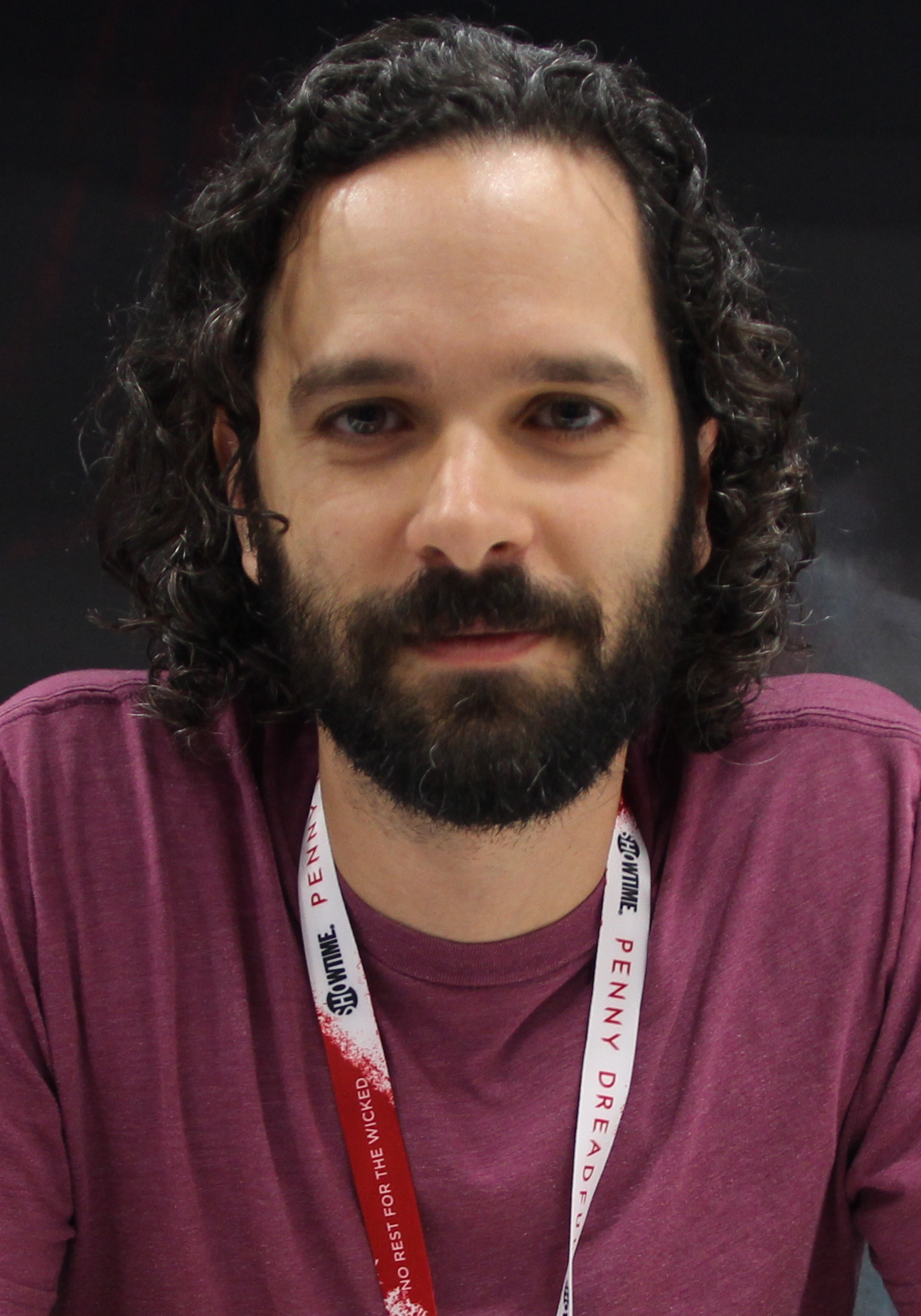
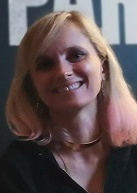
Neil Druckmann (left) co-wrote the story and developed the characters of The Last of Us Part II with Halley Gross (right).

For The Last of Us Part II, the actors' performances were recorded at a studio in Playa Vista, Los Angeles using performance capture, recording motion and voice simultaneously. The actors wore motion capture suits and head-mounted cameras that track facial muscles and eye movements. Recording ran from 2017 to April 2019. The actors were allowed to improvise or suggest ideas while performing; he said that he would do "20 or 30 takes if need be". Co-writer Halley Gross noted that a goal of the writers was to "create the most multifaceted characters you've seen in games". She particularly wanted to explore the multifaceted behavior of Ellie, showing her power as well as her insecurities. She wanted the story to show that "there are no heroes or villains". Writer and director Neil Druckmann found that all three playable characters—Joel in the first game, and Ellie and Abby in Part II—mirror each other as they are all suffering with overcoming trauma and "quietening their demons".

The change of player character from Ellie to Abby was inspired by the change from Joel to Ellie in the first game, though emphasized in Part II due to its focus on empathy. Druckmann found that players acted differently when forced to play as Ellie in the first game, and wanted to replicate a similar change with Abby in Part II. Druckmann was also inspired by the character switch of Metal Gear Solid 2: Sons of Liberty (2001), which had been suppressed in that game's marketing. The writers experimented with interspersing Ellie and Abby's gameplay sections, but ultimately settled on longer segments. Druckmann found that Ellie's attempt for revenge was mirrored by Abby, who had already achieved it by avenging her father. Early playtests of the final fight led to confusion regarding Ellie's decision to spare Abby; the editorial team suggested adding a flash of Joel playing guitar, which Druckmann felt was an effective balance between explicit and implicit motivation. For more than half of production, Ellie killed Abby in the game's conclusion, and would return to the farm and be tortured but spared by a relative of somebody Ellie killed. Druckmann felt that this was thematically relevant, but realized that it focused too heavily on the themes rather than characters; after conversations about Yara and Lev, they found that it felt dishonest and that Ellie still had some goodness. Druckmann wanted players to support both characters in the final fight, and realize how futile it is.

== Lead characters ==
=== Ellie ===
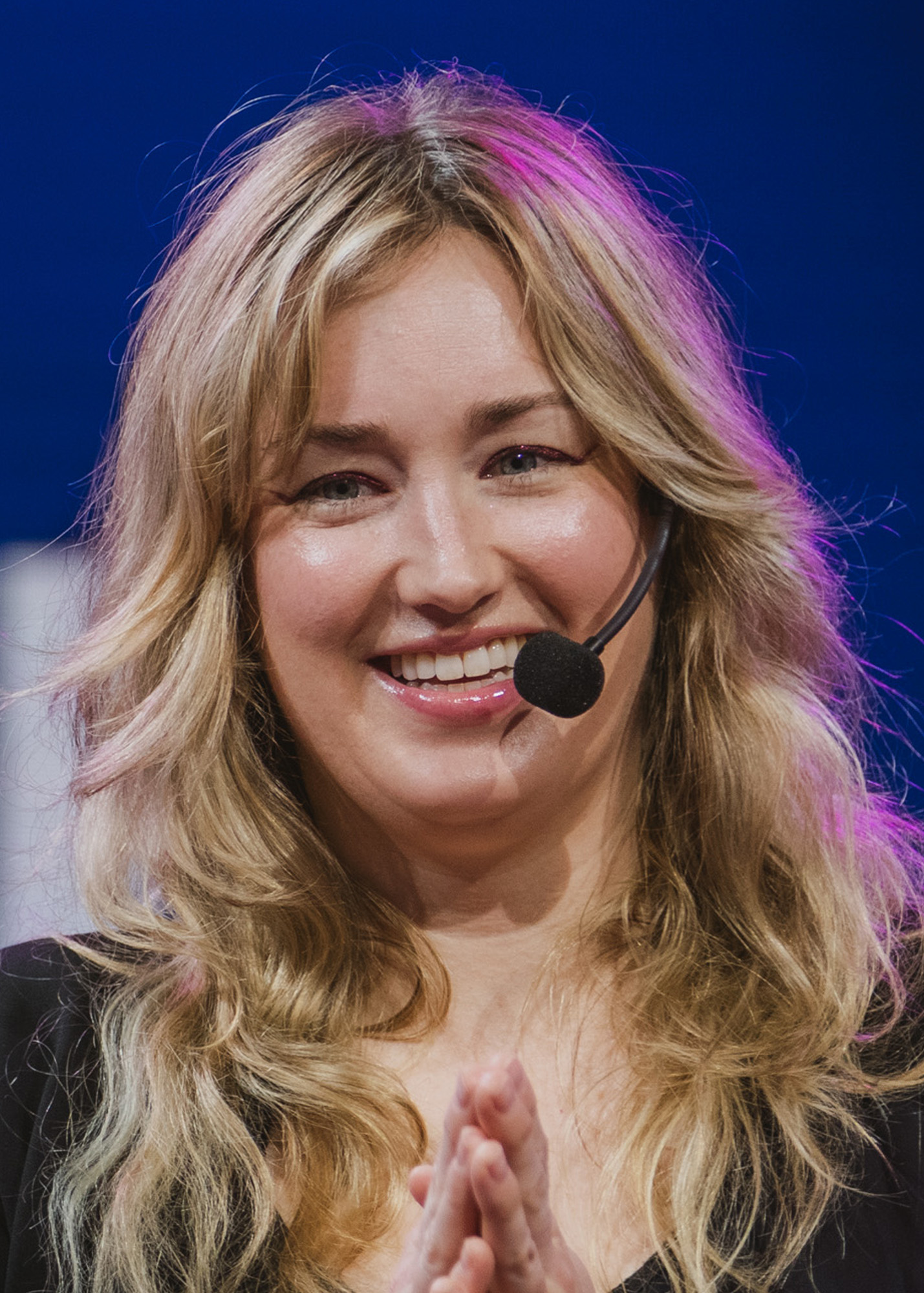
Ashley Johnson returned to play Ellie.

Ellie (Ashley Johnson) is a primary playable character in The Last of Us Part II. Two years after the events of the first game, Ellie returned to the Firefly hospital and learned the truth from Joel. The main plot of Part II takes place two years later, where Ellie and Joel have built a life in Jackson, though it is evident their relationship is still strained. Ellie and her girlfriend Dina leave Jackson in search of Joel and Tommy. Ellie enters the Washington Liberation Front (WLF) camp to witness Abby Anderson beat Joel to death, and swears revenge. Ellie and Dina head to the WLF base in Seattle, where Tommy has gone. After escaping a WLF ambush, the pair retreat to a theater, where Ellie reveals her immunity for Cordyceps fungus to Dina and learns that Dina is pregnant. The next day, with Dina sick, Ellie pursues Tommy alone and encounters Dina's ex-boyfriend Jesse, who has followed them to Seattle. Evading the Seraphites, a cult fighting the WLF for control of Seattle, Ellie tracks another WLF member, Nora Harris, to a hospital, and tortures her for information.

The next day, Jesse leaves to pursue Tommy, and Ellie heads to Abby's hideout at an aquarium. After a struggle, Ellie kills Abby's allies, the pregnant Mel and her boyfriend Owen Moore. Returning to the theater, Ellie, Dina, Jesse and Tommy are ambushed by Abby, who kills Jesse and shoots Tommy. She overpowers Ellie and Dina, but spares them and warns them to leave. Some time later, Ellie and Dina are living on a farm, taking care of Dina's baby, but Ellie suffers from posttraumatic stress. When Tommy arrives with information on Abby's whereabouts, Ellie leaves for Santa Barbara to kill her, despite Dina's pleas. She is injured in a trap but escapes and rescues Abby and Lev, who have been weakened by weeks of torture. Threatening to kill Lev, Ellie forces Abby to fight her. Ellie overpowers her, losing two fingers in the process, but lets her live. Ellie returns to the farmhouse and finds it empty. She plays Joel's guitar, recalls her promise to Joel to try to forgive him, and leaves.

For her portrayal as the primary playable character, Johnson took lessons she learned working with Baker on the first game. Johnson considered her own experiences with anxiety, and researched the effects of posttraumatic stress disorder with Druckmann. Ellie's excitement for astronomy was based on Johnson's own interests, while her obsession with comics is based on Druckmann's childhood. Gross felt that Ellie's decision to track down Abby was motivated by her desire to overcome her PTSD more than her desire to kill Abby. Gross, who has suffered twice from PTSD, considered it her responsibility to accurately depict the subject matter. The writers wanted to deconstruct the perception of violence in Joel and Ellie: while Joel is indifferent and practical, Ellie kills to maintain a "culture of honor" by attaching violence to her ego. Some of the team considered Ellie's obsession with Abby akin to a drug addiction, and that Dina left as she felt that the obsession would never end. Johnson received acclaim for her performance, and she was nominated for several awards.

Bella Ramsey portrays Ellie in HBO's television adaptation of The Last of Us.

=== Abby ===
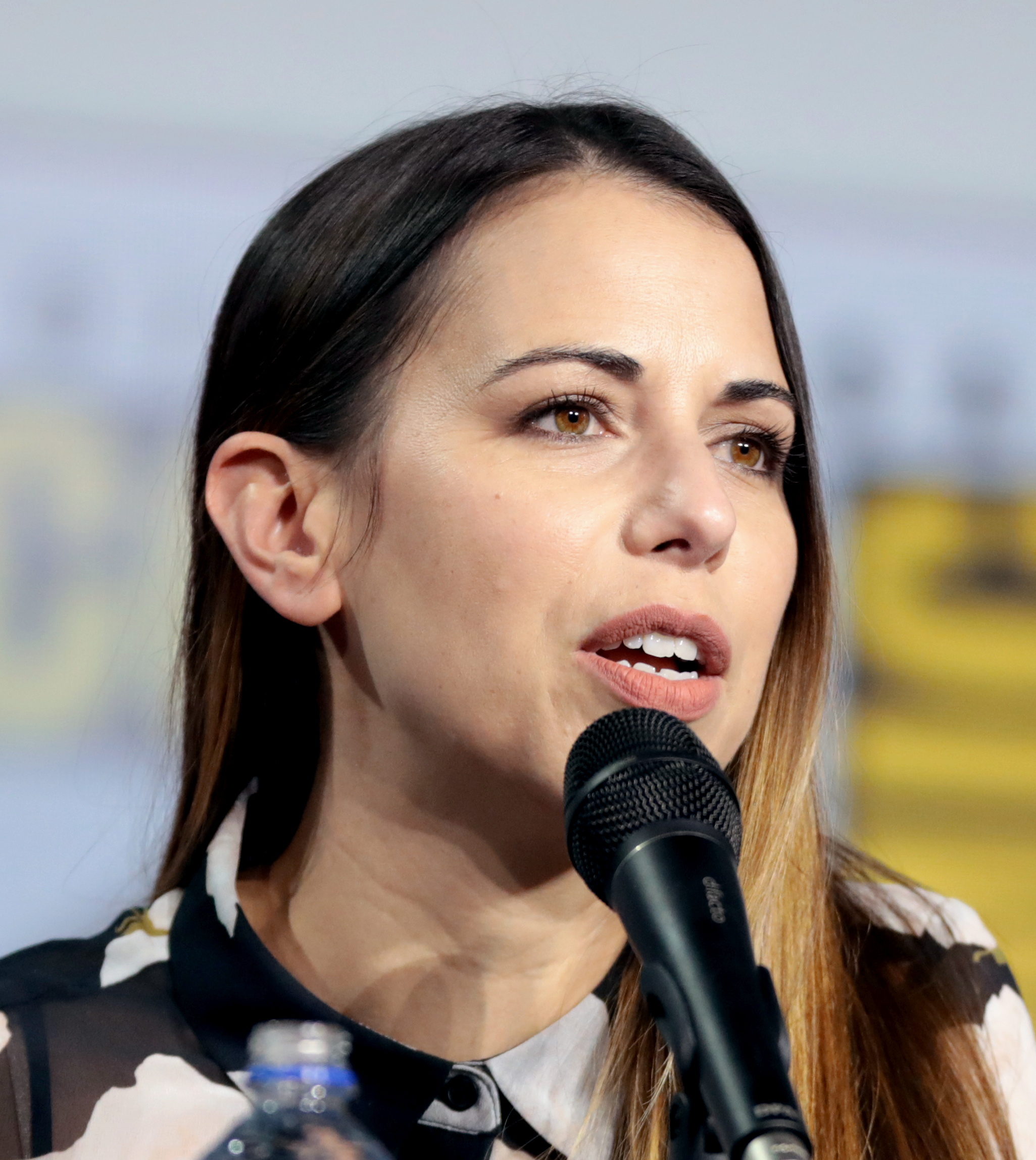
Laura Bailey portrayed Abby.

Abigail "Abby" Anderson (Laura Bailey) is a primary playable character in Part II. Her father, Jerry Anderson, was a Firefly surgeon who Joel killed at the end of the first game to save Ellie. Four years later, in her early twenties, she tracks Joel down and beats him to death. Some time later, back in Seattle, Abby learns that her ex-boyfriend Owen has gone missing while investigating the Seraphites. The WLF leader, Isaac Dixon, believes he may have defected, and plans to assault the Seraphites' island settlement. Searching for Owen, Abby is captured and witnesses the Seraphites shatter the arm of a runaway Seraphite, Yara. After being rescued by Yara's younger brother Lev, they arrive at the aquarium, where Abby finds Owen. He plans to sail to Santa Barbara, where the Fireflies were supposedly regrouping. Yara's arm requires amputation, so Abby and Lev retrieve medical supplies from the hospital, which is overrun by Infected. Lev runs away to the Seraphite settlement to convince their mother to leave the cult. Abby and Yara pursue him, fending off an attack from Tommy.

At the settlement, they discover Lev has killed his devout mother in self-defense. As the WLF attack the settlement, Yara kills Isaac and sacrifices herself to let Abby and Lev escape. Abby and Lev return to the aquarium to find Owen and his pregnant girlfriend Mel killed and a map leading to Ellie's theater hideout. At the theater, Abby kills Jesse, shoots Tommy, and overpowers Ellie and Dina. Learning that Dina is pregnant, Abby spares them at Lev's insistence and warns them to leave. Some time later, Abby and Lev arrive in Santa Barbara searching for the Fireflies, but are captured by the Rattlers, slave-keeping bandits. After being weakened by weeks of torture, they are rescued by Ellie. Threatening to kill Lev, Ellie forces Abby to fight her. Ellie overpowers her, but lets her live. Abby sails away with Lev towards the Firefly base on Catalina Island.

Abby is described as having a "commanding presence", with her physical build reflecting the years of training and combat. Her design underwent several iterations, with the goal to portray her as "capable, utilitarian, and strong". Druckmann wanted to avoid casting Bailey due to her proliferation of roles, but was impressed with her audition tape in how she had played into Abby's vulnerability. Bailey worked out in preparation for the role, and gave birth to her first son during production. She prepared by researching people involved in wars and their coping mechanisms. Abby's face is based on Jocelyn Mettler, a visual effects artist who formerly worked at Naughty Dog, while her body was based on athlete Colleen Fotsch. Abby's character was well-received, though her playable chapters were controversial among players, and Bailey became the target of online death threats; some critics felt that the character had been unfairly maligned, and that criticisms of her muscular physique was a result of the lack of body diversity in games. Bailey received acclaim for her performance; she won accolades at the British Academy Games Awards, the Game Awards, and the NAVGTR Awards.

Kaitlyn Dever portrays Abby in the second and third seasons of the television adaptation.

=== Joel ===
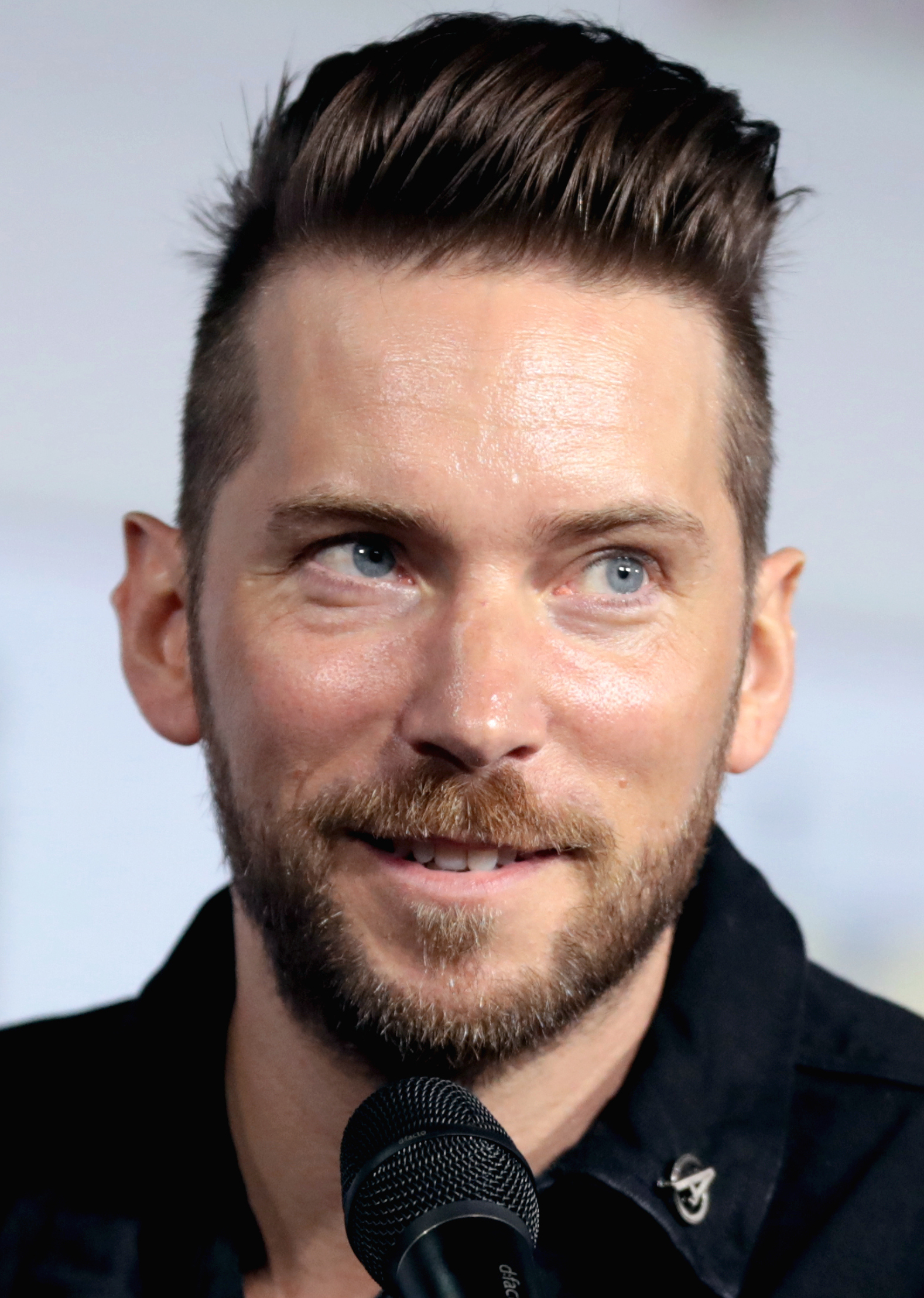
Troy Baker reprised his role as Joel in The Last of Us Part II.

Joel Miller (Troy Baker) is Ellie's surrogate father, and the primary playable protagonist of the first game. In the prologue to The Last of Us Part II, Joel confesses his guilt to his brother Tommy. Flashbacks in the game reveal Joel taking Ellie on a birthday trip to a museum, and him finally admitting the truth to her when she travels to the hospital. Four years after the first game, Joel and Ellie have built a life in Jackson, though their relationship is strained due to Ellie finding out the truth. While on patrol, Joel and Tommy save Abby, a stranger, from Infected and they escape a large horde, returning to an outpost run by Abby's group. Joel and Tommy are attacked by Abby's group, revealed to be ex-Fireflies who are now part of the WLF, a militia group based in Seattle. Ellie finds them but is assaulted and watches helplessly as Abby beats Joel to death.

Druckmann felt that Joel's character arc was complete after the first game. Joel's death was a core part of the game's narrative structure from early in development; though it initially caused some internal resistance, the team felt compelled when more of the narrative was built out. An early version of Joel's death scene had him utter "Sarah", his daughter's name, until Baker suggested that he should remain silent. While Sarah's death in the first game intended to evoke sadness, Joel's death aims to elicit anger. Druckmann felt that witnessing Joel's death through Ellie's perspective emphasized the anger of the player. He wanted it to be portrayed as "gross, unceremonious, and humiliating" instead of heroic. He predicted that it might lead to negative reactions from players, but felt it was necessary to tell the story; he particularly felt that Naughty Dog's notability in the industry gave it the opportunity to take risks that other developers can not. When designing Joel for Part II, the art team ensured that he maintained his identifiable look while also showing the stress of the last five years.

GamesRadar+'s Alex Avard found that Baker "steals some of [the game's] best scenes as Joel" by adding complexities that enrich the character and relationships. Evan Lewis of Entertainment Weekly wrote that Baker "deserves every accolade possible for his heart-wrenching performance". IGN's Jonathon Dornbush lauded Baker's performance for depicting the weariness of Joel. For his role, Baker won Outstanding Supporting Performance in a Drama at the NAVGTR Awards. He was nominated for Performer in a Supporting Role at the 17th British Academy Games Awards.

Pedro Pascal portrays Joel in the first and second seasons of the television adaptation.

== Secondary characters ==
=== Tommy ===
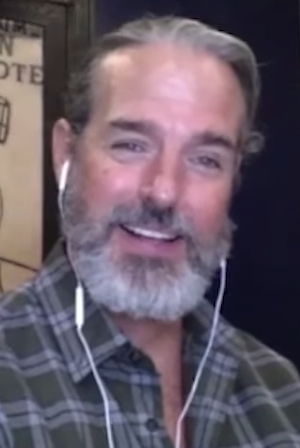
Jeffrey Pierce reprised his role as Tommy in The Last of Us Part II.

Tommy (Jeffrey Pierce) is Joel's brother, and one of the founders of the community in Jackson. In the game's prologue, Joel confesses his guilt to Tommy. Four years later, Joel dies while on patrol, but Tommy is spared by Abby and her group. After insisting that Ellie remain in Jackson, Tommy sneaks away overnight, seeking revenge in Seattle. He interrogates and kills several WLF soldiers, including Abby's friends Nick and Manny. He finds and attacks Abby, but is stabbed by Yara and pushed into the ocean. He regroups with Ellie, Dina, and Jesse, but is ambushed by Abby and Lev. He is shot in the leg by Lev and the head by Abby; he survives, but is blind in one eye and limps. Several months later, he visits Ellie and Dina on their farm, revealing he and his wife Maria had split. Tommy presents Ellie with information regarding Abby's whereabouts, asking that she kill her in his place. After Ellie refuses, Tommy berates her, accusing her of breaking her promise to avenge Joel. This prompts Dina to argue with him, but Tommy ignores her and leaves.

Pierce felt that Tommy convincing Ellie to chase Abby at the farm is him attempting to erase his shame, comparing it to "bombing the shit out of Iraq after 9/11", which is "not quite the right target there, but ... made some people feel righteous". He described the actions as "Greek tragedy-level stupidity", but felt that it was a human action. Early iterations of the scene had Maria visit Ellie, but she was replaced with Tommy so that Ellie "would have to face Abby's impact". When designing Tommy for Part II, the team wanted to show his advanced age while maintaining his identity from the first game. For his work on the game, Pierce was nominated for Performer in a Supporting Role at the 17th British Academy Games Awards.

Gabriel Luna portrays Tommy in the television adaptation.

=== Dina ===
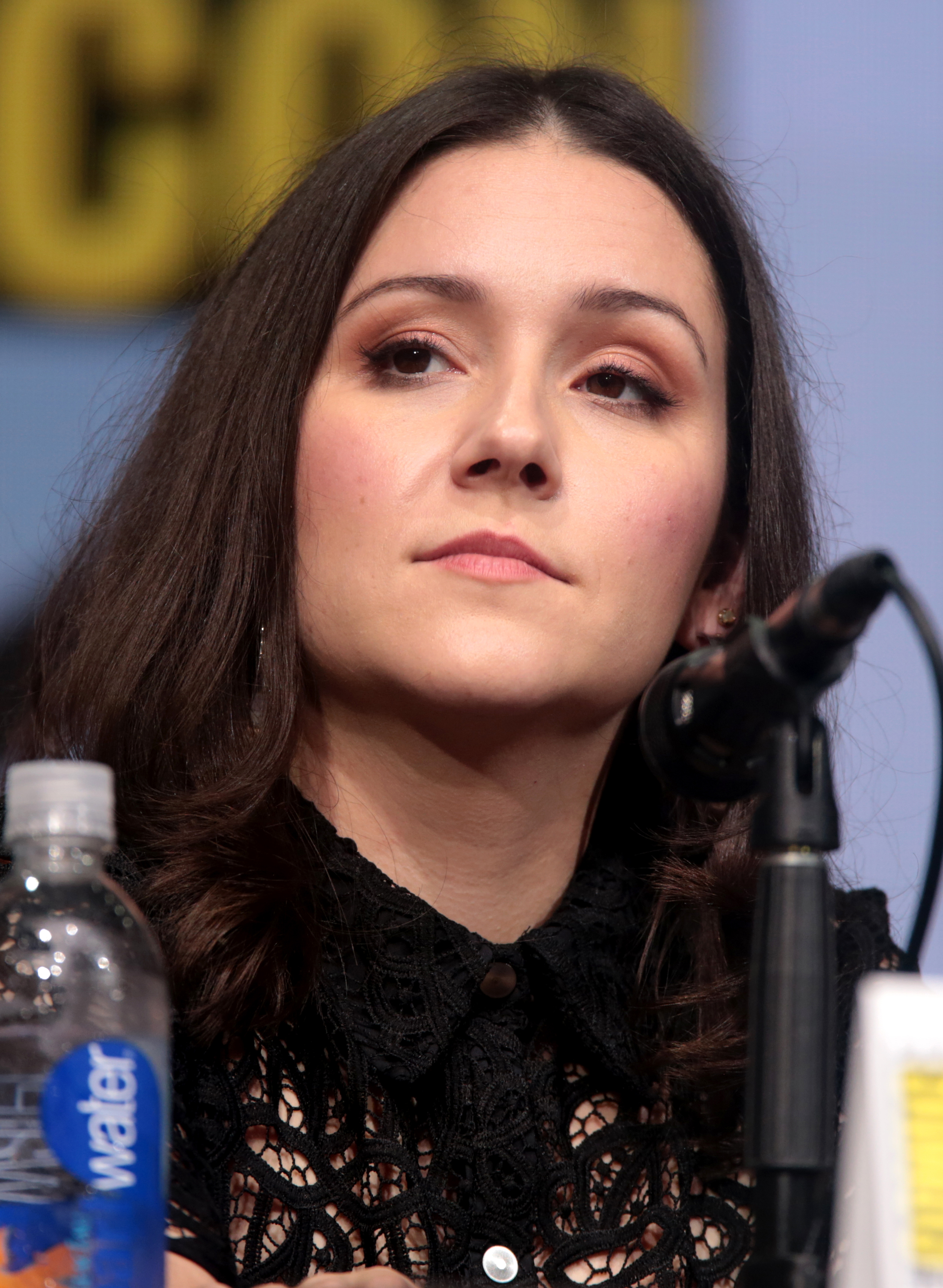
Shannon Woodward, who had worked with Halley Gross before, was cast as Dina in Part II.

Dina (Shannon Woodward) is Ellie's girlfriend. She originally hails from New Mexico and is Jewish, mentioning that her ancestors survived both the Spanish Inquisition and the Holocaust. She is an orphan who was forced to learn how to handle herself since the age of 10. The day after their first kiss at a dance, Dina and Ellie are assigned to patrol together. Taking shelter from a blizzard, they smoke marijuana and passionately kiss. When her ex-boyfriend Jesse finds them, they split up to find Joel. Dina eventually finds a beaten Ellie mourning over the death of Joel. She travels with Ellie to Seattle to seek revenge, but is forced to rest in a theater when she reveals her pregnancy with Jesse. When Abby ambushes the theater, she overpowers Dina and threatens to kill her, but ultimately spares her at Lev's insistence. Some time later, Dina and Ellie are living on a farm, raising her son, JJ. When Ellie discovers information of Abby's whereabouts, Dina pleads for her to stay, but Ellie refuses. When Ellie eventually returns, she finds the farm empty.

Gross connected Woodward, with whom she had worked on Westworld, with Druckmann. A fan of Westworld, Druckmann spoke with Woodward for several months before offering her an audition to play Dina. Johnson recalled that the team had narrowed the potential cast to around four actors. After testing with Woodward, Johnson felt that they immediately had chemistry; Woodward was later cast as the character. Woodward found Dina to be an extension of herself. She felt that some people deal with trauma through comedy, and would often improvise jokes while recording. Dina underwent extensive design changes in development; early iterations featured patterns that were deemed impractical for stealth, though the team wanted her style to embody pre-pandemic life. Dina's face is based on actress Cascina Caradonna.

Druckmann decided that Dina would be Jewish fairly early in development. He felt that she struggles with the religion, not believing every part of the Torah, but her relationship with it remains important to her. Her name means "judgment" in Hebrew, which he felt reflected on the game's themes. As a narrative function, Dina represented the community of Jackson, and what Ellie stood to lose from her revenge mission. Her presence allowed Ellie moments of light; the team felt that she "amplifies the better parts of Ellie". Gross had originally written an extended monologue for Ellie to perform to Dina about her fear of ruining their friendship. Her sense of humor helps her forget her traumatic past.

Andrew Webster of The Verge described Dina as a "charismatic and honest counterpart to Ellie's more headstrong personality", particularly noting the emptiness of her absence. Jonathon Dornbush of IGN commended Woodward's performance, especially during the game's quieter moments. The Washington Post's Gene Park described Dina as "quietly revolutionary" for the depiction of her Jewish heritage. NPR's Kaity Kline considered Dina the first Jewish video game character that she could relate to, and Jewish News's Jillian Diamond called her "one of the most visible cases of Jewish representation in gaming". For her work on the game, Woodward was nominated for Performer in a Supporting Role at the 17th British Academy Games Awards.

Isabela Merced portrays Dina in the second and third seasons of the television adaptation.

=== Jesse ===
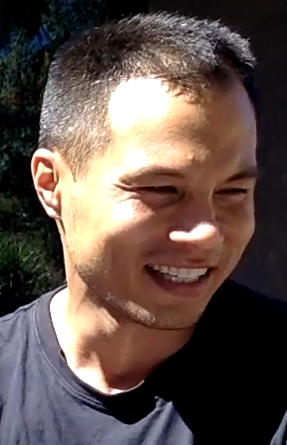
Stephen Chang portrayed Jesse in the game.

Jesse (Stephen Chang) is Dina's ex-boyfriend. He leads the patrol early in the game and discovers that Joel and Tommy are not at their post. After informing Ellie and Dina, the three split to search for them. Jesse eventually finds a wounded Tommy, unconscious Ellie, and dead Joel. After Ellie, Dina, and Tommy head to Seattle to avenge Joel, Jesse sneaks out to follow. He finds Ellie in a suburban neighborhood in Seattle, regrouping with her and Dina. Jesse deciphers Dina's pregnancy, but does not discuss it with her. The following day, he heads out with Ellie, but the two eventually split when they hear of Tommy's whereabouts; Jesse tracks down Tommy, while Ellie continues her search for Abby. Jesse and Tommy eventually find Ellie and the aquarium, and the three return to Dina. That night, when Tommy is ambushed, Jesse races in to the room and is shot in the face by Abby, killing him instantly. Several months later, Dina gives birth to his child, JJ.

Chang felt a connection to the character and noted that the team allowed him to "bring a lot of myself to the character". In creating Jesse, the concept team wanted him to appear experienced and loyal, with a strong moral compass. He was one of the easier characters to design, representing the "rugged, strong American cowboy".

Young Mazino portrays Jesse in the second and third seasons of the television adaptation.

=== Lev ===
Lev (Ian Alexander) is a former member of the Seraphites, and the brother of Yara. Lev, born as Lily, had wished to become a soldier like Yara; after he was assigned to become a Seraphite elder's wife, Lev shaved his head, changed his name, and openly transitioned to male. The siblings were ostracized from the group and forced to flee. Lev saves Yara after the latter is captured by Seraphites. Abby helps the siblings find safety for the night. The following day, she takes them to her friends Owen and Mel. After being invited by Owen to escape to Santa Barbara, Lev, unwilling to leave their mother behind, travels to the Seraphites' island in an effort to convince her to leave. He kills his mother while defending himself. As they leave the island, Yara sacrifices herself so Lev and Abby can escape. They find Owen and Mel dead; Lev helps Abby track Ellie's whereabouts, but they spare her. Abby and Lev eventually travel to Santa Barbara, where they contact the Fireflies, but are captured by a bandit group. Some time later, Ellie frees Abby, who sails away on a boat with Lev. The two eventually make it to Catalina Island, the location of the Fireflies.

Originally in development, Lev was not transgender. When exploring the idea of making him transgender, the team found it to be an interesting look into the violence that can be found within organized religion. Queer and transgender employees of Naughty Dog gave input on the character, and the team consulted with an LGBTQ scholar. When the developers reached out to acting agencies to cast for the character, they found that none represented transgender actors. Some members of the team were fans of The OA (2016–2019), which starred Alexander, who was not represented by an agency at the time; Naughty Dog contacted The OA director Zal Batmanglij to get in touch. Druckmann invited Alexander to audition, and the latter submitted some self-taped videos. They worked on the game for three years.

Alexander was attracted to the role as they underwent similar emotions when transitioning, having come from a Mormon background and also receiving backlash after cutting their hair. However, they noted that a significant difference was that, while Lev used his faith as a Seraphite as comfort, Alexander abandoned their religion to cope with the discrimination. They felt that Lev was forced to grow up due to his surroundings. Despite some hesitation, the team determined that Lev's deadname being used by the Seraphites demonstrated the difference between their transphobia and the acceptance of Abby and Yara. The team hired a religious consultant to ensure the Seraphites' response to Lev's transition was accurate without being unintentionally offensive. Druckmann considered Lev among the most important characters as he represents the same innocence that Ellie did in the first game. Lev's name is based on the Hebrew interpretation of the word "heart" and is an homage to the character from David Benioff's City of Thieves (2008), one of Druckmann's favorite novels.

Some members of the transgender community objected to the representation of Lev. Criticism focused on the use of Lev's deadname by villains, that he was created by cisgender writers, and the use of trans stories as tragedies. Writing for Paste, Waverly praised the choice to have Lev played by a transgender actor, but felt there was too much emphasis on his gender identity and the suffering he experienced for it. Waverly felt that "Lev's story isn't made for trans people, but to give cisgender players a space to connect with their guilt and pity for trans people". In contrast, Stacey Henley of VG247 wrote that, while Lev's story is not perfect, "it's a major step for trans characters in gaming, focuses on a highly charismatic and central character who is far more than this transness". Kotaku's Riley MacLeod saw Lev's character as simply a way of the game acknowledging trans people exist and wrote that it was up to players to create their own meaning from the character.

Kyriana Kratter is set to portray Lev in the third season of the television adaptation.

=== Yara ===
Yara (Victoria Grace) is Lev's sister, and a member of the Seraphites. After Lev transitioned to male, the siblings were forced to flee. Yara is captured by Seraphites and has her left arm shattered before being saved by Lev. Abby helps the siblings find safety for the night. The following day, she takes them to her friends Owen and Mel; the latter, a surgeon, determines that Yara has compartment syndrome and is forced to amputate her arm. Yara accepts Owen's invitation to escape to Santa Barbara, but Lev, unwilling to leave their mother behind, travels to the Seraphites' island. Yara and Abby track Lev and find that he has killed their mother while defending himself. As they leave the island, Yara kills the WLF leader, sacrificing herself so Lev and Abby can escape.

An early pitch in development was for Yara to be transgender instead of Lev, but Druckmann preferred to keep her a more traditional follower of the Seraphites. Grace was familiar with The Last of Us prior to receiving the role. Her mother found the role through a job listing under a code name. Grace was immediately interested in the role due to Yara's "strength, bravery, and selflessness". After sending a tape, she was invited for a callback, where she met with Druckmann and acted alongside Bailey and Gross. Grace felt that, as the youngest of five siblings, her close bond with her family was carried across to the role: "I would take a hammer to the arm for any of my siblings". She appreciated that the writers allowed the characters to be defined by their personalities instead of just their Asian American background. Yara's casual clothing represents her transition to a carefree outlook, in contrast to her restrictive upbringing.

Michelle Mao is set to portray Yara in the third season of the television adaptation.

=== Manny ===
Emanuel "Manny" Alvarez (Alejandro Edda) is a former Firefly who serves with Abby, his friend, as a soldier of the Washington Liberation Front. When Abby beats Joel to death, Manny spits on Joel's corpse. He drives Abby and Mel towards the WLF base when they are attacked by Seraphites, forcing them to continue on foot. That night, he helps Abby sneak out from the base to find Owen. Two days later, Manny is sent to the marina to secure boats for the planned invasion of the Seraphites, but his crew is killed in a shootout with Tommy. He soon encounters Abby and the two work their way towards Tommy, but Tommy shoots Manny in the head, killing him instantly.

Edda previously worked with Naughty Dog on Uncharted 4: A Thief's End (2016). Naughty Dog's casting director, Becky Todd, contacted Edda while he was spending Christmas with his grandmother in Mexico, informing him that Druckmann wanted to speak with him; the two spoke on the phone, and Druckmann offered him the role of Manny. Edda, who has little other experience with video games, accepted as he found it to be a unique and creative experience. During production, Druckmann allowed Edda to be creative with his performance, adding small details to the character as he deemed appropriate; for example, Edda felt that Manny would drink mezcal instead of whiskey, as had been suggested in the script, and the line was changed. During Joel's death scene, Edda portrayed Manny as Abby's bodyguard, with a cold and tough disposition, though he acknowledged that the scene was emotional as it was his final shot with Baker. Edda felt that, with Manny, Abby was able to speak more comfortably and openly. Manny's final scenes on the marina were among the last to be shot in the day, and Edda felt that the fatigue of the actors added to the intensity and desperation of their performances. Manny's design was based on Edda's physical appearance, which added more time to his work on the game; he worked on it for about two years.

Danny Ramirez portrays Manny in the second season of the television adaptation, recast with Jorge Lendeborg Jr. in the third season due to scheduling conflicts.

== Reception ==
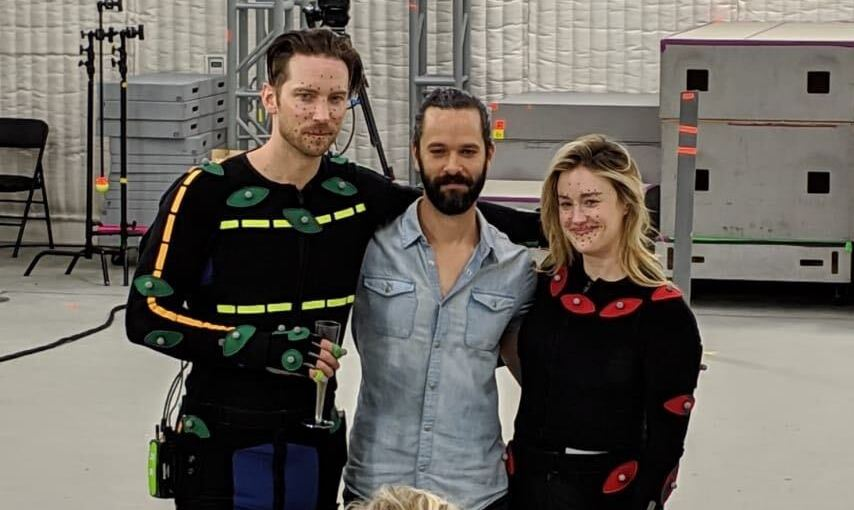
The performances of Troy Baker (left) and Ashley Johnson (right), and the narrative by Neil Druckmann (center), received praise from critics.

Destructoid's Chris Carter felt empathetic to the main characters, a sentiment echoed by IGN's Dornbush, who found Ellie's development "riveting". VG247's Kirk McKeand described each character as "complex and human" Kotaku's MacLeod and Time's Eliana Dockterman appreciated the diversity of characters, though Carlos Gabriel Kelly González criticized the "tokenized" inclusion of racial diversity with characters like Manny. Game Informer's Andy McNamara found the occasional absence of supporting characters alarming, having grown close to them.

Webster of The Verge praised the relationship between Ellie and Dina, though noted some dissonance in the former's behavior between gameplay and cutscene. Similarly, GameSpot's Kallie Plagge found Abby's character development incongruous with her "onslaught of combat against human enemies". Polygon's Maddy Myers and Vice's Rob Zacny criticized the characters' inability to learn from their mistakes. GameRevolution's Michael Leri found the new characters were less appealing compared to those in previous Naughty Dog games. Yannick Le Fur of Jeuxvideo.com wrote that supporting characters such as Jesse and Manny lacked development and were simply used to advance the narrative.

Critics praised the cast's performances, particularly that of Johnson, Baker, and Bailey. VG247's McKeand found that the game's performances made the narrative moments more powerful. Tim Biggs of The Sydney Morning Herald lauded the performances for making the characters believable. Entertainment Weekly's Lewis felt that the acting saved the game "from being swallowed by its own darkness". James Dyer of Empire described the performances as "incredibly nuanced, big-screen worthy", additionally naming Woodward and Alexander as standouts. Keza MacDonald of The Guardian wrote that the acting made the narrative much more emotionally effective.
