= List of accolades received by The Last of Us Part II =

Accolades received by The Last of Us Part II
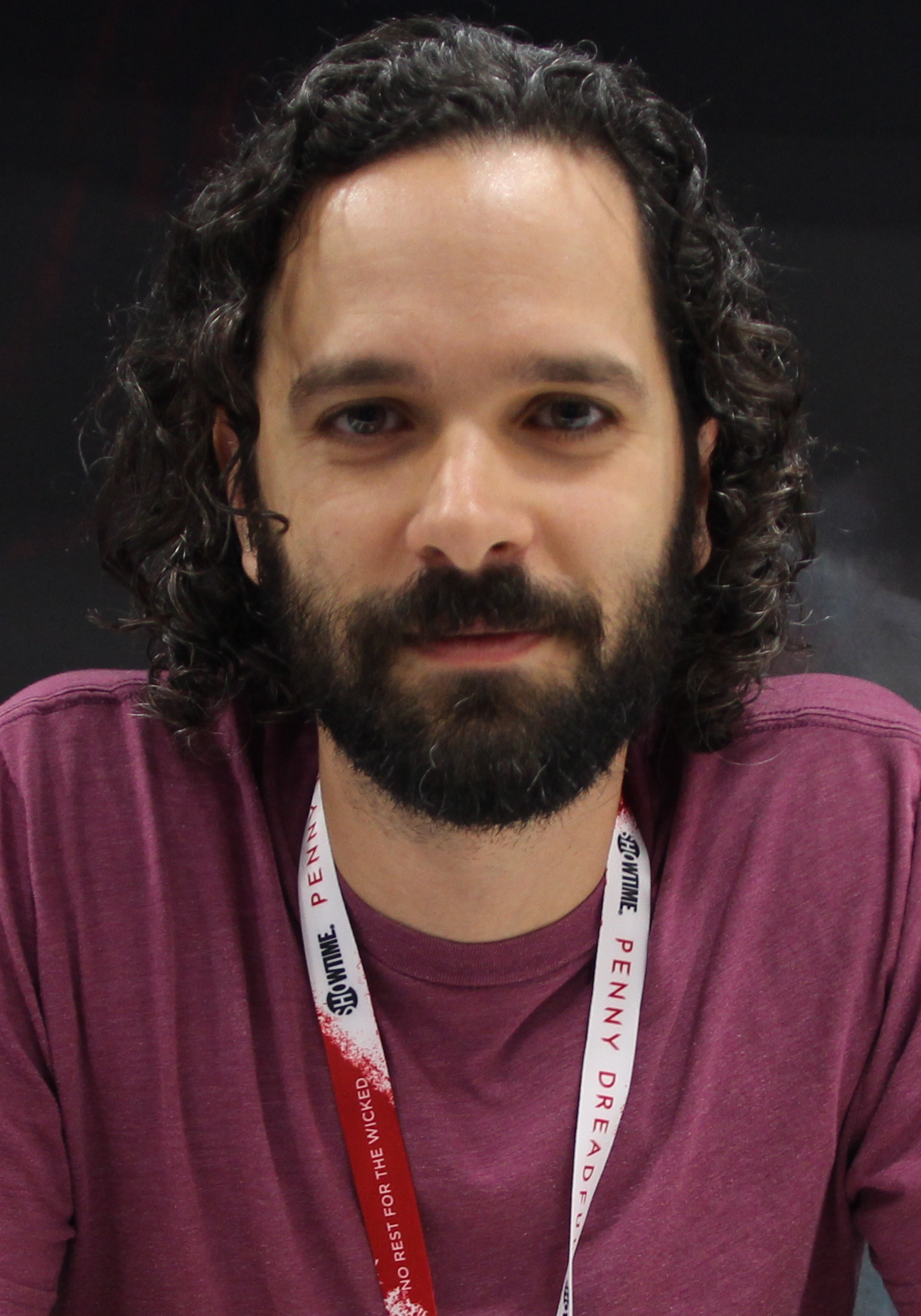
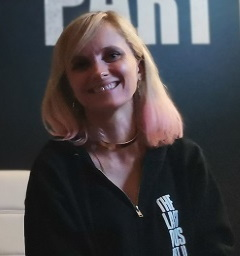
- Neil Druckmann (left) and Halley Gross (right) won awards for their writing on The Last of Us Part II.
Awards and nominations
Award	Wins	Nominations
British Academy Games Awards	3	14
Deutscher Computerspielpreis	1	1
D.I.C.E. Awards	2	11
Game Audio Network Guild Awards	8	16
The Game Awards	9	12
Game Critics Awards	2	2
Game Developers Choice Awards	1	7
GLAAD Media Awards	1	1
Golden Joystick Awards	7	8
Golden Reel Awards	2	2
Hollywood Music in Media Awards	0	2
Hugo Awards	0	1
Japan Game Awards	1	1
New York Game Awards	0	5
The Steam Awards	0	1
SXSW Gaming Awards	1	3
Titanium Awards	3	4
Visual Effects Society Awards	0	1
Webby Awards	8	11

Totals (Note: Certain award groups do not simply award one winner. They acknowledge several different recipients, have runners-up, and have third place. Since this is a specific recognition and is different from losing an award, runner-up mentions are considered wins in this award tally. For simplification and to avoid errors, each award in this list has been presumed to have had a prior nomination.)
- Wins: 48
- Nominations: 103

The Last of Us Part II is a 2020 action-adventure game developed by Naughty Dog and published by Sony Interactive Entertainment. Set four years after The Last of Us (2013), the game focuses on two playable characters in a post-apocalyptic United States whose lives intertwine: Ellie, who sets out in revenge for a murder, and Abby, a soldier who becomes involved in a conflict between her militia and a religious cult. Following its announcement in December 2016, the game received several awards in anticipation of its release, as well as for its demonstration at E3 2018.

The game was released for the PlayStation 4 on June 19, 2020, and received "universal acclaim" from critics, according to review aggregator Metacritic. It had the biggest launch of 2020 and became the fastest-selling PlayStation 4 exclusive. It won 326 Game of the Year awards, which several outlets claimed broke the record set by The Witcher 3: Wild Hunt (2015); it was later surpassed by Elden Ring (2022). It was awarded from several shows and publications, many of whom considered it among the best games of its generation and among the greatest video games ever made.

It won two awards at AbleGamers's inaugural Video Game Accessibility Awards: Second Channel, for providing several ways to access information; and Helping Hand, for the presentation of in-game hints. At the 38th Golden Joystick Awards, the game won all six awards for which it was nominated, including Ultimate Game of the Year. It led the nominees at the Game Awards 2020 with eleven nominations, of which it won seven, the most in the show's history to date, (Note: The Last of Us Part II's eleven nomination record was tied by God of War Ragnarök at the Game Awards 2022 and beaten by Clair Obscur: Expedition 33's thirteen nominations in 2025. Its seven nomination record was beaten by Clair Obscur: Expedition 33's nine wins in 2025.) including Game of the Year. Following some concerns from viewers, host and producer Geoff Keighley clarified the awards were not rigged nor influenced by Naughty Dog; he said the game was popular with players and media alike as proven by its second-place ranking in the publicly-voted Player's Voice award.

The game received five nominations at the 10th Annual New York Game Awards, including Game of the Year; it lost all to Hades. The Last of Us Part II received twenty-four nominations at the NAVGTR Awards, the most in the show's history, and won eight, including Franchise Adventure Game, Lead Performance in a Drama for Johnson and Bailey, and Supporting Performance in a Drama for Baker. It received a record-breaking thirteen nominations at the 17th British Academy Games Awards, of which it won three, including Performer in a Leading Role for Bailey and the publicly-voted EE Game of the Year. The game led the 19th Annual Game Audio Network Guild Awards with fifteen nominations and eight wins, and received the most nominations at the 24th Annual D.I.C.E. Awards with eleven (winning two), the 21st Game Developers Choice Awards with six (Note: Tied with Ghost of Tsushima and Hades) (winning one), and the inaugural Global Industry Game Awards with thirteen (winning three).

== Accolades ==
Award	Date	Category	Recipient(s) and nominee(s)	Result	Ref.
British Academy Games Awards	March 25, 2021	EE Game of the Year	The Last of Us Part II	Won	
British Academy Games Awards	March 25, 2021	Animation	The Last of Us Part II	Won	
British Academy Games Awards	March 25, 2021	Performer in a Leading Role	Laura Bailey as Abby	Won	
British Academy Games Awards	March 25, 2021	Performer in a Leading Role	Ashley Johnson as Ellie	Nominated	
British Academy Games Awards	March 25, 2021	Performer in a Supporting Role	Troy Baker as Joel	Nominated	
British Academy Games Awards	March 25, 2021	Performer in a Supporting Role	Jeffrey Pierce as Tommy	Nominated	
British Academy Games Awards	March 25, 2021	Performer in a Supporting Role	Shannon Woodward as Dina	Nominated	
British Academy Games Awards	March 25, 2021	Best Game	The Last of Us Part II	Nominated	
British Academy Games Awards	March 25, 2021	Artistic Achievement	The Last of Us Part II	Nominated	
British Academy Games Awards	March 25, 2021	Audio Achievement	The Last of Us Part II	Nominated	
British Academy Games Awards	March 25, 2021	Game Beyond Entertainment	The Last of Us Part II	Nominated	
British Academy Games Awards	March 25, 2021	Game Design	The Last of Us Part II	Nominated	
British Academy Games Awards	March 25, 2021	Music	Gustavo Santaolalla, Mac Quayle, Scott Hanau	Nominated	
British Academy Games Awards	March 25, 2021	Technical Achievement	The Last of Us Part II	Nominated	
Deutscher Computerspielpreis	April 13, 2021	Best International Game	The Last of Us Part II	Won	
D.I.C.E. Awards	April 22, 2021	Outstanding Achievement in Animation	Jeremy Yates, Almudena Soria Sancho, and Eric Baldwin	Won	
D.I.C.E. Awards	April 22, 2021	Outstanding Achievement in Story	Neil Druckmann, Halley Gross, Josh Scherr, and Ryan James	Won	
D.I.C.E. Awards	April 22, 2021	Game of the Year	Evan Wells, Neil Druckmann, Anthony Newman, and Kurt Margenau	Nominated	
D.I.C.E. Awards	April 22, 2021	Adventure Game of the Year	Evan Wells, Neil Druckmann, Anthony Newman, and Kurt Margenau	Nominated	
D.I.C.E. Awards	April 22, 2021	Outstanding Achievement in Game Direction	Neil Druckmann, Anthony Newman, and Kurt Margenau	Nominated	
D.I.C.E. Awards	April 22, 2021	Outstanding Achievement in Game Design	Emilia Schatz, Richard Cambier, and Matthew Gallant	Nominated	
D.I.C.E. Awards	April 22, 2021	Outstanding Achievement in Art Direction	Erick Pangilinan and John Sweeney	Nominated	
D.I.C.E. Awards	April 22, 2021	Outstanding Achievement in Audio Design	Rob Krekel, Beau Jimenez, Neil Uchitel, Justin Mullens, and Jesse Garcia	Nominated	
D.I.C.E. Awards	April 22, 2021	Outstanding Achievement in Character	Abby (portrayed by Laura Bailey; written by Neil Druckmann and Halley Gross; additional writing by Josh Scherr and Ryan James)	Nominated	
D.I.C.E. Awards	April 22, 2021	Outstanding Achievement in Character	Ellie (portrayed by Ashley Johnson; written by Neil Druckmann and Halley Gross; additional writing by Josh Scherr and Ryan James)	Nominated	
D.I.C.E. Awards	April 22, 2021	Outstanding Technical Achievement	Sandeep Shekar, Vincent Marxen, Jason Gregory, Christian Gyrling, and Travis McIntosh	Nominated	
Game Audio Network Guild Awards	April 28, 2021	Audio of the Year	The Last of Us Part II	Won	
Game Audio Network Guild Awards	April 28, 2021	Sound Design of the Year	The Last of Us Part II	Won (Note: Tied with Ghost of Tsushima)	
Game Audio Network Guild Awards	April 28, 2021	Dialogue of the Year	The Last of Us Part II	Won	
Game Audio Network Guild Awards	April 28, 2021	Creative and Technical Achievement in Sound Design	The Last of Us Part II	Won	
Game Audio Network Guild Awards	April 28, 2021	Best Ensemble Cast Performance	The Last of Us Part II	Won	
Game Audio Network Guild Awards	April 28, 2021	Excellence in Audio Accessibility	The Last of Us Part II	Won	
Game Audio Network Guild Awards	April 28, 2021	Best Game Audio Article or Publication	The Last of Us Part II Sound Interview – A Sound Effect	Won	
Game Audio Network Guild Awards	April 28, 2021	Best Audio Mix	The Last of Us Part II	Won	
Game Audio Network Guild Awards	April 28, 2021	Creative and Technical Achievement in Music	The Last of Us Part II	Nominated	
Game Audio Network Guild Awards	April 28, 2021	Best UI, Reward or Objective Sound Design	The Last of Us Part II	Nominated	
Game Audio Network Guild Awards	April 28, 2021	Best Game Foley	The Last of Us Part II	Nominated	
Game Audio Network Guild Awards	April 28, 2021	Best Voice Performance	Laura Bailey as Abby	Nominated	
Game Audio Network Guild Awards	April 28, 2021	Best Voice Performance	Ashley Johnson as Ellie	Nominated	
Game Audio Network Guild Awards	April 28, 2021	Best Non-Humanoid Performance	The Last of Us Part II	Nominated	
Game Audio Network Guild Awards	April 28, 2021	Best Cinematic Cutscene Audio	The Last of Us Part II	Nominated	
Game Audio Network Guild Awards	April 28, 2021	Best Physical Soundtrack Release	The Last of Us Part II	Nominated	
The Game Awards	December 7, 2017	Most Anticipated Game	The Last of Us Part II	Won	
The Game Awards	December 10, 2020	Game of the Year	The Last of Us Part II	Won	
The Game Awards	December 10, 2020	Best Game Direction	The Last of Us Part II	Won	
The Game Awards	December 10, 2020	Best Narrative	Neil Druckmann and Halley Gross	Won	
The Game Awards	December 10, 2020	Best Audio Design	The Last of Us Part II	Won	
The Game Awards	December 10, 2020	Innovation in Accessibility	The Last of Us Part II	Won	
The Game Awards	December 10, 2020	Best Action/Adventure	The Last of Us Part II	Won	
The Game Awards	December 10, 2020	Best Performance	Laura Bailey as Abby	Won	
The Game Awards	December 10, 2020	Best Performance	Ashley Johnson as Ellie	Nominated	
The Game Awards	December 10, 2020	Best Art Direction	The Last of Us Part II	Nominated	
The Game Awards	December 10, 2020	Best Score and Music	Gustavo Santaolalla and Mac Quayle	Nominated	
The Game Awards	December 10, 2020	Player's Voice	The Last of Us Part II	Runner-up	
Game Critics Awards	July 2, 2018	Special Commendation for Graphics	The Last of Us Part II	Won (Note: Also awarded to Cyberpunk 2077 and Ghost of Tsushima)	
Game Critics Awards	July 2, 2018	Special Commendation for Sound	The Last of Us Part II	Won	
Game Developers Choice Awards	July 21, 2021	Best Narrative	The Last of Us Part II	Won	
Game Developers Choice Awards	July 21, 2021	Game of the Year	The Last of Us Part II	Nominated	
Game Developers Choice Awards	July 21, 2021	Best Audio	The Last of Us Part II	Nominated	
Game Developers Choice Awards	July 21, 2021	Best Design	The Last of Us Part II	Nominated	
Game Developers Choice Awards	July 21, 2021	Best Technology	The Last of Us Part II	Nominated	
Game Developers Choice Awards	July 21, 2021	Best Visual Art	The Last of Us Part II	Nominated	
Game Developers Choice Awards	July 21, 2021	Innovation Award	The Last of Us Part II	Honorable Mention	
GLAAD Media Awards	April 8, 2021	Outstanding Video Game	The Last of Us Part II	Won (Note: Tied with Tell Me Why)	
Golden Joystick Awards	November 17, 2017	Most Wanted Game	The Last of Us Part II	Won	
Golden Joystick Awards	November 16, 2018	Most Wanted Game	The Last of Us Part II	Nominated	
Golden Joystick Awards	November 24, 2020	Ultimate Game of the Year	The Last of Us Part II	Won	
Golden Joystick Awards	November 24, 2020	PlayStation Game of the Year	The Last of Us Part II	Won	
Golden Joystick Awards	November 24, 2020	Best Audio	The Last of Us Part II	Won	
Golden Joystick Awards	November 24, 2020	Best Storytelling	The Last of Us Part II	Won	
Golden Joystick Awards	November 24, 2020	Best Visual Design	The Last of Us Part II	Won	
Golden Joystick Awards	November 24, 2020	Studio of the Year	Naughty Dog	Won	
Golden Reel Awards	April 16, 2021	Outstanding Achievement in Sound Editing – Computer Cinematic	Shannon Potter, Robert Krekel (Note: All recipients: Supervising sound editor: Shannon Potter; Sound effects editors: Patrick Ginn, Kyle Bailey, Michael Finley, Chad Bedell, Eric Paulsen, Keith Bilderbeck, Jim Diaz; Foley artists: Dawn Fintor, Alicia Stevenson; Audio director: Robert Krekel; Sound designers: Justin Mullens, Beau Jimenez, Neil Uchitel, Jesse Garcia, Michael Marchisotto; Supervising music editors: Rob Goodson, Scott Shoemaker; Music editors: Anthony Caruso, Tyler Crowder, Sonia Coronado, Adam Kallibjian, Adam Kallibjian, James Zolyak, Ted Kocher, Scott Bergstrom, Tao-Ping Chen)	Won	
Golden Reel Awards	April 16, 2021	Outstanding Achievement in Sound Editing – Computer Interactive Game Play	Shannon Potter, Robert Krekel (Note: All recipients: Audio director: Robert Krekel; Supervising sound editor: Shannon Potter; Supervising dialogue editor: Maged Khalil Ragab; Supervising music editors: Rob Goodson, Scott Shoemaker; Sound designers: Neil Uchitel, Beau Jimenez, Justin Mullens, Jesse Garcia, Michael Marchisotto, Derek Brown, Jordan Denton; Dialogue editors: Grayson Stone, Julius Kukla, Thomas Barrett, Jaime Marcelo, Erik Schmall, Duncan Brown, Cesar Marenco; Foley editor: Eolyne Arnold; Sound effects Editors: Patrick Ginn, Michael Finley, Kyle Bailey; Music editors: Anthony Caruso, Tyler Crowder, Tao-Ping Chen, Sonia Coronado, Adam Kallibjian, Samuel Marshall, James Zolyak, Ted Kocher, Scott Bergstrom; Foley artists: Dawn Fintor, Alicia Stevenson)	Won	
Hollywood Music in Media Awards	January 27, 2021	Outstanding Music Supervision — Video Game	Scott Hanau, Rob Goodson, and Scott Shoemaker	Nominated	
Hollywood Music in Media Awards	January 27, 2021	Original Score — Video Game	Gustavo Santaolalla and Mac Quayle	Nominated	
Hugo Awards	December 18, 2021	Best Video Game	The Last of Us Part II	Nominated	
Japan Game Awards	October 2, 2021	Award for Excellence	The Last of Us Part II	Won (Note: Also awarded to nine other games)	
New York Game Awards	January 26, 2021	Big Apple Award for Best Game of the Year	The Last of Us Part II	Nominated	
New York Game Awards	January 26, 2021	Tin Pan Alley Award for Best Music in a Game	The Last of Us Part II	Nominated	
New York Game Awards	January 26, 2021	Human Melville Award for Best Writing	The Last of Us Part II	Nominated	
New York Game Awards	January 26, 2021	Great White Way Award for Best Acting in a Game	Laura Bailey as Abby	Nominated	
New York Game Awards	January 26, 2021	Great White Way Award for Best Acting in a Game	Ashley Johnson as Ellie	Nominated	
The Steam Awards	January 3, 2026	Outstanding Story-Rich Game Award	The Last of Us Part II Remastered	Nominated	
SXSW Gaming Awards	March 20, 2021	Excellence in Narrative	The Last of Us Part II	Won	
SXSW Gaming Awards	March 20, 2021	Video Game of the Year	The Last of Us Part II	Nominated	
SXSW Gaming Awards	March 20, 2021	Matthew Crump Cultural Innovation Award	The Last of Us Part II	Nominated	
Titanium Awards	December 12, 2020	Game of the Year	The Last of Us Part II	Won	
Titanium Awards	December 12, 2020	Best Narrative Design	The Last of Us Part II	Won	
Titanium Awards	December 12, 2020	Best OST	The Last of Us Part II	Won	
Titanium Awards	December 12, 2020	Best Art	The Last of Us Part II	Nominated	
Visual Effects Society Awards	April 6, 2021	Outstanding Visual Effects in a Real-Time Project	Neil Druckmann, Eben Cook, Erick Pangilinan, John Sweeney	Nominated	
Webby Awards	May 18, 2021	Best Adventure Game	The Last of Us Part II	Won	
Webby Awards	May 18, 2021	Best User Experience	The Last of Us Part II	Won	
Webby Awards	May 18, 2021	Best Technical Achievement	The Last of Us Part II	Won	
Webby Awards	May 18, 2021	Best Adventure Game — People's Voice	The Last of Us Part II	Won	
Webby Awards	May 18, 2021	Best Game Design — People's Voice	The Last of Us Part II	Won	
Webby Awards	May 18, 2021	Best Music/Sound Design — People's Voice	The Last of Us Part II	Won	
Webby Awards	May 18, 2021	Best User Experience — People's Voice	The Last of Us Part II	Won	
Webby Awards	May 18, 2021	Best Technical Achievement — People's Voice	The Last of Us Part II	Won	
Webby Awards	May 18, 2021	Best Game Design	The Last of Us Part II	Nominated	
Webby Awards	May 18, 2021	Best Music/Sound Design	The Last of Us Part II	Nominated	
Webby Awards	April 26, 2022	Video Ad Shortform	"True Faith" Launch Spot (AKQA)	Honoree	
