= List of The Last of Us characters =

List of The Last of Us characters may refer to one of the following lists characters in The Last of Us franchise.

- Characters of The Last of Us, the 2013 video game
- Characters of The Last of Us Part II, the 2020 video game
- Characters of The Last of Us (TV series), the 2023 television series
