= Abby (The Last of Us) =

Video game character

Abby Anderson
- The Last of Us character
- First appearance: The Last of Us Part II (2020)
- Created by: Neil Druckmann; Halley Gross
- Portrayed by: Laura Bailey (video game); Kaitlyn Dever (TV series)

In-universe information
- Family: Jerry Anderson (father)
- Significant other: Owen Moore (ex-boyfriend)

Abigail Anderson is a character in the video game The Last of Us Part II (2020) by Naughty Dog. She is portrayed by Laura Bailey through performance capture in the game, and Kaitlyn Dever in the television adaptation. A soldier of the Washington Liberation Front (WLF), Abby seeks to avenge her father's death by killing Joel Miller. Her alliances later become unsettled when she befriends two ex-members of the Seraphites, a religious cult with which the WLF is locked in a war. Abby is one of two main playable characters in the game, alongside Ellie.

Abby was created by Neil Druckmann and Halley Gross, the writers of The Last of Us Part II. The original switch to playing as Abby was done to demonstrate her personality; Druckmann wanted players to hate Abby early in the game, but later empathize with her through her flaws and redemptive actions. He wanted to avoid casting Bailey due to her proliferation of roles, but was impressed with her audition tape in how she had played into Abby's vulnerability. Bailey worked out in preparation for the role, and gave birth to her first son during production. She also prepared by researching people involved in wars and their coping mechanisms. Abby's face was modeled on Jocelyn Mettler, while her body was based on Colleen Fotsch.

The character of Abby was well received by critics, with many noting that her redemption arc was believable and made the character likable by the game's end. Her playable chapters were controversial among players, and Bailey became the target of online death threats; some critics felt the character had been unfairly maligned and that criticisms of her muscular physique was a result of the lack of body diversity in video games. Bailey's performance was praised and she received accolades at the British Academy Games Awards, the Game Awards, and the NAVGTR Awards. Dever's performance in the television series has been similarly praised.

== Creation ==
=== Design and casting ===
Abby is described as having a "commanding presence", with her physical build reflecting the years of training and combat. Her design underwent several iterations, with the goal to portray her as "capable, utilitarian, and strong". When auditioning actors for Abby, creative director Neil Druckmann specifically wanted to avoid casting Laura Bailey due to her proliferation of roles; he had originally considered Bailey to play Dina. When reviewing her audition tape, however, Druckmann was impressed by how Bailey had played into Abby's vulnerability, whereas other actors emphasized her anger. Bailey considers the game important to her personally, as she gave birth to her first son during production. Prior to her pregnancy, Bailey was working out in preparation for the role. While pregnant, she attempted to conceal her walk during her performance. She prepared for the role by researching people involved in wars and their coping mechanisms. While performing the scene in which Abby kills Joel—portrayed by Bailey's friend Troy Baker—Bailey continually checked in with Baker due to the intensity of the scene. Abby's face is based on Jocelyn Mettler, a visual effects artist who formerly worked at Naughty Dog, while her body was based on athlete Colleen Fotsch.

=== Writing ===
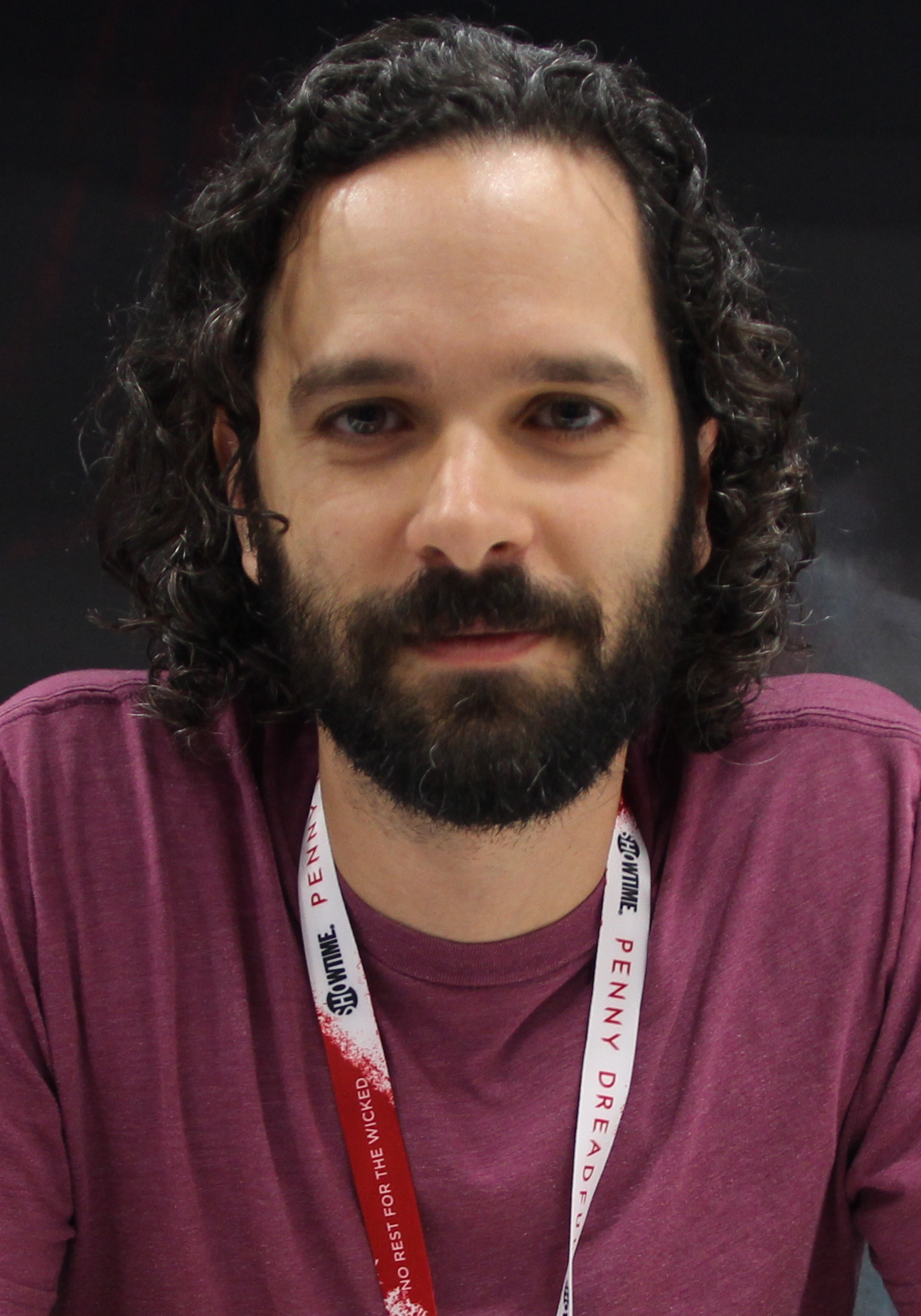
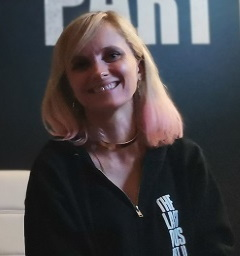
Creative director Neil Druckmann (left) developed the character of Abby with co-writer Halley Gross (right).

An early iteration of the story had a young Abby witnessing an attack on her group by Joel and Tommy, who were hunters at the time (in the unseen 20 years of the first game), and vowing revenge. As the story and its theme of violence developed, the writers found it more interesting for Abby's father to have been killed by the player in the first game and directly tie into Joel's actions. The switch to Abby in the game's first chapter was done to demonstrate her personality and vulnerabilities and avoid her portrayal as a typical antagonist. She was originally set to be the primary playable character for the game's early hours before killing Joel, but the plot was restructured, and Druckmann felt that personalizing the character too early in the game was "too easy"; he wanted players to hate Abby early in the game, but later empathize with her. He avoided writing her as a "perfect" character, instead prompting empathy through her flaws and redemptive actions. Druckmann told Bailey to avoid smiling as Abby, noting that "it should feel like a reward if she's smiling". One of Abby's most notable vulnerabilities is her crippling fear of heights.

Some of the game's flashback scenes with Abby initially depicted her joining the WLF, though it was an unconscious decision on her behalf, as the leader of the WLF was a fellow member of her former group and acted as a father figure for her. Abby's goal to kill Joel was fueled by her desire to return to a world before her father's death, but she discovers it impossible. After witnessing Owen's refusal to give up looking for a "light" in a world of darkness, she finds her own purpose in protecting Yara and Lev, which Druckmann felt mirrored Joel's redemption arc from the first game. Owen represents emotion in contrast to Abby's pessimism. The obstacles she overcomes when gathering medical supplies to save Yara's life demonstrates the lengths to which she will go to help the children and redeem herself. Margenau felt that Abby was inspired to abandon her alliances after witnessing Lev's rebellious nature. Abby's plea to the Santa Barbara Rattlers to leave Lev alone is an intentional parallel with Ellie's plea for Abby to spare Joel earlier in the game. While shooting the final part of Abby and Ellie's climactic fight, in which Ellie tries to drown Abby by grabbing her throat and pinning her down in shallow water before eventually sparing her, Bailey held her breath for the entire section; Ashley Johnson, who plays Ellie, let go when she realized that Bailey's lips were turning blue. Bailey felt that Abby understood Ellie's emotions by the game's end, having dealt with her own father's death.

=== Television series ===
Kaitlyn Dever's casting as Abby in the second season of HBO's television adaptation of the video games was announced on January 9, 2024. The production team wanted to start the season's casting with Abby; casting for the role began before the strike, and Dever became the frontrunner after the strike ended in November, following the response to her performance in No One Will Save You (2023). She previously appeared in Naughty Dog's Uncharted 4: A Thief's End (2016), and was considered to play Ellie in the abandoned film adaptation of The Last of Us around the time, having attended a table read for the role and visited Naughty Dog during development of Part II; series co-creator Craig Mazin later suggested her as Abby. He sought an actor who could approach the character from different angles: as both a hero viewers love and a villain they despise. Dever's casting was announced on January 9, 2024.

Having spoken with Mazin and Druckmann, Dever was aware of Abby's divisiveness among players of the game but chose to approach the character "with fresh eyes". She played through the games with her father, who is a fan, but did not speak with Bailey on Druckmann's recommendation. Abby is less muscular in the series than the game, which the writers attributed to the former focusing more on drama than action, with less violence. Druckmann also felt it was "not worth passing ... up" an opportunity to work with Dever to continue searching for actors who matched Abby's physicality. Mazin felt the character was more physically vulnerable but spiritually stronger in the series. Dever prepared for production by training to become stronger. She sought to "do the character justice" while bringing her "own sort of energy" to the role, wanting to explore Abby's grief, motivations, and empathy. Dever's mother died shortly before production, and her first day on set was three days after the funeral; her mother's excitement for the role inspired her to continue. Dever found the experience of keeping secrets to avoid spoilers new and nerve-wracking.

== Appearances ==
Abby's father, Jerry Anderson, was a Firefly surgeon whom Joel killed at the end of the first game to save Ellie. Four years later, in her early twenties, she tracks Joel down in Jackson, Wyoming, and beats him to death. Some time later, back in Seattle, Abby learns that her ex-boyfriend Owen has gone missing while investigating the Seraphites, a religious cult locked in a war with the Washington Liberation Front (WLF), the militia of which Abby is a member. WLF leader Isaac Dixon believes Owen may have defected, and plans to assault the Seraphites' nearby island settlement. Searching for Owen, Abby is captured and witnesses the Seraphites shatter the arm of a runaway Seraphite named Yara. After being rescued by Yara and her younger brother Lev, Abby leaves them to find Owen. He plans to sail to Santa Barbara, California, where the Fireflies are supposedly regrouping, and the two have a romantic encounter. The next morning, Abby returns to find Yara and Lev, and brings them to the aquarium. Yara's arm requires amputation, so Abby and Lev retrieve medical supplies from the hospital, which is overrun by Infected.

After the surgery, Lev runs away to the Seraphite settlement to convince their mother to leave the cult. Abby and Yara pursue him, fending off an attack from Tommy, Joel's vengeful younger brother. At the settlement, they discover Lev has killed his devout mother in self-defense. As the WLF attack the settlement, Yara kills Isaac and sacrifices herself to let Abby and Lev escape. Abby and Lev return to the aquarium to find Owen and his pregnant girlfriend Mel killed and a map leading to Ellie's theater hideout. At the theater, Abby kills Jesse and shoots Tommy, crippling him. She overpowers Ellie and Dina but, after learning that Dina is pregnant, spares them at Lev's insistence and warns them to leave. Some time later, Abby and Lev arrive in Santa Barbara searching for the Fireflies, but are captured by the Rattlers, a gang of slave-keeping bandits. After being weakened by months of torture, they are rescued by Ellie. Threatening to kill Lev, Ellie forces Abby to fight her. Ellie overpowers her but lets her live. Abby sails away with Lev towards the Firefly base on Catalina Island.

== Reception ==
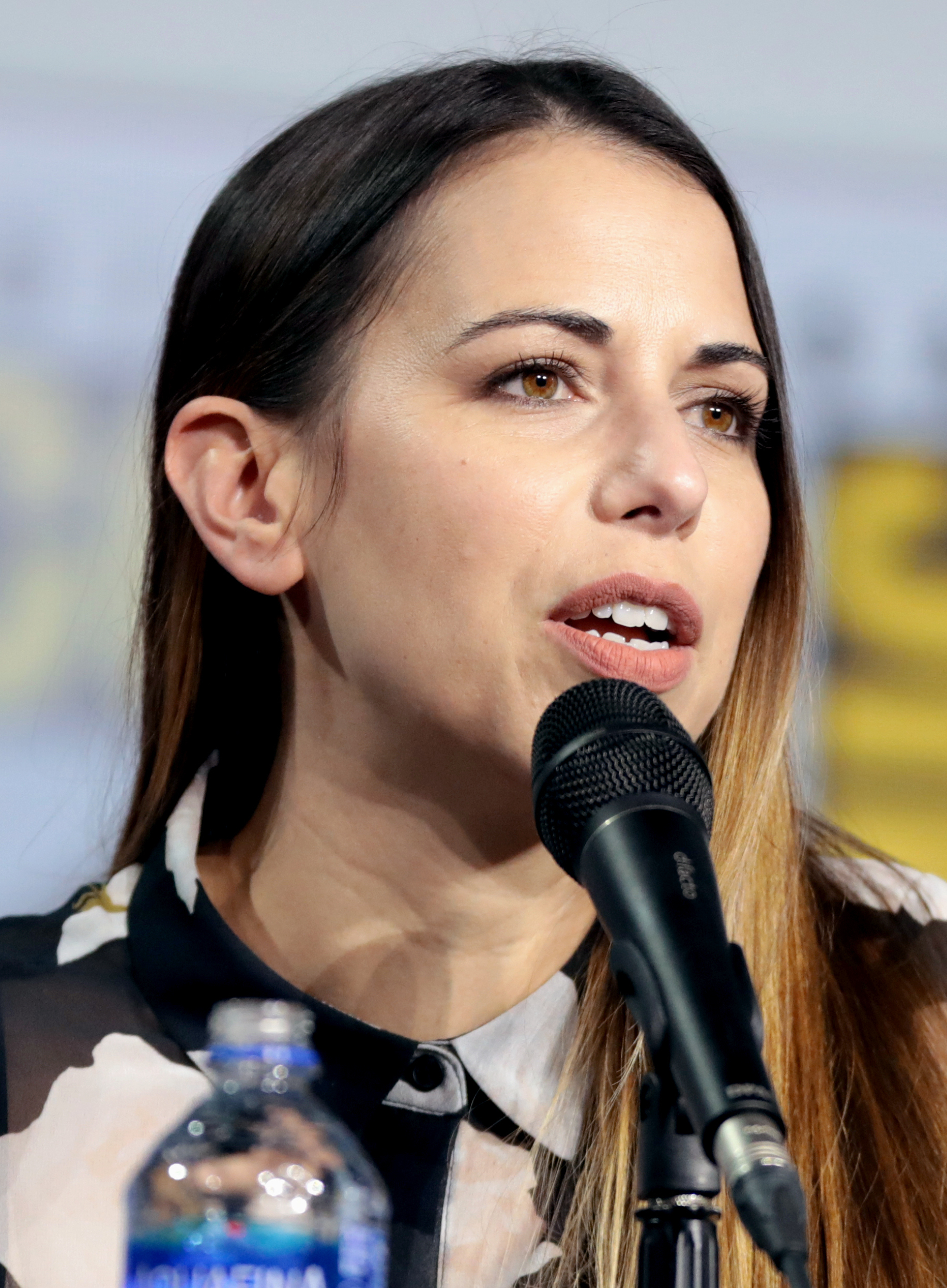
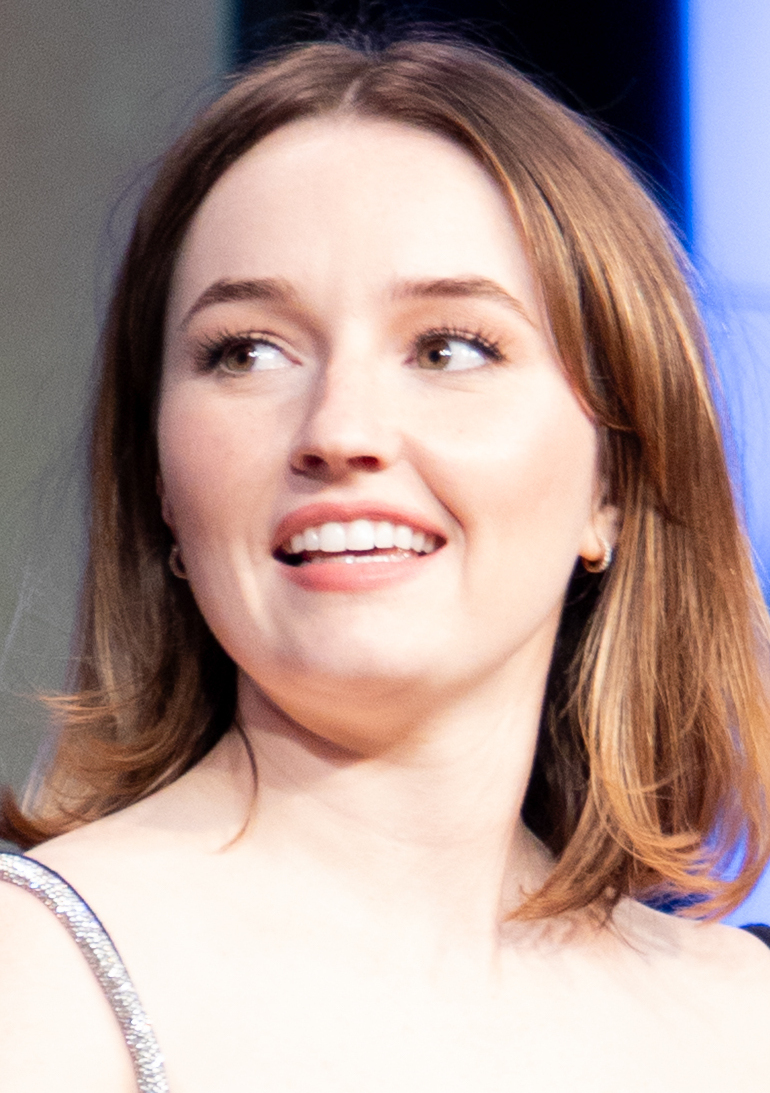
Laura Bailey's (left) performance as Abby in the game was praised and awarded, and Kaitlyn Dever's (right) performance was considered a highlight of the second television season.

Abby received positive feedback from critics and Bailey's performance was praised. Den of Geek's John Saavedra lauded Bailey for bringing Abby to life and making the player empathize with her by the game's end. He lauded the character's camaraderie with her companions, particularly Manny. VG247's Caitlin Galiz-Rowe found Abby's redemption arc more believable and important than others. NPR's Jason Sheehan wrote that witnessing Abby's perspective proved her revenge was "just as earned" as Ellie's. USgamer's Kat Bailey appreciated the ambition of the player switch but felt it "just barely" pulled it off. VentureBeat's Dean Takahashi concluded that Abby redeemed herself by sparing Ellie and praised Naughty Dog's ability to make the character likable. Rafael Motamayor of Observer found Abby's story as interesting as Ellie's and felt its use within the story made Ellie a better character. Mashable's Jess Joho considered Abby's story more nuanced and compelling, but criticized both characters for relying too heavily on their relationships with their fathers; she felt the story was at its best with Abby and Lev.

A subset of players criticized Abby and disapproved of her playable chapters due to her actions and the expectation that Ellie would be the primary playable character. Collider's Dave Trumbore felt Abby's killing of Joel led to her being unfairly maligned by audiences who had failed to understand the story's message and subtext. Some players criticized Abby's muscular physique, and theories spread online that she was transgender; Polygon's Patricia Hernandez and The Independent's Amy Coles argued that this perception was a result of the lack of body diversity in games, and that the story showed Abby had the resources to achieve her physique. Bailey became the target of online death threats in response to the character; Naughty Dog released a statement condemning the threats, and Bailey was supported by James Gunn, Ashley Johnson, and Craig Mazin, among others. Bailey spoke to friends like Druckmann and Johnson at the time of the controversy. She said that she continues to "see the remnants of it online" in February 2022.

For her role, Bailey won Performer in a Leading Role at the 17th British Academy Games Awards, Best Performance at the Game Awards 2020 and from IGN, and was co-winner of Outstanding Lead Performance in a Drama at the NAVGTR Awards with Johnson. Bailey was nominated for Best Voice Performance at the 19th Game Audio Network Guild Awards and Great White Way Award for Best Acting in a Game at the 10th Annual New York Game Awards, and Abby was nominated for Outstanding Achievement in Character at the 24th Annual D.I.C.E. Awards.

TVLine's Dave Nemetz considered Dever the highlight of the television series's second season, and some critics felt she upstaged all others', including the lead performers. Her performance was lauded for her portrayal of grief, rage, and hatred; TheWrap's Chase Hutchinson felt her eyes effectively conveyed her agony. /Film's Jeremy Mathai wrote that it "takes all of one scene to show why the complaints surrounding her casting were always profoundly misguided". Some reviewers felt Abby's role in the second season was to primarily establish her for the third; The Hollywood Reporter's Angie Han found "she registers more as a plot point than as a person". Paste's Elijah Gonzalez applauded Dever's acting but felt she was unable to "embody the intimidating physicality of her in-game counterpart". Dever was nominated for Guest Actress in a Drama Series at the 5th Astra TV Awards and Outstanding Guest Actress in a Drama Series at the 77th Primetime Creative Arts Emmy Awards.

== Bibliography ==
- Tucker, Ian, ed. (June 2020), The Art of The Last of Us Part II, United States of America: Dark Horse Comics
