= Ellie (The Last of Us) =

Video game character

- The Last of Us character
- Ellie in The Last of Us Part II (2020)
- First appearance: The Last of Us: American Dreams (2013)
- First game: The Last of Us (2013)
- Created by: Neil Druckmann; Bruce Straley
- Portrayed by: Ashley Johnson (games); Bella Ramsey (TV series)

In-universe information
- Family: Anna (mother, deceased); Joel (surrogate father)
- Significant other: Dina (girlfriend) (Note: Part II's ending leaves Ellie and Dina's relationship status ambiguous.)
- Children: JJ (adoptive son)

Ellie (Note: Ellie's original surname Williams was scrapped early in development; it was an homage to game developers Ken and Roberta Williams. Some publications used the surname in discussing the television series, and it is featured on an optional outfit in The Last of Us Part II Remastered (2024).) is a character in the video game series The Last of Us by Naughty Dog. She is portrayed by Ashley Johnson through performance capture in the games, and by Bella Ramsey in the television adaptation. In the first game, The Last of Us (2013), Joel Miller is tasked with escorting a 14-year-old Ellie across a post-apocalyptic United States in an attempt to create a cure for an infection to which Ellie is immune. While players briefly assume control of Ellie, the artificial intelligence primarily controls her actions. Ellie reappeared as the playable character in the downloadable content prequel The Last of Us: Left Behind, in which she spends time with her friend Riley. In The Last of Us Part II (2020), players control a 19-year-old Ellie as she seeks revenge on Abby.

Ellie was created by Neil Druckmann and Bruce Straley, the directors of The Last of Us. Inspired by a mute character proposed for Uncharted 2: Among Thieves, they created her as a strong female character who has a close relationship with Joel. Throughout the first game's development, the relationship between Ellie and Joel was the focus. Johnson inspired aspects of Ellie's personality, prompting Druckmann to make her more active in fighting enemies. Following comparisons to the likeness of Canadian actor Elliot Page, Naughty Dog redesigned Ellie's appearance to better reflect Johnson's personality and make her younger. For Part II, Johnson considered her own experiences with anxiety and researched the effects of post-traumatic stress disorder.

The character has been well received by critics, with Ellie's relationship with Joel most frequently the subject of praise. The strength and complexity of her character, and its subversion of the damsel in distress stereotype, have also been commended. A scene in which Ellie and Riley kiss in Left Behind drew social commentary and was commended as a leap for LGBT representation in video games. Johnson's performance in Part II was praised for her depiction of vulnerability and suffering. The character and performance received numerous awards and nominations, and have placed favorably in polls and lists. Ramsey's performance in the television series has been similarly praised.

== Creation ==
The concept for Ellie began with an unused idea for Uncharted 2: Among Thieves (2009). Neil Druckmann and Bruce Straley, directors of The Last of Us (2013), conceived a sequence with a mute female character who would accompany Uncharted protagonist Nathan Drake; Druckmann felt this would create a "beautiful" relationship through gameplay alone. An early alternative name for the character was Lily; Druckmann chose Ellie as he had considered the name for his daughter. Druckmann, who wrote The Last of Us, designed Ellie as a counterpart to Joel, the main playable character. She was also intended to demonstrate that a character bond could be created entirely through gameplay. Druckmann described the game as a coming of age story for Ellie, in which she adopts the qualities of a survivor.

=== Casting ===
Ashley Johnson was cast as Ellie in The Last of Us shortly after her auditions; the development team felt that she fit the role, particularly when acting alongside Troy Baker, who portrayed Joel. Johnson made important contributions to Ellie's character development. She convinced Druckmann to give Ellie a more independent personality, and to make her more successful in combat. As Ellie, Johnson's performances were mostly recorded using motion capture technology which produced approximately 85% of the game's animations. The remaining audio elements were recorded later in a studio. Johnson was sometimes uncomfortable while performing "disturbing" scenes. However, she was excited to play a rare example of a strong female video game character. For The Last of Us Part II (2020), Johnson considered her own experiences with anxiety, and researched the effects of post-traumatic stress disorder (PTSD) with Druckmann.

=== Appearance ===
The various iterations that Ellie's physical appearance underwent throughout development. Each design was tested with various hair colors and styles.

The team felt that establishing Ellie's appearance was critical. They determined that she needed to appear young enough to make her relationship with Joel—who is in his 40s—believable, but old enough to be credible as a resourceful teenager capable of surviving. The team also considered Ellie important for marketing; Druckmann said that, when asked to move the image of Ellie from the front of the game's packaging to the back, "everyone at Naughty Dog just flat-out refused".

Following the announcement of The Last of Us, comparisons were made between Ellie and actor Elliot Page. Page claimed that Naughty Dog had "ripped off" his likeness and that it was "not appreciated", as he was acting in another game, Beyond: Two Souls (2013). According to Straley, Naughty Dog had no knowledge of Page's involvement in Beyond, which was announced several months after The Last of Us. Kotaku observed that some players would likely confuse the characters. Straley said that, following the comparisons, Naughty Dog revised Ellie's appearance because "we want our characters to stand on their own two feet". Druckmann and Straley said the change was made to better reflect Johnson's personality and make her younger. It was revealed in a trailer in May 2012.

For Part II, Ellie's look underwent years of iteration; the team wanted a logical transition from the first game while maintaining a "practical yet personal" outfit. Lead character artist Ashley Swidowski designed Ellie's eyes to demonstrate a somberness; in the first game, Ellie had wider eyes to reflect her childlike nature. Ellie's moth tattoo was designed by the California-based artist Natalie Hall after the team struggled to settle on a design. Hall drew the tattoo on a developer's arm so the team could visualize it. Druckmann felt that moths' obsession with light mirrored Ellie's obsession in the game, and served as a reminder of Joel.

=== Writing ===
The Last of Us: Left Behind (2014) was written to specifically focus on the relationship between Ellie and Riley, and to recount the events that defined their later personalities. Druckmann was also inspired by wars that took place in Syria and Afghanistan; he felt that, like Ellie, conflict was familiar to the children in those countries. Left Behind sees Riley's behavior change Ellie, resulting in the latter's focus to fight in order to save those close to her. The team was also interested in Ellie's behavior around Riley; she is perceived as being more playful. In Left Behind, Ellie and Riley share a kiss; the team considered omitting the kiss from the game, but felt that it was imperative to the story and strengthened the relationship. Though initially he felt that Ellie viewed Riley only as an influence, Druckmann later considered her romantic appeal, and decided to explore the concept.

For Part II, Druckmann recalled the team's excitement to explore Ellie further as a protagonist, particularly developing the loss of her innocence, comparing it to the feeling of the writers of Breaking Bad (2008–2013) when given the opportunity to explore Walter White. The team discussed creating a sequel without Ellie and Joel, but felt that they were less interesting. Ellie's excitement for astronomy was based on Johnson's own interests, while her obsession with comics is based on Druckmann's childhood. Part II co-writer and narrative lead Halley Gross felt that Ellie's decision to track down Abby was motivated by her desire to overcome her PTSD more than her desire to kill Abby. Gross, who has suffered from PTSD, considered it her responsibility to accurately depict the subject matter; she wanted players who might have suffered with trauma to understand that they are not alone.

The writers wanted to deconstruct the perception of violence in Joel and Ellie: while Joel is indifferent and practical, Ellie kills to maintain a "culture of honor" by attaching violence to her ego. Some of the team considered Ellie's obsession with Abby akin to a drug addiction, and that Dina left as she felt that the obsession would never end. Gross considered the game's final shot, wherein Ellie leaves behind the guitar that Joel gave her, represented Ellie moving on from his death to a new chapter. Druckmann felt that it represented Ellie finally overcoming her ego, but preferred that the player create their own interpretation.

=== Gameplay ===
For The Last of Us, Ellie's artificial intelligence (AI) required significant overhauling of the game engine. The team had her stay close to Joel, to avoid being viewed by players as a burden. AI programmer Max Dyckhoff said that, to ensure Ellie made realistic decisions during gameplay, he considered "what she was going through" and "what her relationship with Joel and the enemies would be". During the winter segment of The Last of Us, players assume control of Ellie. The developers ensured that this change, as well as the knowledge of Ellie's immunity, was kept secret prior to the game's release to surprise players.

=== Television series ===
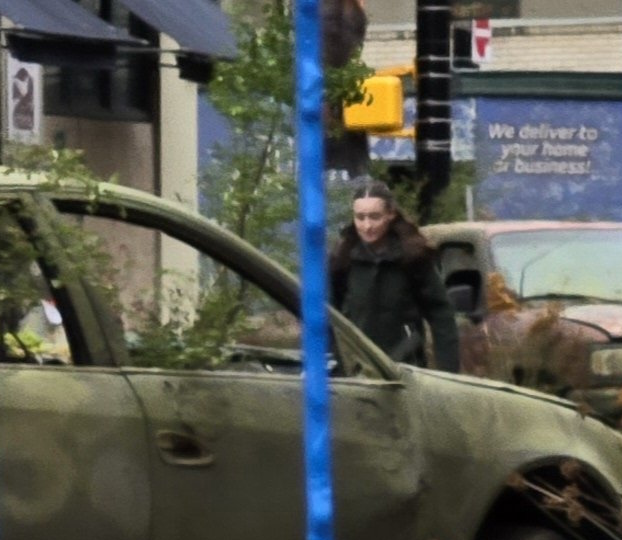
Bella Ramsey filming the second season of The Last of Us in Downtown Vancouver in August 2024

Bella Ramsey's casting as Ellie in HBO's television adaptation of the games was announced on February 10, 2021. Actors considered for the canceled film adaptation—like Maisie Williams and Kaitlyn Dever—had aged out of consideration, resulting in a reset of candidates. Around 105 actors were considered; the producers sought a performer who could portray a resourceful, quirky, and potentially violent character. David Benioff and D. B. Weiss—showrunners of Game of Thrones, in which Ramsey had a recurring role—assured the producers of Ramsey's talent; they secured the role less than a month later, receiving the news during production on a different project. They were aware of the games but encouraged not to play it to avoid replicating Johnson's performance; they watched gameplay on YouTube to "get a sense of it", wanting their performance to be reminiscent of the games without copying them.

Ramsey, who is English, learned an American accent and had to cut off over 15 inches of hair for the first season. They wore a chest binder for 90% of production for better focus on set. Ramsey struggled to return to their normal life and accent after the first season, calling it "a grieving process" to let go of Ellie and suffering "withdrawal symptoms from set". Johnson plays Ellie's mother Anna in the first-season finale, which depicts Ellie's birth. Druckmann intended to adapt Anna's story as short film or downloadable content but "it fell apart". He and series co-creator Craig Mazin simultaneously thought of casting Johnson, considering her inclusion important due to her relationship with the games; Druckmann said Johnson "gave birth to Ellie" figuratively in the game and literally in the series.

Ramsey approached the second season the same as the first, feeling the writing effectively demonstrated Ellie's growth, such as her attempted emulation of Joel and his hardened behavior; they wanted to "feel [Ellie's] heaviness", leaning into both her similarities with Joel and her uniqueness. Ramsey added a "green rider" into their second-season contract, requiring all production departments to adopt sustainable practices. While they lived with their mother during production of the first season, they chose to live alone during the second, reflective of Ellie's growing independence. Ramsey was more concerned about emotional scenes than physical ones, remaining "as light and energetic as possible"; they prepared for Joel's death scene by listening to the Buckwheat Boyz's "Peanut Butter Jelly Time" on a loop to offset the darkness and exhaustion, as well as Dan Reeder's "Fuzzyfalafelosophy". Ramsey felt Ellie allowed them to experience and "explore a really vast array of emotions, sometimes all of them at the same time".

Ramsey found the second season "a lonelier experience" due to their separation from Pascal and faced difficulty during argumentative scenes due to their own close relationship with their father. They were saddened by Pascal's departure to their bond but felt prepared to step up as the primary lead actor and set the tone. Ramsey felt their own experience with "love" while filming the second season—in which Ellie has a love interest—was "really special". Mazin found Ellie's combat encounters more interesting due to Ramsey's size, exploring techniques used by shorter people against larger enemies. He regularly checked in with Ramsey during production due to the intensity of the stunt work. Ramsey trained in boxing, jiu-jitsu, and weight training for two months before filming; they found the stunts enjoyable but exhausting. They were concerned their body type did not match Ellie's in the game, particularly in their lack of muscle definition, but Mazin wanted Ellie's strength to be conveyed more in her posture and confidence; he felt he had witnessed the growth in Ramsey's personality and emotional maturity between seasons, which is reflected in the series.

== Character ==
Ellie is described as "mature beyond her years" as a result of the circumstances of her environment. She is characterized as strong, witty, and "a little rough around the edges". Her emotional trauma is accentuated after her encounter with David. Having lost many people in her life, she suffers from severe monophobia and survivor's guilt. This results in her becoming a very hardened person; she uses violence without hesitation and frequently employs profane language. Ellie also feels worthless, believing her life is a burden and that her death would be beneficial for others. While she shows initiative, she is not as adept at survival as Joel, being somewhat impulsive and naïve. She is unable to swim in the first game, though Joel teaches her in the years before Part II. She displays great physical resilience, emotional strength, and complete fearlessness; this is demonstrated by her ability to look after both herself and Joel when he is severely injured. She constantly perseveres in dire situations. Ellie is a lesbian, pursuing female romantic interests in both Left Behind and Part II.

== Appearances ==
Ellie in The Last of Us (2013)

Ellie's mother, Anna, was forced to give her up shortly after she was born, and she was initially raised by Anna's friend Marlene. Ellie attends a military boarding school in the Boston quarantine zone, where she befriends Riley Abel, a fellow rebel who protects her from bullies, as depicted in the comic book series The Last of Us: American Dreams. During the events of Left Behind, which is set three weeks before The Last of Us, Riley returns after a long absence and tells Ellie that she has joined the Fireflies, a revolutionary militia group. Riley abandons her Firefly pendant when Ellie pleads for her to remain, and they kiss. After they are bitten by Infected, the two consider suicide, but choose to spend their final hours together. However, Ellie survives and discovers she is immune to infection.

In The Last of Us, a wounded Marlene tasks Joel with escorting Ellie from Boston to a drop-off point in Colorado to help the Fireflies develop a vaccine from her immunity. Ellie is initially annoyed by Joel's surliness, but they develop a bond. Upon learning that he intends to leave her with his younger brother Tommy and return to Boston, she runs away. After Joel pursues her, she confronts him, insisting that he not abandon her, and they continue their journey. Ellie becomes traumatized and withdrawn after an encounter in which she is assaulted and nearly murdered by a band of cannibals, forcing her to hack their leader David to death with a machete. After finding the Colorado base destroyed, Joel and Ellie finally reach the Fireflies at a hospital in Salt Lake City, where Joel discovers that the Fireflies cannot create a vaccine without killing Ellie during surgery because they must remove the mutant strain of the fungus from her brain. He kills Marlene and the Fireflies, makes his way to the operating room, and carries the unconscious Ellie to safety. He later lies to Ellie, telling her that the Fireflies had already found dozens of other immune people and had stopped seeking a cure. When Ellie confronts Joel, describing her survivor's guilt and her urge to know the truth, he reassures her that he is telling the truth.

In The Last of Us Part II, Ellie and Joel have settled in Tommy's community in Jackson. Joel gifts Ellie a guitar, fulfilling his promise to teach her how to play. Ellie eventually returns to the Firefly hospital and discovers the truth. She is furious with Joel, feeling that her life would have mattered had the surgery gone ahead. The relationship between the two is strained. Ellie eventually promises Joel that she will try to forgive him, but she witnesses his murder the next day at the hands of Abby, a militia soldier and the daughter of the Firefly surgeon Joel had killed while saving Ellie. Along with girlfriend Dina, Tommy, and Dina's ex-boyfriend Jesse, Ellie travels to the militia's home turf in Seattle to exact revenge. Along the way, Ellie reveals her immunity to Dina, and Dina reveals she is pregnant with Jesse's child. After Ellie kills several members of Abby's group, Abby kills Jesse, cripples Tommy, and overpowers Ellie and Dina. She spares their lives and tells them to leave Seattle. Some time later, Ellie and Dina are living on a farm near Jackson and raising Dina's baby, JJ, but Ellie suffers from post-traumatic stress. Despite Dina's pleas, Ellie tracks Abby to Santa Barbara, where she frees an enslaved Abby from a group of bandits. She then has a flashback to Joel's death, and forces Abby into a fight. Abby bites off two of Ellie's fingers, but Ellie overpowers and starts drowning her; she ultimately lets Abby go after experiencing a happier memory of Joel. Ellie returns to the farmhouse and finds it empty. She struggles to play Joel's guitar with her missing fingers. She recalls her promise to forgive Joel, leaves the guitar, and walks away.

== Reception ==
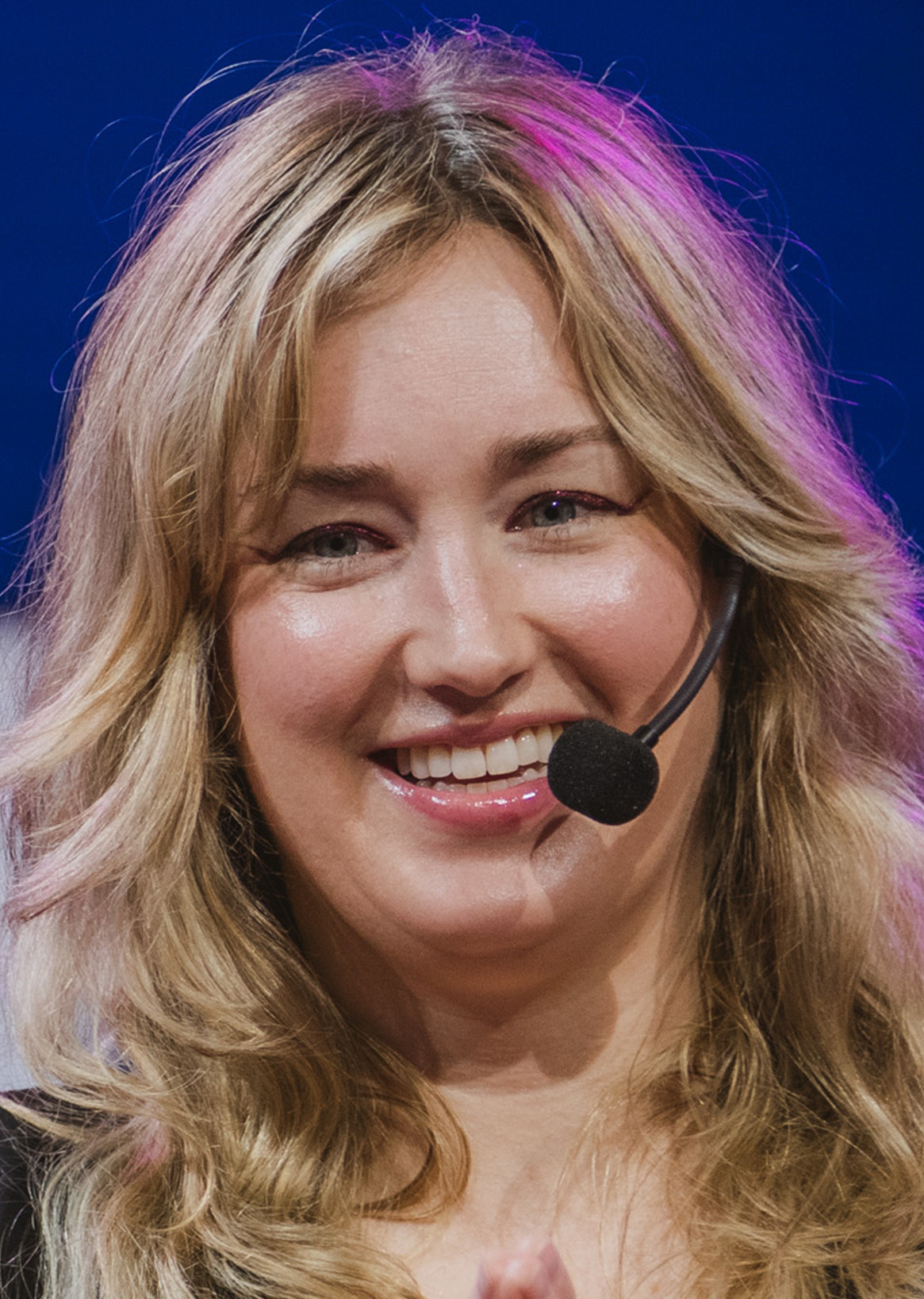
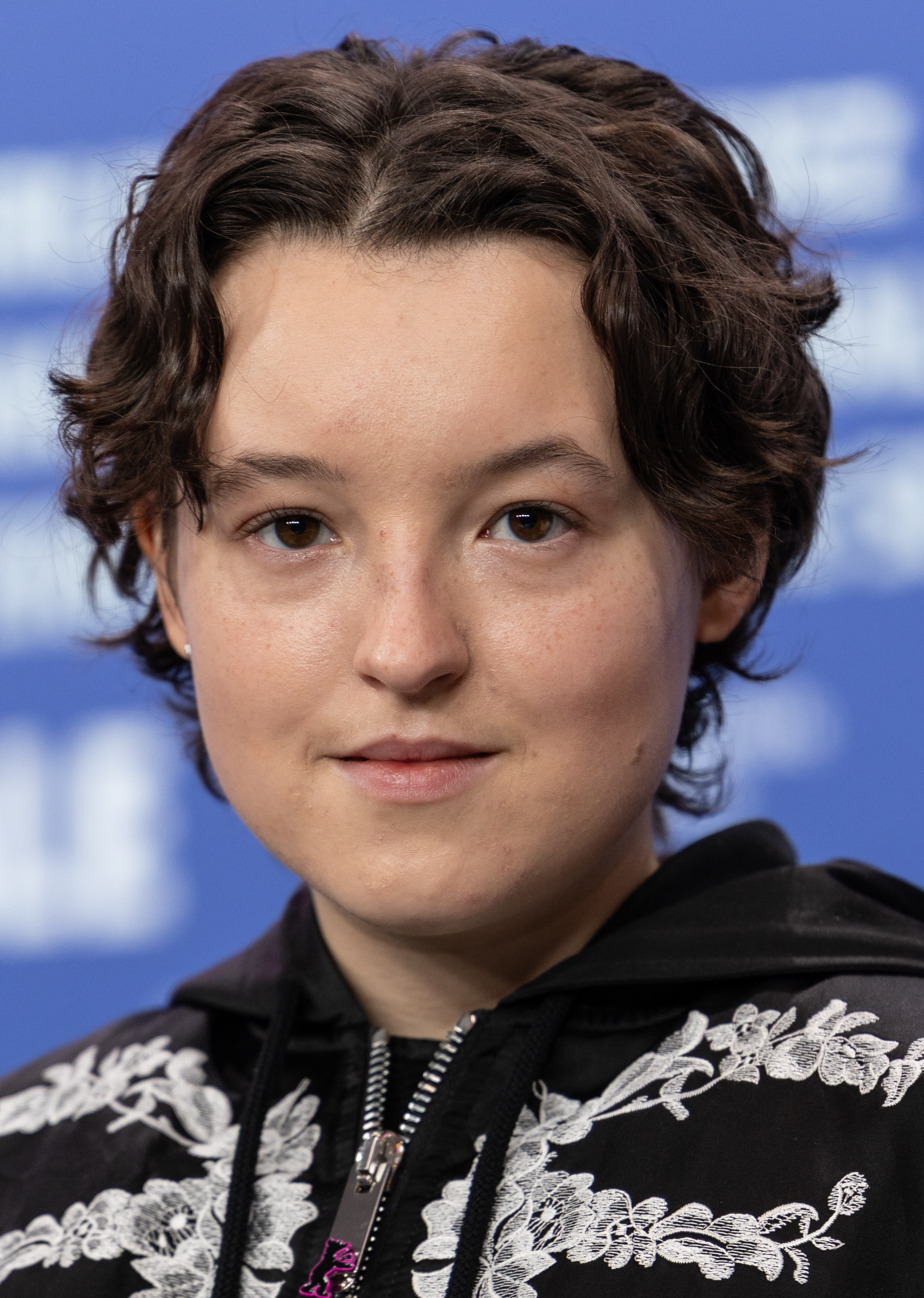
Critics praised Ashley Johnson's (left) performance as Ellie in the video games and Bella Ramsey's (right) in television series. Both received awards and nominations.

Ellie's character received positive feedback. Jason Killingsworth of Edge praised Ellie's complexity and commended Naughty Dog for not having made her "a subordinate ... precocious teen girl that Joel must babysit". Ashley Reed and Andy Hartup of GamesRadar named Ellie one of the "most inspirational female characters in games", writing that she is "one of the most modern, realistic characters ever designed". Eurogamer's Ellie Gibson commended the character's strength and vulnerability, praising the game's subversion of the damsel in distress cliché. GamesRadar listed Ellie among the best characters of the video game generation, stating that her courage exceeds that of most male characters. IGN's Greg Miller compared Ellie to Elizabeth from BioShock Infinite (2013), and felt that the former was a "much more rounded out, full-fledged" character. Conversely, Game Informer's Kimberley Wallace felt that the game focused too much on Joel, "hardly capitalizing on Ellie's importance", and Chris Suellentrop of The New York Times judged that Ellie is cast "in a secondary, more subordinate role".

Critics praised the relationship between Ellie and Joel. Matt Helgeson of Game Informer wrote that the relationship was "poignant" and "well-drawn", Joystiq's Richard Mitchell found it "genuine" and emotional, and IGN's Colin Moriarty identified it as a highlight of the game. Eurogamer's Oli Welsh felt the characters were developed with "real patience and skill". Philip Kollar of Polygon found the relationship was assisted by the game's optional conversations. Wallace of Game Informer named Joel and Ellie one of the "best gaming duos of 2013", appreciating their interest in protecting each other. Game Informer's Kyle Hilliard compared Joel and Ellie's relationship to that of the Prince and Elika from Prince of Persia (2008), writing that both duos care deeply for one another, and praising the "emotional crescendo" in The Last of Us, which he judged had not been achieved in Prince of Persia. PlayStation Official Magazine's David Meikleham named Joel and Ellie the best characters in a PlayStation 3 game.

Following the release of Left Behind, Ellie's relationship with Riley was commended by reviewers. GameSpot's Tom McShea felt a new appreciation for Ellie by seeing her actions around Riley. The Daily Telegraph's Tim Martin praised the characters' interactions, and Eurogamer's Stace Harman felt that Left Behind improves the understanding of Joel and Ellie's relationship. Kotaku's Kirk Hamilton described Ellie and Riley's kiss as "video gaming's latest breakthrough moment", declaring it "a big deal". Keza MacDonald of IGN wrote that the kiss was "so beautiful and natural and funny that [she] was left dumbstruck". Toh Weimin enjoyed the realistic portrayal of Ellie's sexual identity—an important part of her character instead of simply voyeurism. IGN's Luke Karmali questioned Naughty Dog's motivation behind the kiss, noting the "bait-and-switch" in which they made players care for the character before revealing her sexuality, but ultimately dismissed this and commended the handling of Ellie's sexuality and the subtlety of the writing. Polygon's Colin Campbell named Ellie and Riley among the best video game characters of the 2010s, citing their differences and eventual closeness.

Johnson received acclaim for her performance in The Last of Us Part II. Destructoid's Chris Carter praised her ability to play the character again after many years. Oli Welsh of Eurogamer found Johnson's performance to be "standout" due to her depiction of "rawness, vulnerability, and rage". GamesRadar+'s Alex Avard considered Johnson's portrayal of suffering "nothing short of awards worthy". Regarding the character, Jonathon Dornbush of IGN wrote that Johnson added nuance to every element of Ellie. The Washington Post's Elise Favis praised the game's depiction of Ellie coming out to Joel, comparing it to her own experience and the difficulty of approaching the topic with her father. CinemaBlend's Alexandra Ramos considered Ellie the "first-ever female protagonist in a blockbuster game who was lesbian", praising her relationship with Dina. Rafael Motamayor of Observer felt that Ellie's character was improved by the inclusion of Abby's story. Mashable's Jess Joho criticized the character for relying too heavily on her relationship with Joel. Polygon's Maddy Myers and Wired's Julie Muncy criticized Ellie's development and inability to learn from her mistakes.

Ellie won year-end awards for The Last of Us and Left Behind, including Best New Character from Hardcore Gamer and Most Valuable Character at the SXSW Gaming Awards for Left Behind; she received a nomination for Best Character from Destructoid. Ashley Johnson's performance also received various accolades: Performer at the 10th and 11th British Academy Video Games Awards, Outstanding Character Performance at the 17th Annual D.I.C.E. Awards, Best Voice Actress at the Spike VGX 2013, and Best Performer from The Daily Telegraph. For her role in The Last of Us Part II, Johnson was named co-winner of Outstanding Lead Performance in a Drama at the National Academy of Video Game Trade Reviewers (NAVGTR) Awards. She was also nominated for Best Performance at The Game Awards 2020 and from IGN, and Performer in a Leading Role at the 17th British Academy Games Awards; she lost all three awards to Laura Bailey, who played Abby. Johnson was nominated for Best Voice Performance at the 19th Game Audio Network Guild Awards and Ellie for Outstanding Achievement in Character at the 24th Annual D.I.C.E. Awards. In 2024, Ellie was ranked the nineteenth most iconic game character in a BAFTA poll with over 4,000 respondents.

In the television series, Ramsey's performance and chemistry with Pedro Pascal's Joel received high praise. By the fourth episode, Push Square's Aaron Bayne felt Ramsey's performance would win over viewers who doubted their casting, lauding their portrayal of both trauma and humor. Den of Geek's Bernard Boo thought the sixth episode featured "possibly the best performances of [their] career". IGN's Simon Cardy praised their ability to switch between emotion and comedy. Bleeding Cool's Tom Chang called Ramsey's seventh-episode performance in "award-worthy" and their strongest to date. In the eighth, Den of Geek's Boo lauded Ramsey's ability to portray toughness while maintaining vulnerability, and The Washington Post's Gene Park wrote their performance "should finally erase" any remaining doubts. Ramsey received several awards nominations, including at the Golden Globe Awards, Television Critics Association Awards, and two at the Primetime Emmy Awards. Many critics considered the second season Ramsey's standout. Their performance was praised for developing Ellie into a traumatized young adult while maintaining emotional immaturity and playfulness. Radio Times's Louise Griffin lauded Ramsey's chemistry with all of their screen partners.

== Bibliography ==
- Druckmann, Neil; Straley, Bruce (June 2013), The Art of The Last of Us, United States of America: Dark Horse Comics
- Tucker, Ian, ed. (June 2020), The Art of The Last of Us Part II, United States of America: Dark Horse Comics
- Weimin, Toh (2017). "Ellie". In Banks, Jaime; Mejia, Robert; Adams, Aubrie (eds.). 100 Greatest Video Game Characters. Lanham, Maryland: Rowman & Littlefield. pp. 60–62. ISBN 978-1-4422-7813-4.
