= Halley Gross =

American screenwriter (born 1985)

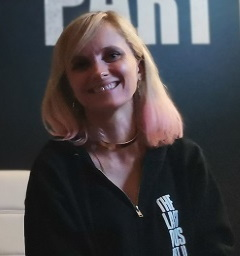
- Gross in September 2019
- Born: December 27, 1985 (age 40); Sanibel, Florida, U.S.
- Education: New York University
- Occupations: Screenwriter; actress
- Years active: 1995–present

Halley Wegryn Gross (born December 27, 1985) is an American screenwriter and actress. She is best known for writing two 2016 episodes of the HBO series Westworld and co-writing the 2020 video game The Last of Us Part II.

== Early life ==
Halley Wegryn Gross was born in Sanibel, Florida, on December 27, 1985, the only child of Heidi Wegryn and David Robert Gross (1935–2014), both attorneys. She grew up in New Jersey, including in New Vernon, and attended Pingry School, graduating in 2004. From the age of 10, she was a child actress who made appearances on Law & Order and later wanted to become a comedian while in college, but found that comedy made her uncomfortable. She attended the Gallatin School of Individualized Study at New York University (NYU) as an undergraduate. She graduated with a degree in creative writing in 2008 and then gained a master's degree in dramaturgy from NYU in 2010.

== Career ==
=== Acting ===
Gross worked as an actress and appeared onstage in a 2005 production of Hurlyburly, a 2011 production of The Metal Children, and a 2012 production of A Midsummer Night's Dream.

=== Writing ===
She had her breakthrough as a writer and story editor for two 2016 episodes of the HBO television series Westworld. She was also a writer for two episodes of the 2019 Amazon miniseries Too Old to Die Young. In 2020, she co-wrote the video game The Last of Us Part II with Neil Druckmann. The game won multiple awards, some of which were awarded to Gross and Druckmann for their writing. The game also broke the record for the most Game of the Year awards received by a single game. Gross joined the writers' room of the second season of the television adaptation of The Last of Us, which adapts part of the events of The Last of Us Part II. She co-wrote the sixth and seventh episodes with Druckmann and Craig Mazin. Gross stepped away from writing duties on the HBO series in July 2025.

== Filmography ==
=== Film ===
Year	Title	Notes
2007	The Babysitters	Nadine Woodberg
2024	Trigger Warning	Rewrote script by John Brancato and Josh Olson

=== Television ===
Year	Title	Episode(s)
2012	Law & Order: Special Victims Unit	"Child's Welfare" (acting role)
2015	Banshee	"Snakes and Whatnot"
2016	Westworld	"The Adversary" and "Trompe L'Oeil"; also story editor
2017	Emerald City	"Everybody Lies"
2019	Too Old to Die Young	"Volume 9: The Empress" and "Volume 10: The World"
2024	Batman: Caped Crusader	"The Stress of Her Regard" and "Nocturne"
2025	The Last of Us	"The Price" and "Convergence" (with Neil Druckmann and Craig Mazin); also co-executive producer

=== Video games ===
Year	Title	Notes
2020	The Last of Us Part II	Co-writer, narrative lead
TBA	Intergalactic: The Heretic Prophet	AJ (acting role)

== Accolades ==
Date	Award / Publication	Category	Work	Result	Ref.
November 24, 2020	Golden Joystick Awards	Best Storytelling	The Last of Us Part II	Won	
December 10, 2020	The Game Awards	Best Narrative	The Last of Us Part II	Won	
December 12, 2020	Titanium Awards	Best Narrative Design	The Last of Us Part II	Won	
December 22, 2020	IGN	Best Video Game Story	The Last of Us Part II	Won	
March 20, 2021	SXSW Gaming Awards	Excellence in Narrative	The Last of Us Part II	Won	
April 8, 2021	D.I.C.E. Awards	Outstanding Achievement in Story	The Last of Us Part II	Won	
July 21, 2021	Game Developers Choice Awards	Best Narrative	The Last of Us Part II	Won	
April 14, 2024	Writers Guild of America Awards	New Series	The Last of Us	Won	
April 14, 2024	Writers Guild of America Awards	Drama Series	The Last of Us	Nominated	
September 7, 2025	Humanitas Prize	Drama Teleplay	The Last of Us	Nominated	
