= Eurydice (Hades) =

Hades character

- Hades character
- Eurydice in Hades
- First appearance: Hades (2020)
- Created by: Greg Kasavin; Darren Korb (music)
- Designed by: Jen Zee
- Voiced by: Fransesca Hogan; Ashley Barrett (singing)

Eurydice is a character in the 2020 video game Hades, based on the mythological figure of the same name from the Greek myth of Orpheus and Eurydice. She is a dryad, lost to the underworld due to Orpheus' failure to adhere Hades' condition involved in returning her from the underworld, leaving them estranged. She is first heard singing the song "Good Riddance", and protagonist Zagreus can effectuate their reunion.

Eurydice was created by creator director Greg Kasavin and designed by Jen Zee, featuring an afro made out of branches on her head. She was voiced by Franscesca Hogan, while her singing was performed by Ashley Barrett, who performed "Good Riddance" and another song called "In the Blood", both composed by composer Darren Korb, who intended the former to be read as being happy with her current situation and happy without Orpheus.

She has been met with "overwhelmingly" positive reception by fans according to author Demetrius Shahmeri, who attributed her popularity to her personality, design, and singing. Her relation to her mythological inspiration has also been analyzed, with Shahmeri arguing that, where Eurydice is a minor Greek figure compared to Orpheus, Eurydice is made more active and significant in this game. Her singing has also been the subject of praise, as have the composition of her songs.

== Concept and creation ==
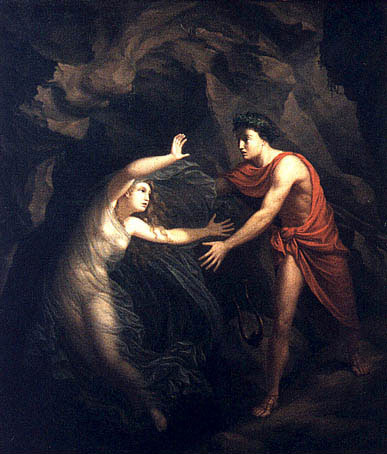
The story of Eurydice and Orpheus in Hades is an adaptation of the Greek mythological tale Orpheus and Eurydice

Eurydice was created by Greg Kasavin, the game's creative director, and her art was created by art director Jen Zee. She is a dryad, based on the Greek mythological figure of the same name. Her story is a retelling of the legend of Orpheus and Eurydice, where Eurydice passed away some time after marrying Orpheus. Orpheus descends to the Greek underworld to meet Hades, at which point he played his melody for him. He was moved to compassion by his performance, allowing him to take Eurydice back to the world of the living under two conditions: she must walk behind him, and he may not turn to look at her until they leave. Orpheus eventually became suspicious that he had been fooled, as he couldn't hear her footsteps. Right before escaping, he looked back, causing her to be trapped in the underworld. Eurydice has tree branches on her head, which she styles into an afro.

Eurydice's song "Good Riddance" was written by Hades composer Darren Korb. Korb consulted with Kasavin about the song's composition, asking him about details such as the subject matter, her point of view, and her feelings towards Orpheus at the time. Korb eventually conceived it as a song that was meant to both convey that she was happy with being in the underworld and happy without Orpheus, comparing it to a breakup song by an artist like Meghan Trainor. He then presented the finished lyrics to Kasavin. Between Eurydice and Orpheus, Korb intended them to have musical styles that matched their personalities; where he wrote Orpheus to have "more of a classical implication or more dramatic or operatic or melodramatic style", Eurydice's was made to have a "more straightforward, simplistic style" that was more accessible and less flowery. This song is sung by both of them, Orpheus' role performed by Korb. The song "In the Blood" is also sung by both of them, was created to feature both of these elements. Eurydice is voiced by Fransesca Hogan, while her singing is performed by Ashley Barrett.

== Appearances ==
Eurydice first appears in the video game Hades in the realm of Asphodel, encountered by protagonist Zagreus on his quest to escape the underworld and from under the thumb of his father, Hades. Contrasting the high-tension setting, Eurydice's chamber has no one to fight, and Eurydice can be heard singing. Over time and multiple meetings, Zagreus learns that she used to be with a man called Orpheus, but became separated after he was unable to free her from the underworld. When he visits her, she will give him various boons. The player can communicate to Orpheus, who is in Hades' throne room, her presence, and can also provide the sheet music to Orpheus of the song Eurydice was singing, which inspires him to sing again. The player can also get them back together, resulting in Orpheus at times appearing in Eurydice's chamber. At the end of the game, they are heard singing together as Zagreus rides the River Styx.

== Reception ==
Eurydice has received generally positive reception, with author Demetrius Shahmeri stating that she was "overwhelmingly" loved by fans of the game and that she often appeared among the top-ranked Hades characters on lists. Shahmeri stated that her "strong personality, "colorful and striking design ... and her music" were among the top reasons why she was so favored. Inverse writer Just Lunning praised the character designs of Hades, stating that every character is "consciously trying their best to be beautiful." They considered Eurydice's design an embodiment of this, particularly the way she forms an afro of tree branches. The Mary Sue writer Briana Lawrence praised the various relationships found in Hades, in particular Eurydice and Orpheus, praising their duet upon being reunited as "beautiful". Vox writer Neel Dhanesha stated that the quest to reunite Eurydice and Orpheus was one that helped him recognize how "special" Hades was as a game. He stated that the first time meeting her broke the rhythm of the game's gameplay loop, and that upon informing Orpheus of her location, he became intent on reuniting them. He stated that living in a pandemic at the time compelled him to "[help] these two characters regain some semblance of the life they once had". He added that he was not surprised that developer Supergiant Games would tell such a story through music, considering it "a tale of beauty and hope found in the midst of pain and death, loss and regret" and stating that he couldn't get t he song out of his head.

The song "Good Riddance" was met with positive reception. RPGFan writer Patrick Gann also praised it, stating "the melodies here are lovely, and the chord progression is deceptively simple" while calling it "beautiful." He enjoyed Korb's falsetto singing voice, stating that it brings depth to the song, adding that he sometimes prefers listening to the "crisp, melodic strains" Barrett provides. He hoped that they would appear in Hades II so that he could hear their singing again. Fellow RPGFan writer Michael Sollosi also praised the duet between them, calling it a highlight of the game. Demetrius Shahmeri praised Barrett's performance, calling her voice "at once soft and powerful, gentle but conveying strength in its ease".

== Analysis ==
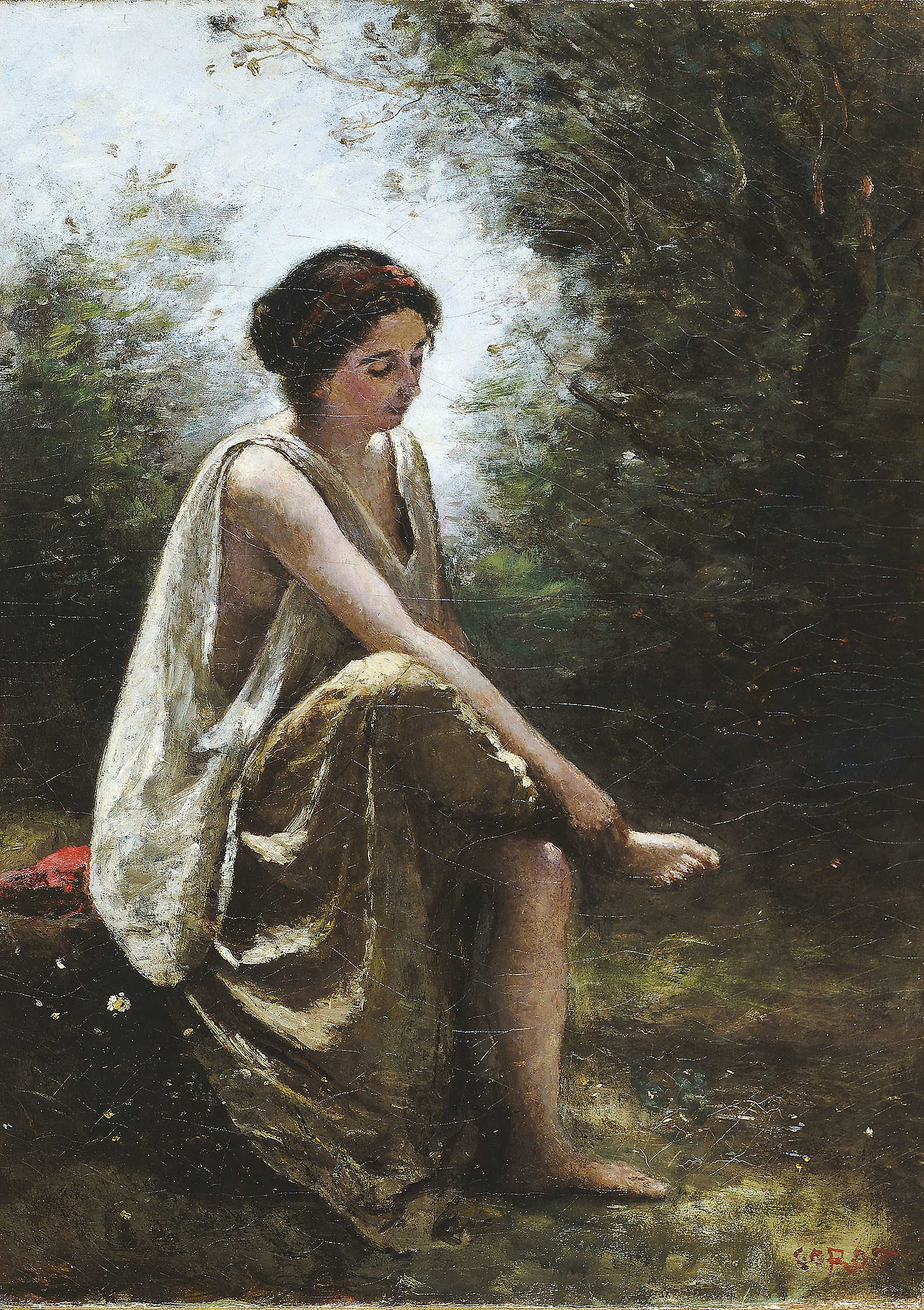
Eurydice is argued by author Demetrius Shahmeri as being an active participant in the narrative of Hades, contrasting her with her inspiration, who he identifies as a minor Greek mythological figure

Eurydice, as well as the songs "The Good Riddance", have been the subject of analysis by game critics and authors. Author Demetrius Shahmeri found the depiction of Eurydice significant due to both the myth itself and how the myth is used in the game to create an Orphic moment by "present[ing] a fundamentally new interpretation of the story that thoughtfully challenges assumptions on gender and voice in video games". Shahmeri argued that, while Eurydice was a minor figure in Greek mythology, she became significant more recently, particularly as a musical symbol, citing Hades' depiction. He believed that Eurydice represented a variance on the trope of women's singing in video games "altering the world through sound". He argued that the decision surrounding Eurydice's role in the game could be attributed to the series' "representational choices", citing how some characters are depicted as non-white, arguing that Eurydice in particular was depicted as a black woman due to her afro-styled branches on her head.

The song "Good Riddance" has been the subject of commentary, particularly its composition and connections to both Eurydice and her mythological inspiration. The Escapist writer Jessica Hoops stated that there was "something magical" with encountering Eurydice for the first time, believing it served as a moment of peace among the chaos otherwise found in Asphodel. She felt that the song served as a greater prize than the in-game rewards for meeting her, arguing that while the song's lyrics express relief over being "freed from earthly burdens", the use of a C minor key signature gave it a "slightly mournful air". She described the theme as being for someone who is "resigned to her fate but wants to convince herself that she's celebrating it".

Demetrius Shahmeri argued that, rather than just disrupting the world of Hades, "Good Riddance" also causes the player to be "subdued and transfigured by the singing voice". He stated that his first encounter with Eurydice "shocking" due to the lack of a threatening presence and metal music he had become accustomed to. Shahmeri added that Zagreus' confusion about the singing mirrored the player's, and that it was not immediately clear whether this was being sung by a character due to there not being any vocal tracks prior to this. By allowing the player to hear her song before she is first scene, Shahmeri argued that this gave her voice a "position of authority", subverting her "traditionally subordinate status". He further argued that Orpheus' music deriving from Eurydice demonstrated her being an "authorial subject" in a more explicit way, contrasting the way Orpheus echoes Eurydice's music with L'Orfeo, a late Renaissance/early Baroque opera, where the character Orpheus is depicted wishing to be echoed himself. contrasted "Good Riddance" with the way music is taken away from the player in Hades and Halo 3 if they spend too long between the action of the game, stating that "Good Riddance" instead encourages the player to sit and listen. He stated that the song also affords the opportunity for the game to surprise the player, including a visit to her chamber, where they discover no music.

The song "In the Blood" received praise from author Daniel Carpenter, who identified it as the signature song of the Hades soundtrack. He described how the acknowledgment that it is being sung by Eurydice and Orpheus inserts itself into the game's diegesis. He argued that this song resembled a "popular music song" instead of a looping video game track due to its pacing and structure, and that it and "Good Riddance"'s use of a semitome can "invoke its connotations of death" as well as create an in-universe musical style for Eurydice and Orpheus. He believed that Korb's falsetto and Barrett's "flowing, expressive vocal delivery" was vocally similar to bands such as Muse and Radiohead, including "Citizen Erased" and "No Surprises" respectively. Carpenter argued that, rather than the "timbral opposition" in Hades' main theme, "In the Blood" focuses on unity, citing "close vocal harmonies", believing this to be an intentional decision to represent the reunion of Eurydice and Orpheus. Author Silvia Mantilla-Wright commented that Eurydice and Orpheus represented a"pseudo-Greek chorus", stating that they serve as observers of the narrative as it progresses, and that "In the Blood" serves as their commentary on the narrative themes of the game.
