= Rickety Stitch and the Gelatinous Goo =

Rickety Stitch and the Gelatinous Goo is a young adult and middle grade fantasy, graphic novel series. The series includes Rickety Stitch Book 1: The Road to Epoli, Rickety Stitch Book 2: The Middle-Route Run and Rickety Stitch Book 3: Battle Of The Bards.

== Overview ==
The novel consists of a series of books featuring a skeleton named Rickety Stitch and his friend Goo, who go through challenges and adventures while trying to discover the origins of Stitch. The only clue he has about his past is a song, which he hears in his dreams.

Its creators are Ben Costa and James Parks. The books are published by Knopf Books for Young Readers, Random House and Random House Graphic (North America), Keter Books (Israel) and AST (Russia). They are included in the Junior Library Guild.

=== Main characters ===
- Rickety Stitch
- Gelatinous Goo
- "Ziggy" Zigglidorglmorkin
- L. Nerman Fuddle

=== Music ===
Rickety Stitch has music accompanying the release of every book in the series. The music is arranged by folk musician Evin Wolverton and Supergiant Games composer Darren Korb (known for his work on the games Bastion, Transistor, Pyre and Hades).

== Reception ==
Some reviews were received from: Publishers Weekly, Kirkus Reviews, School Library Journal and The Bulletin of the Center for Children's Books.

== Nominations and awards ==
- Junior Library Guild Selection: Rickety Stitch and the Gelatinous Goo Book 1: The Road to Epoli and Rickety stitch and the Gelatinous Goo Book 2: The Middle-Route Run
- YALSA 2018 Quick Pick for Reluctant Readers Nominee
- Texas Library Association Mavericks Graphic Novels Reading List
- Cybils Award 2018 Graphic Novels Nominee: Rickety stitch and the Gelatinous Goo Book 2: The Middle-Route Run
- 2019 Dinky Awards Nominee, Best Work for Young Readers Award: Rickety Stitch and the Gelatinous Goo, Book 2: The Middle-Route Run
