= Logan Cunningham (actor) =

American actor

- Occupation: Actor
- Years active: 2008–present

Logan Cunningham is an American actor. He is best known for his voice roles in video games developed and published by American independent video game development studio Supergiant Games. Cunningham's voice over work in video game titles has received recognition from the video game industry. He was conferred the Performer in a Supporting Role BAFTA Award in 2021 for his work as multiple characters in the roguelike video game Hades.

== Career ==
The 2011 title Bastion is Logan Cunningham's first acting project in the video game industry. He agreed to participate in the project as a personal favor for his friends. As the principal voice actor of Bastion, Cunningham worked closely with the game's audio director Darren Korb and recorded his lines as the game's narrator from a small closet within an apartment in New York. Bastion's critical and commercial success allowed Cunningham the opportunity to resign from his job at a movie theater to undertake full-time work as an actor. Cunningham hosted the inaugural New York Game Awards at the Cantor Film Center in 2012.

Cunningham would continue his role as the principal voice actor of subsequent titles developed and published by Supergiant Games, sometimes voicing multiple characters as in 2017's Pyre and 2020's Hades. Cunningham plays six different named roles in Hades: Lord Hades, Poseidon, Achilles, Charon, Asterius, and The Storyteller. Cunningham also voiced the game's patch notes during its early access developmental period.

Cunningham has received critical acclaim for his video game voice acting work, which has been described by critics like Eurogamer staff and Jordan Devore from Destructoid as an essential element that positively impacted the critical success enjoyed by Supergiant Games' titles. Notable accolades received by Cunningham include the Lead Performance in a Comedy NAVGTR Award in 2012 for his role in Bastion, as well as the Performer in a Supporting Role at the 2021 BAFTA Games Awards for his roles in Hades. In May 2021, Cunningham was the subject of a webinar event titled "Games Performance Masterclass" hosted by BAFTA.

== Personal life ==
Cunningham grew up in the Bay Area and San Jose in the state of California. Cunningham is a childhood friend of Amir Rao, the co-founder of Supergiant Games. They met each other through youth soccer events. Cunningham later attended a high school which has a well developed theater program, where he became acquainted with Darren Korb. Cunningham, Korb and Rao all moved to New York for their college education; Cunningham in particular attended the Lincoln Center campus of Fordham University.

== Works ==
=== Video games ===
Year	Title	Role	Ref(s)
2011	Bastion	The Narrator, Rucks	
2012	Resonance	Winston Bennet (voice)	
2012	Primordia	Horatio Nullbuilt	
2013	Dota 2	Bastion (announcer pack)	
2013	Codename Cygnus	Neptune	
2014	Transistor	The Transistor	
2017	Pyre	The Voice, Lendel, Dalbert, Bertrude, Ignarius	
2018	Unavowed	Logan Brown	
2020	Hades	Lord Hades, Poseidon, Achilles, Charon, Asterius, and Homer the Storyteller	
2025	Hades II	Hades, Poseidon, Charon, Polyphemus, Chronos, and Homer the Storyteller	

=== Film ===
Year	Title	Role	Notes	Ref(s)
2008	Between Something & Nothing	Alex		
2009	Palace Hotel	The Sailor	Short film	
2011	Ouija Tape	Scientist 2	Short film	
2012	Edna	Jerry	Short film, voice role	
2015	Jackrabbit	Tom		
2019	Good News	Andrew	Short film	
2021	Trooper	Radio Interviewee	Short film, voice role	

=== Television ===
Year	Title	Role	Notes	Ref(s)
2016	Adultish	Dillon	TV series, 3 episodes	

== Accolades ==
Year	Work	Award	Category	Result	Ref.
2012	Bastion	NAVGTR Awards	Performance in a Comedy, Lead	Won	
2015	Transistor	BAFTA Games Award	Best Performer	Nominated	
2020	Hades	The Game Awards 2020	Best Performance	Nominated	
2021	Hades	BAFTA Games Awards	Performer in a Supporting Role	Won	
