= 24th Annual D.I.C.E. Awards =

Video game award ceremony

- Date: April 22, 2021
- Hosted by: Jessica Chobot, Greg Miller, and Kahleif Adams

Highlights
- Most awards: Hades (5)
- Most nominations: The Last of Us Part II (11)
- Game of the Year: Hades

The 24th Annual D.I.C.E. Awards was the 24th edition of the D.I.C.E. Awards ("Design Innovate Communicate Entertain"), an annual awards event that honored the best games in the video game industry during 2020. The awards were arranged by the Academy of Interactive Arts & Sciences (AIAS), and were held on April 22, 2021. Due to the COVID-19 pandemic, the event was held virtually. Winners of the D.I.C.E. Awards were determined by ballot of industry experts and AIAS members. The show was hosted by Greg Miller, Jessica Chobot, and Kahlief Adams. The nominees were announced on January 26, 2021. The awards event was originally scheduled for April 8.

The award for Portable Game of the Year was replaced with Mobile Game of the Year. This was also the first year without any winners for the Academy's Special Awards.

The Last of Us Part II and its developer Naughty Dog received the most nominations, and Hades and its developer Supergiant Games won the most awards, including Game of the Year. Ghost of Tsushima and its developer Sucker Punch Productions came in second in both receiving the most nominations and awards won. Sony Interactive Entertainment was the most nominated and award-winning publisher, as well as publishing the most nominated and award-winning games.

== Winners and nominees ==
Winners are listed first, highlighted in boldface, and indicated with a double dagger (‡).

=== Game of the Year awards ===
**Game of the Year**: **Hades (Supergiant Games) — Amir Rao, Gavin Simon, Greg Kasavin, Jen Zee, Darren Korb, Andrew Wang**‡; Animal Crossing: New Horizons (Nintendo EPD) — Hisashi Nogami, Aya Kyogoku; Final Fantasy VII Remake (Square Enix) — Yoshinori Kitase, Tetsuya Nomura, Naoki Hamaguchi; Ghost of Tsushima (Sucker Punch Productions, Sony Interactive Entertainment) — Brian Fleming, Chris Zimmerman; The Last of Us Part II (Naughty Dog, Sony Interactive Entertainment) — Evan Wells, Neil Druckmann, Anthony Newman, Kurt Margenau	**Online Game of the Year**: **Fall Guys: Ultimate Knockout (Mediatonic, Devolver Digital) — Joel Herber**‡; Animal Crossing: New Horizons (Nintendo EPD) — Aya Kyogoku, Kenichi Nishida; Call of Duty: Black Ops Cold War (Treyarch, Activision); Ghost of Tsushima (Sucker Punch Productions, Sony Interactive Entertainment) — Darren Bridges, Matt Goldhaber; Tetris Effect: Connected (Monstars Inc., Resonair, Stage Game, Enhance) — Tomohiro Tatejima, Atsushi Kusunose, Chuk Tang, Tomohiro Tatejima
**Mobile Game of the Year**: **Legends of Runeterra (Riot Games) — Jeff Jew, Andrew Yip**‡; HoloVista (Aconite) — Meredith Hall, Star St Germain, Nadya Lev; Little Orpheus (The Chinese Room, Sumo Digital) — Alex Girling, Dan Pinchbeck, Matt Duff, Rob McLachlan; Song of Bloom (Kamibox) — Philipp Stollenmayer; South of the Circle (State of Play, Apple, Inc.) — John Lau, Luke Whittaker, Katherine Bidwell	**Outstanding Achievement for an Independent Game**: **Hades (Supergiant Games) — Amir Rao, Gavin Simon, Greg Kasavin, Jen Zee, Darren Korb, Andrew Wang**‡; Coffee Talk (Toge Productions, Chorus Games Worldwide) — Andrew Jeremy, Kris Antoni Hadiputra, Mohammad Fahmi; If Found... (Dreamfeel, Annapurna Interactive) — Eve Golden-Woods, Llaura McGee; Kentucky Route Zero: TV Edition (Cardboard Computer, Annapurna Interactive) — Ben Babbitt, Jake Elliott, Tamas Kemenczy; Noita (Nolla Games) — Petri Purho, Olli Harjola, Arvi Teikari

=== Immersive Reality awards ===
**Immersive Reality Game of the Year**: **Half-Life: Alyx (Valve)**‡; Down the Rabbit Hole (Cortopia Studios) — Ricky Helgesson, Ryan Bednar; Paper Beast (Pixel Reef, Plug In Studios) — Eric Chahi; The Room VR: A Dark Matter (Fireproof Games) — Tom Seed, Mark Hamilton, Rob Dodd; The Walking Dead: Saints & Sinners (Skydance Interactive) — Adam Grantham, Todd Adamson, Jason Bare	**Immersive Reality Technical Achievement**: **Half-Life: Alyx (Valve)**‡; Mario Kart Live: Home Circuit (Valen Studios, Nintendo) — Yosuke Tamori, Hiroshi Matsunaga, Nicholas Ruepp, Dan Doptis; Museum of Other Realities (MOR Museum, Inc.) — Colin Northway, Robin Stethem, Lindsay Jorgensen, Stephen Gray, Adam Madojemu, Adiba Muzaffar; Paper Beast (Pixel Reef, Plug In Studios) — Eric Chahi, François Sahy, Sebastien Cardona, Olivier Fouques; The Under Presents - Tempest (Tender Claws Studio) — Danny Cannizzaro, Samantha Gorman

=== Craft awards ===
**Outstanding Achievement in Game Direction**: **Hades (Supergiant Games) — Amir Rao, Gavin Simon, Greg Kasavin, Jen Zee, Darren Korb, Andrew Wang**‡; Ghost of Tsushima (Sucker Punch Productions, Sony Interactive Entertainment) — Nate Fox, Jason Connell; Half-Life: Alyx (Valve); Kentucky Route Zero: TV Edition (Cardboard Computer, Annapurna Interactive) — Ben Babbitt, Jake Eliott, Tamas Kemenczy; The Last of Us Part II (Naughty Dog, Sony Interactive Entertainment) — Neil Druckmann, Anthony Newman, Kurt Margenau	**Outstanding Achievement in Game Design**: **Hades (Supergiant Games) — Amir Rao, Gavin Simon, Greg Kasavin, Alice Lai, Eduardo Gorinstein**‡; Ghost of Tsushima (Sucker Punch Productions, Sony Interactive Entertainment) — Chris Zimmerman, Jeff McGann, Parker Hamilton; Half-Life: Alyx (Valve); The Last of Us Part II (Naughty Dog, Sony Interactive Entertainment) — Emilia Schatz, Richard Cambier, Matthew Gallant; Marvel's Spider-Man: Miles Morales (Insomniac Games, Sony Interactive Entertainment) — Cameron Christian
**Outstanding Achievement in Animation**: **The Last of Us Part II (Naughty Dog, Sony Interactive Entertainment) — Jeremy Yates, Almudena Soria Sancho, Eric Baldwin**‡; Final Fantasy VII Remake (Square Enix) — Yoshiyuki Soma, Akira Iwasawa, Ryo Hara; Marvel's Spider-Man: Miles Morales (Insomniac Games, Sony Interactive Entertainment) — Danny Garnett, Brian Wyser, Mike Yosh; Ori and the Will of the Wisps (Moon Studios, Xbox Game Studios) — Warren Goff, Jim Donovan, Boris Hiestand; Spiritfarer (Thunder Lotus Games) — Alexandre Boyer	**Outstanding Achievement in Art Direction**: **Ghost of Tsushima (Sucker Punch Productions, Sony Interactive Entertainment) — Jason Connell**‡; Hades (Supergiant Games) — Jen Zee; The Last of Us Part II (Naughty Dog, Sony Interactive Entertainment) — Erick Pangilinan, John Sweeney; Marvel's Spider-Man: Miles Morales (Insomniac Games, Sony Interactive Entertainment) — Jason Hickey, Gavin Goulden; Ori and the Will of the Wisps (Moon Studios, Xbox Game Studios) — Jeremy Grifton, Daniel van Leeuwen, Mikhail Rakhmatullin
**Outstanding Achievement in Character**: **Miles Morales, Marvel's Spider-Man: Miles Morales (Insomniac Games, Sony Interactive Entertainment) — Portrayed by Nadji Jeter; written by Ben Arfmann, Jon Paquette, Mary Kenney, Max Folkman, and Evan Narcisse**‡; Eivor Varinsdottir, Assassin's Creed Valhalla (Ubisoft Montreal) — Portrayed by Magnus Bruun and Cecilie Stenspil; written by Darby McDevitt; Zagreus, Hades (Supergiant Games) — Portrayed by Darren Korb; written by Greg Kasavin; Abby, The Last of Us Part II (Naughty Dog, Sony Interactive Entertainment) — Portrayed by Laura Bailey; written by Neil Druckmann, Halley Gross, Josh Scherr, and Ryan James; Ellie, The Last of Us Part II (Naughty Dog, Sony Interactive Entertainment) — Portrayed by Ashley Johnson; written by Neil Druckmann, Halley Gross, Josh Scherr, and Ryan James	**Outstanding Achievement in Original Music Composition**: **Ghost of Tsushima (Sucker Punch Productions, Sony Interactive Entertainment) — Ilan Eshkeri, Shigeru Umebayashi, Peter Scaturro**‡; Carrion (Phobia Game Studio, Devolver Digital) — Cris Velasco; Little Orpheus (The Chinese Room, Sumo Digital) — Jim Fowler, Jessica Curry; Ori and the Will of the Wisps (Moon Studios, Xbox Game Studios) — Gareth Coker; The Pathless (Giant Squid, Annapurna Interactive) — Austin Wintory
**Outstanding Achievement in Audio Design**: **Ghost of Tsushima (Sucker Punch Productions, Sony Interactive Entertainment) — Rev. Dr. Bradley D. Meyer**‡; Dreams (Media Molecule, Sony Interactive Entertainment) — Ed Hargrave, Tom Colvin; The Last of Us Part II (Naughty Dog, Sony Interactive Entertainment) — Rob Krekel, Beau Jimenez, Neil Uchitel, Justin Mullens, Jesse Garcia; Ori and the Will of the Wisps (Moon Studios, Xbox Game Studios) — Kristoffer Larson, Guy Whitmore, Alexander Leeman Johnson; Sackboy: A Big Adventure (Sumo Digital, Sony Interactive Entertainment) — Jay Waters, Jey Kazi, James Marshal	**Outstanding Achievement in Story**: **The Last of Us Part II (Naughty Dog, Sony Interactive Entertainment) — Neil Druckmann, Halley Gross, Josh Scherr, Ryan James**‡; 13 Sentinels: Aegis Rim (Vanillaware, Sega) — George Kamitani; Ghost of Tsushima (Sucker Punch Productions, Sony Interactive Entertainment) — Ian Ryan, Patrick Downs, Nate Fox; Hades (Supergiant Games) — Greg Kasavin; Kentucky Route Zero: TV Edition (Cardboard Computer, Annapurna Interactive) — Jake Elliott
**Outstanding Technical Achievement**: **Dreams (Media Molecule, Sony Interactive Entertainment) — David Smith, Liam DeValmency, Alex Evans**‡; Ghost of Tsushima (Sucker Punch Productions, Sony Interactive Entertainment) — Chris Zimmerman, Adrian Bentley, Jasmin Patry; The Last of Us Part II (Naughty Dog, Sony Interactive Entertainment) — Sandeep Shekar, Vincent Marxen, Jason Gregory, Christian Gyrling, Travis McIntosh; Mario Kart Live: Home Circuit (Valen Studios, Nintendo) — Jan-Erik Steel, Ed Tumbusch, Kart & Gate Development Team, SDK Development Team, Nintendo European Research & Development; Microsoft Flight Simulator (Asobo Studio, Xbox Game Studios) — Jorg Neuman, Sebastian Wloch, Damien Cuzacq, Sebastien Ricolfi, Alain Guyet, Lionel Fuentes

=== Genre awards ===
**Action Game of the Year**: **Hades (Supergiant Games) — Amir Rao, Gavin Simon, Greg Kasavin, Jen Zee, Darren Korb, Andrew Wang**‡; Doom Eternal (id Software, Bethesda Softworks); Half-Life: Alyx (Valve); Marvel's Spider-Man: Miles Morales (Insomniac Games, Sony Interactive Entertainment) — Ted Price, Brian Horton, Cameron Christian; Nioh 2 (Team Ninja, Sony Interactive Entertainment) — Kohei Shibata, Fumihiko Yasuda	**Adventure Game of the Year**: **Ghost of Tsushima (Sucker Punch Productions, Sony Interactive Entertainment) — Brian Fleming, Chris Zimmerman**‡; Assassin's Creed Valhalla (Ubisoft Montreal) — Julien Lafferiere, Eric Baptizat; Kentucky Route Zero: TV Edition (Cardboard Computer, Annapurna Interactive) — Ben Babbitt, Jake Elliott, Tamas Kemenczy; The Last of Us Part II (Naughty Dog, Sony Interactive Entertainment) — Evan Wells, Neil Druckmann, Anthony Newman, Kurt Margenau; Ori and the Will of the Wisps (Moon Studios, Xbox Game Studios) — Thomas Mahler, Gennadiy Korol
**Family Game of the Year**: **Animal Crossing: New Horizons (Nintendo EPD) — Hisashi Nogami, Aya Kyogoku**‡; Astro's Playroom (Team Asobi, Sony Interactive Entertainment) — Nicolas Doucet; Dreams (Media Molecule, Sony Interactive Entertainment) — Siobhan Reddy, Mark Healey, Kareem Ettouney; Fall Guys: Ultimate Knockout (Mediatonic, Devolver Digital) — Alexandru Ruse, Jeff Tanton, Joseph Walsh; Sackboy: A Big Adventure (Sumo Digital, Sony Interactive Entertainment) — Gary Moore, Ned Waterhouse, Tom O'Connor	**Fighting Game of the Year**: **Mortal Kombat 11: Ultimate (NetherRealm Studios, Warner Bros. Interactive Entertainment) — Ed Boon, Shaun Himmerick**‡; EA Sports UFC 4 (EA Vancouver) — Nate McDonald, Brian Hayes, Sean Ramjagsingh; Granblue Fantasy Versus (Cygames, Arc System Works, XSEED Games, Marvelous) — Yuito Kimura, Tetsuya Fukuhara; Them's Fightin' Herds (Mane6, Maximum Games, Humble Games) — Aaron Stavely, Lauren Faust, Omari Smith
**Racing Game of the Year**: **Mario Kart Live: Home Circuit (Valen Studios, Nintendo) — Yosuke Tamori, Hiroshi Matsunaga, Nicholas Ruepp, Dan Doptis**‡; Dirt 5 (Codemasters) — Robert Karp, David Springate, Amrish Wadekar, Stuart Boyd, Gaz Wainwright; F1 2020 (Codemasters) — Ian Flatt, Lee Mather, Mike Tebbut, Paul Jeal	**Role-Playing Game of the Year**: **Final Fantasy VII Remake (Square Enix) — Yoshinori Kitase, Tetsuya Nomura, Naoki Hamaguchi**‡; Cyberpunk 2077 (CD Projekt Red) — Adam Badowski, Konrad Tomaszkiewicz, Grzegorz Mocarski, Mateusz Kanik, Jedrzej Mroz, Michal Stec, Przemyslaw Wojcik; Persona 5 Royal (Atlus, Sega) — Kazuhisa Wada, Daiki Itoh; Wasteland 3 (inXile Entertainment, Deep Silver) — Jeff Pellegrin, Aaron Meyers, Tim Campbell; Yakuza: Like a Dragon (Ryu Ga Gotoku Studio, Sega) — Hiroyuki Sakamoto, Daisuke Sato, Masayoshi Yokoyama, Toshihiro Nagoshi, Ryosuke Horii
**Sports Game of the Year**: **Tony Hawk's Pro Skater 1 + 2 (Vicarious Visions, Activision) — Barry Morales, Brent Gibson, Chris Wilson**‡; FIFA 21 (EA Vancouver, EA Romania) — Tom Pan, Tenille Dang, Mat Prior, Adam Shaikh, Aaron McHardy, John Shepherd; MLB The Show 20 (SIE San Diego Studio) — Chris Cutliff, Nick Livingston, Jason Villa; NBA 2K21 (Visual Concepts, 2K Games) — Erick Boenisch, Jeffrey J. Thomas, Gabriel Abarcar, Mike Wang; PGA Tour 2K21 (HB Studios, 2K Games) — Josh Muise, Shaun West	**Strategy/Simulation Game of the Year**: **Microsoft Flight Simulator (Asobo Studio, Xbox Game Studios) — Jorg Neuman, Sebastian Wloch, Martial Bossard, David Dedeine, Damien Cuzacq**‡; Crusader Kings III (Paradox Development Studio, Paradox Interactive) — Henrik Fåhraeus; Desperados III (Mimimi Games, THQ Nordic) — Moritz Wagner, Frieder Mielke, Bianca Dörr, Tom Kersten, Dominik Abé; Monster Train (Shiny Shoe, Good Shepherd Entertainment) — Mark Cooke, Andrew Krausnick, Yujin Kiem; Per Aspera (Tlön Industries, Raw Fury) — Damian Hernaez, Roque Rey, Javier Otaegui

=== Multiple nominations and awards ===
==== Multiple nominations ====
Games that received multiple nominations
Nominations	Game
11	The Last of Us Part II
10	Ghost of Tsushima
8	Hades
5	Half-Life: Alyx
5	Marvel's Spider-Man: Miles Morales
5	Ori and the Will of the Wisps
4	Kentucky Route Zero: TV Edition
3	Animal Crossing: New Horizons
3	Dreams
3	Final Fantasy VII Remake
3	Mario Kart Live: Home Circuit
2	Assassin's Creed Valhalla
2	Fall Guys: Ultimate Knockout
2	Little Orpheus
2	Microsoft Flight Simulator
2	Paper Beast
2	Sackboy: A Big Adventure

Nominations by company
Nominations	Games	Company
34	8	Sony Interactive Entertainment
11	1	Naughty Dog
10	1	Sucker Punch Productions
8	1	Supergiant Games
7	2	Xbox Game Studios
6	3	Annapurna Interactive
6	2	Nintendo
5	1	Insomniac Games
5	1	Moon Studios
5	1	Valve
4	2	Sumo Digital
4	1	Cardboard Computer
3	3	Sega
3	2	Devolver Digital
3	1	Media Molecule
3	1	Square Enix
3	1	Valen Studios
2	2	2K Games
2	2	Activision
2	2	Codemasters
2	2	Electronic Arts
2	1	Asobo Studio
2	1	Mediatonic
2	1	Pixel Reef
2	1	Plug In Studios
2	1	The Chinese Room
2	1	Ubisoft Montreal

==== Multiple awards ====
Games that received multiple awards
Awards	Game
5	Hades
4	Ghost of Tsushima
2	Half-Life: Alyx
2	The Last of Us Part II

Awards by company
Awards	Games	Company
8	4	Sony Interactive Entertainment
5	1	Supergiant Games
4	1	Sucker Punch Productions
2	2	Nintendo
2	1	Naughty Dog
2	1	Valve
