= Jen Zee =

American artist and game developer

- Occupation: Artist
- Known for: Art director for Supergiant Games

Jen Zee is an American artist and the art director for Supergiant Games. She joined Supergiant Games in March 2010 as a contractor on Bastion and was quickly brought on as the full time art director for the company. Her art has received positive accolades from critics, and for her work on Hades she received numerous awards, including the 2021 BAFTA Games Award for Artistic Achievement. and nominations at the D.I.C.E. Awards. Jen Zee is known for her vibrant use of color and distinctive art style, which has been widely praised across her projects, including Bastion, Transistor, Pyre, and Hades. She continued her role as art director for Hades II.

== Career ==
=== Early work at Supergiant Games ===
Zee was inspired to become an artist by Tetsuya Nomura's character art for Final Fantasy VII at an early age. Before moving to work at Supergiant Games, Zee worked for Gaia Online in her first job and made isometric environmental designs. She joined Supergiant in March 2010 as the company's third employee, initially as a temporary contractor, to work on Supergiant's first game, Bastion. After seeing Zee's work where she drew "The Bastion" for the game, the two co-founders at Supergiant immediately asked her to join the project full time. Zee later called it "serendipitous" as she was considering a career change anyways, and took the position as Supergiant's art director. Her artwork for Bastion often went straight into the game, and she later described the work as "super empowering" because of the ownership she was given. Reviews for Bastion repeatedly praised the game's striking visuals. Game Rant's Andrew Dyce said, "The hand-painted artwork of Jen Zee certainly doesn't disappoint, breathing into the game a style that may immediately conjure up images of a childhood fairy tale."

Zee described her work on Supergiant's next game, Transistor, as a love-letter to William Waterhouse, Gustav Klimt and other classical work, while intentionally eschewing Cyberpunk aesthetics despite the game's futuristic setting. Her work on designing the main character Red took time and coordination with the story team, with Zee landing on having Red's companion be a sentient sword. Again, critical reception praised the game's visuals. The Mary Sue's Becky Chambers singled out Zee along with game's composer Darren Korb, saying, "Art director Jen Zee and composer Darren Korb deserve heaps of praise for the world they conjured here."

For Supergiant's third game, Pyre, Zee noted that she was inspired by pen-and-ink artists while developing the game, but was not able to incorporate that style into the design. Zee noted that the team was "sick of doing worlds where there was only one person" in discussing the inspiration for her work on the game. Reviews again reacted positively to Pyre's art, and in an article for Gamasutra, Cherish Socro called Zee "one of the major stars of the company" when describing Pyre.

=== Hades and Hades II ===
Hades, Supergiant's fourth game, is an action roguelike set in Greek mythology with the main character Zagreus attempting to flee the Underworld. For the game, Zee said she was inspired by the work of comics artist Mike Mignola and Fred Taylor, a 19th-century poster artist. With a larger team than she had previously managed on earlier games, Zee oversaw the artistic concept for the game, along with its character and environmental designs, while members of her team handled other pieces. They originally made the game with a painterly aesthetic, but changed to a pen-and-ink look after the narrative changed in post-production. The Guardian's Keza MacDonald noted that "social media has gone mad" for Zee's character portraits, which she described as "beautiful." Game Designer Greg Kasavin said that the reason the characters in the game were so attractive in the game was "Because Jen Zee" and credited Zee's respect for the classical tradition as being key to honoring the source material and the expression of Zee as an artist.

Zee has been nominated for and received numerous accolades for her work on the game. Zee received the 2021 BAFTA Games Award for Artistic Achievement for the work of her and her art team. At the 24th Annual D.I.C.E. Awards, Zee was nominated for "Outstanding Achievement in Art Direction", and received awards in four other categories where she was specifically credited as part of the larger development team, including for "Game of the Year".

Zee remained art director for the game's sequel Hades II, which was released into early access in May 2024.
