= Darren Korb =

American songwriter and composer (born 1983)

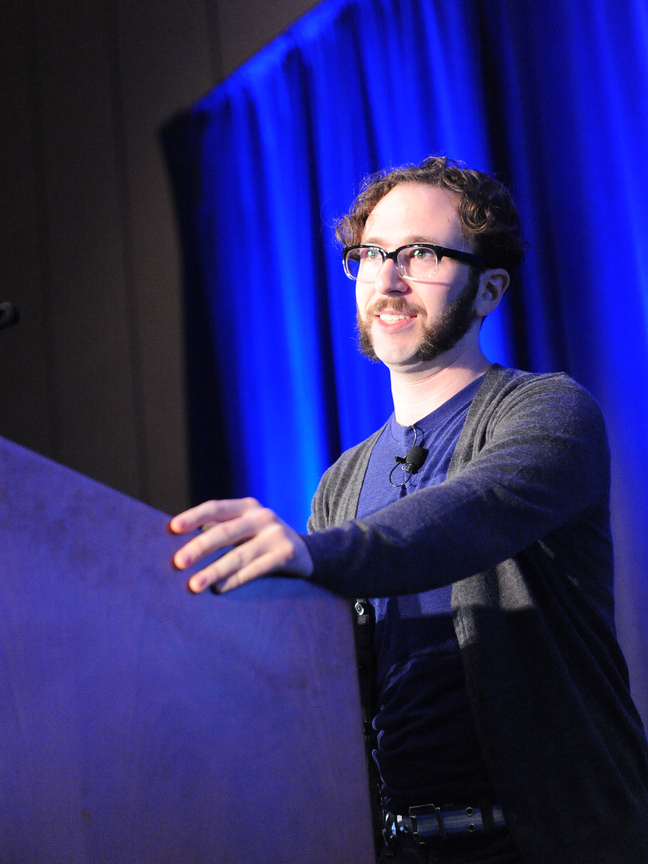
- Korb in 2012

Background information
- Born: November 5, 1983 (age 42); San Jose, California, U.S.
- Occupations: Songwriter, composer, voice actor
- Instruments: Bass, keys, drums, guitar, harp, accordion, mandolin
- Years active: 2011–present

Darren Korb (born November 5, 1983) is an American songwriter, composer, and voice actor. Korb is best known for writing the music featured in Bastion, Transistor, Pyre, Hades, and Hades II, all of which were developed by indie developer Supergiant Games. Korb also voice-acted in the latter two games, providing the voice for Zagreus.

== Early life and career ==
Korb participated in musical theater from the age of five and continued into and through high school. While attending high school at Bellarmine College Preparatory in San Jose, California, Korb met his longtime friend and collaborator Logan Cunningham. During his childhood, Korb also befriended Ashley Barrett, who would become a frequent collaborator of his on the soundtracks for Supergiant's releases.

Korb went to New York University for music production and music business. Prior to his work with Supergiant Games, he worked on minor television and film projects. He has played bass and keyboard for the New York-based power pop and punk band Audio Fiction. Later, Korb co-founded the indie band Control Group; when not working on Supergiant-related works, Korb plays with them.

== Work with Supergiant Games ==
Korb serves as the audio director and composer of Supergiant Games, an indie video game developer. A childhood friend of the studio's co-founder Amir Rao, Korb was selected to write the music for Bastion, the developer's first game. As audio director, Korb records the voice talent, sometimes while accompanied by Greg Kasavin, the creative director of Supergiant's games.

Korb's scoring on the soundtracks for Supergiant's games have received critical acclaim, with many writers having called his soundtracks some of the best, particularly among indie games. Korb's compositions have appeared on various all-time and annual listings of best soundtrack albums. (Note: Such listings include: GameSpot's "Best Video Game Soundtracks" list (Bastion).; GamesRadar+'s "25 best video game soundtracks of all time" list (Transistor at 8th).; IGN's "Best Video Game Soundtrack / Score of 2020" list (Hades).; Kotaku's Best Video Game Music of 2011, 2014, and 2017 lists (Bastion, Transistor, and Pyre, respectively).; The Mary Sue's "Best Video Game Soundtracks of All Time" ranking (Transistor and Hades at 8th and 9th, respectively).; PCMag's "25 Best Video Game Soundtracks Ever" list (Bastion).) Kotaku's Ari Notis wrote that "the music is always a character" in Supergiant's games.

=== Bastion (2011) ===
After signing on to work on Bastion, Korb was tasked with all of the game's audio, including its music, sound effects, and voiceover recordings. In regards to the latter, Korb asked Cunningham, at this point his roommate, if he would be interested in the lead voice role. Accepting the role, Korb would set up a microphone in a closet, where Cunningham would record his lines. Korb stated that his work on Bastion's sound design was a "trial by fire", as it was the area of the game's audio production he had the least experience with.

Korb described the music on Bastion as "acoustic frontier trip-hop", combining "heavily sampled beats in layers, along with acoustic elements". On Bastion, a long-time friend of Korb's, Ashley Barrett, provided the voice of Zia, as well as the vocals on the soundtrack. Budget and expertise played a role in Korb's approach to the game's music. These constraints helped originate the acoustic nature of Bastion's soundtrack; he explained in an interview with Spin that "all of the music that I made had to be stuff that I could make in my apartment. I couldn't really have other musicians, I couldn't record acoustic drums, so I had an acoustic guitar and these samples that I could use." Korb has stated that Supergiant conceived Bastion as a "frontier-sy fantasy thing, like what if Cormac McCarthy made a fantasy video game?" With this concept in mind, Korb went for a "sort of down-tuned open guitar — a bluesy guitar" sound.

The music of Bastion was well received; Matt Cox of Rock Paper Shotgun called Korb a "wizard", writing "the way Bastion marries its music to its story is spellbinding." Tom Phillips of Eurogamer stated, "the game's musical score and innovative narration are stand-out elements." In a retrospective discussing Bastion as one of the best games of the 2010s, Malindy Hetfeld of Eurogamer praised Korb's soundtrack as "fantastic".

Additionally, Bastion won the Spike Video Game Awards for Best Original Score and Best Song in a Game for "Build That Wall (Zia's Theme)". A physical CD version of the soundtrack was released on September 2, 2011. The soundtrack would go on to sell 30,000 copies by November 2011. Rapper Ab-Soul sampled "The Bottom Feeders" off of the Bastion soundtrack on his song "Terrorist Threats".

=== Transistor (2014) ===
After the success of Bastion, Korb composed for Supergiant's second game Transistor. Korb stated that he struggled trying to replicate his approach to aim for a specific genre as he did with Bastion. However, Korb ultimately described the genre of Transistor's soundtrack as "Old-world electronic post-rock". Korb stated that he and his team, "spent a lot of time prototyping the art and audio to make sure that they were 'of a piece' this time. That was one of our goals. Bastion, I thought, turned out really nicely, but a goal on this project was to more seamlessly integrate the look and feel of the art with the feel of the audio." Some of the music on soundtrack was composed to create feelings of tension; Korb stated:

One thing I like to do for building tension is to have rhythmic elements that fight a bit. In 'Gateless', for example, the piece is in five but the bass line for the B section is in three, so it ends up feeling really tense. I also tend to use a lot of chords with close intervals for tension building as well.

GameSpot noted that Korb used "dissonant chords in the upper range to create unease".

On the instruments used in Transistor, Korb stated that "there is a lot of heavily delayed electric guitar and sampled drums, but I also tried to include a number of 'old-world' instruments: accordion, harp, mandolin, etc.". Korb worked with Barrett once again on Transistor, as she voiced Red, the game's protagonist. On their collaboration, Korb stated, "after working with Ashley on a couple projects now, I feel like I've gotten a better sense of how to write for her voice. For me, that's the main consideration that affects my writing process. Our sessions are pretty laid back. If a melody line doesn't feel quite right in her voice we will change it on the fly."

Like Bastion, Transistor's music received positive reception; Tasos Lazarides of TouchArcade wrote "Darren Korb's music is astounding, rich and evocative as it echoes across the game and perfectly complements the bright yet mysterious world of Transistor". Additionally, the music in Transistor earned several industry awards nominations. The soundtrack album was released simultaneously with the game, on May 20, 2014, selling 48,000 copies in its first 10 days of release.

=== Pyre (2017) ===
Korb served as the composer for the 2017 Supergiant release Pyre. Video game critics praised Korb's composition on Pyre, calling it "gorgeous". Kirk Hamilton of Kotaku wrote that Pyre "feels organically built around [Korb's] playful, tonally varied soundscapes," and added that the game's visual novel storytelling approach "allows for a much more clear-cut use of the interlocking segments of Korb's music, which gives the listener a better appreciation for all the clever ways he layers additional voices and instruments onto each tune's foundation."

Korb also ventured into voice acting on Pyre, providing the voice for some side characters. Korb set out to "give the soundtrack the feel of a band of troubadours accompanying [the player] on [their] journey." The soundtrack saw Korb use autoharp.

=== Hades (2020) ===
Korb served as the composer for Supergiant's Hades, heavily inspired by Greek mythology. Officially released in 2020, the game was made available in early access on PC in 2018. That year, Korb released "Out of Tartarus", a song from the game's soundtrack, as a single. Korb described the genre of the Hades soundtrack as "Mediterranean prog rock Halloween". As the game leaned heavily into a Mediterranean sound, the soundtrack of Hades included traditional instruments such as Greek bouzouki, as well as the Turkish lavta and baglama. Hades also featured metal guitar, wind, and percussion instrumentation. Notis wrote on the Hades soundtrack, calling it a natural progression for Korb's musical career, writing "It's all there: the industrial electric drums, the string instrument harmonies, the delectable crunchy tone that's so baked-in you can practically taste it."

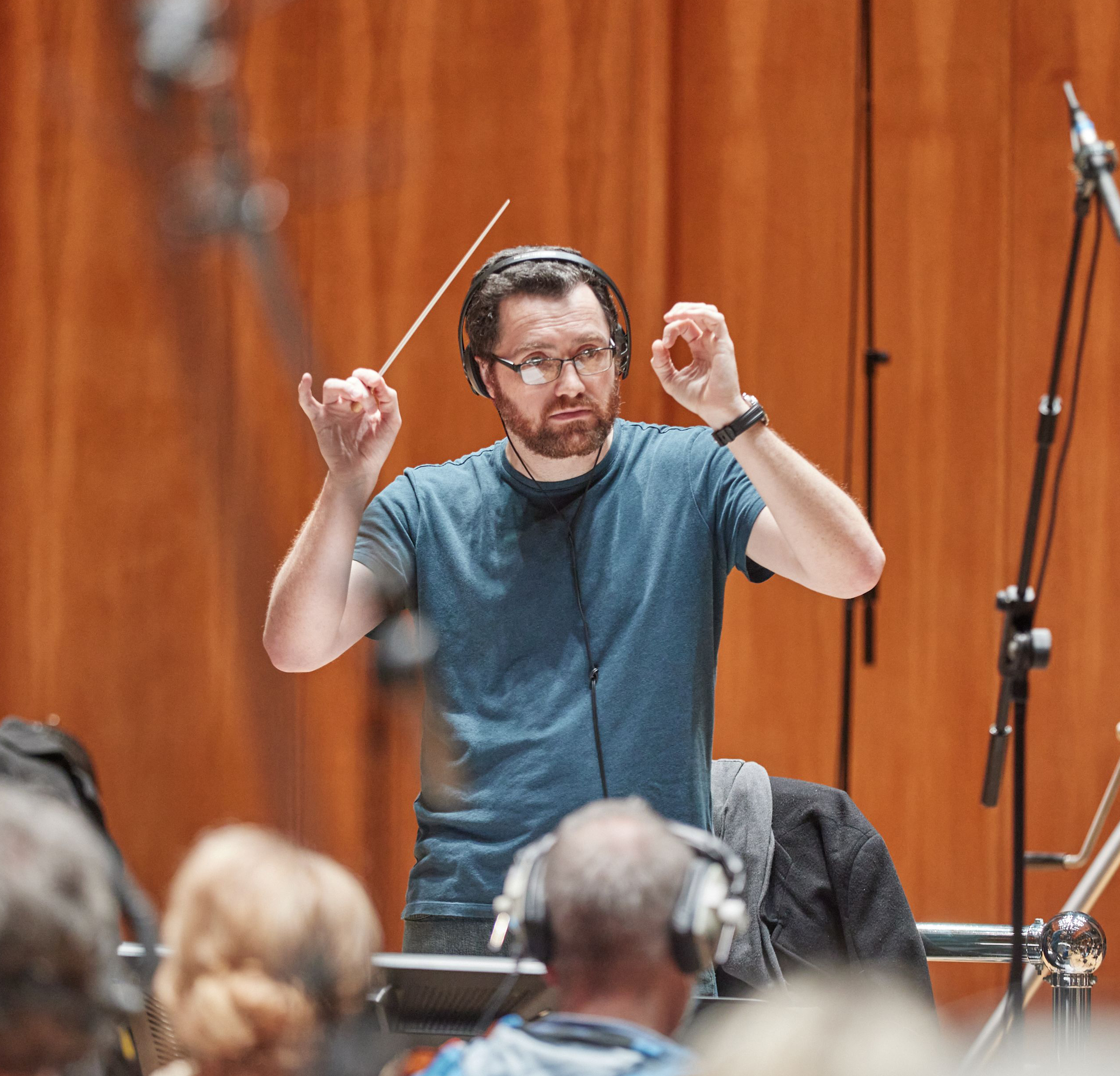
Fellow composer Austin Wintory collaborated with Korb on certain tracks on Hades.

Austin Wintory, a contemporary of Korb's, collaborated on the Hades soundtrack, helping with the orchestral arrangements for "On the Coast" and "In the Blood". Some tracks on Hades were recorded at Abbey Road shortly prior to the COVID-19 pandemic. Korb once again worked with Barrett on Hades, with her vocals featuring throughout its soundtrack. Tracks featured in the game were released as singles, once the game was released, as Korb and Supergiant "wanted to have the music available outside of the game right away."

The soundtrack received praise from critics, with many mentioning it as a positive in their reviews of the game. Including the soundtrack on their list of best video game soundtracks and scores of 2020, IGN wrote that "Korb's masterful movements are finely tuned to meet every moment – from the rocking, frenetic energy of battle scores to the more calm, meditative, and wistful pieces that underscore some of the story's most emotional moments." The game won various industry awards, and Korb's work on its audio and music received wins and nominations from The Game Awards, the D.I.C.E. Awards, the BAFTA Games Awards, and the Game Audio Network Guild Awards.

On Hades, Korb delved further into voice acting, providing the voice for the game's main character, Zagreus. When Supergiant first began developing Hades, Korb recorded placeholder dialogue for Zagreus, but received the role as the development team preferred Korb's take on the character when reviewing audition tapes. Inspired by the Greek mythological figure of the same name, Korb's interpretation of Zagreus features a "crisp, understated British accent." Elizabeth Ballou of Vice commented that "hints of both sarcasm and warmth keep the protagonist relatable," and added that many fans of the game found the character's voice attractive. Korb additionally voiced Skelly, a minor character, and also provided the singing voice for Orpheus, Hades' court musician.

=== Other projects ===
While recording for Hades at Abbey Road, Korb also recorded Songs of Supergiant Games, an orchestral album commemorating the developer's ten-year anniversary. Present at the Abbey Road recording session for Hades, Wintory also helped contribute to the anniversary album. In December 2022, Supergiant announced Hades II, a sequel to Hades, with Korb again composing the soundtrack. The game was released in 2025.

== Artistry ==
=== Musical style ===
Korb is a multi-instrumentalist, while describing guitar as his main instrument. He has also used bass, drums, ukulele, banjo, and mandolin. Korb has also used "weird circuit bent synthesisers", modified "toy synthesisers from the '80s", as well as the Casio SK-1 keyboard and the theremin on Casio SA-2. Korb has stated that his instrument usage depends on the sonic palette for a game and that he enjoys writing on instruments he's "not great at," saying it helps him ignore "the sort of muscle memory of chords" he likes to play and instead forces him to use his ears to guide his process. Korb's style has been noted by video game and music writers as distinct from project to project. Natalie Clayton of Rock Paper Shotgun wrote that Korb "has an extremely playful, unique approach to genre, from Bastion's acoustic trip-hop to Hades' Ancient Greek metal riffs."

When beginning work on a game's composition, Korb mainly focuses on the "vibe" of its sound, stating "if I start with a particular feel in mind, this dictates a lot of things about the piece right away, such as tempo, production aesthetic, tonal palate (happy, sad, major, minor, and so on), and gives me some useful constraints for how to proceed." Representative of Korb's work on video game soundtracks is the usage of song lyrics to let the player "into character's emotions and motivations."

=== Influences ===
Korb has cited Weezer, They Might Be Giants, Radiohead, Björk, Ozma, Spiraling, and Led Zeppelin as artists and bands he listened to frequently during his adolescence. Korb has also cited Lena Raine, Vulfpeck, and Louis Cole of Knower as artists he is a fan of.

== Awards and nominations ==
Year	Ceremony	Category	Work	Result	Ref.
2011	Spike Video Game Awards	Best Original Score	Bastion	Won	
2011	Spike Video Game Awards	Best Song in a Game	"Build That Wall"	Won	
2011	Spike Video Game Awards	Best Song in a Game	"Setting Sail, Coming Home (End Theme)"	Nominated	
2012	Game Audio Network Guild Awards	Best Audio in a Casual/Indie/Social Game	Bastion	Won	
2012	Game Audio Network Guild Awards	Rookie of the Year	—N/a	Won	
2014	National Association of Video Game Trade Reviewers Awards	Original Light Score Mix, New IP	Transistor	Nominated	
2014	National Association of Video Game Trade Reviewers Awards	Song Collection	Transistor	Nominated	
2014	National Association of Video Game Trade Reviewers Awards	Song, Original or Adapted	"We All Become"	Nominated	
2014	The Game Awards	Best Score/Soundtrack	Transistor	Nominated	
2015	D.I.C.E. Awards	Outstanding Achievement in Original Music Composition	Transistor	Nominated	
2015	Game Audio Network Guild Awards	Best Audio in an Indie Game	Transistor	Won	
2015	Game Audio Network Guild Awards	Best Original Song: Pop	"We All Become"	Finalist	
2018	Game Audio Network Guild Awards	Best Interactive Score	Pyre	Nominated	
2020	The Game Awards	Best Score and Music	Hades	Nominated	
2021	D.I.C.E. Awards	Game of the Year	Hades	Won	
2021	D.I.C.E. Awards	Action Game of the Year	Hades	Won	
2021	D.I.C.E. Awards	Outstanding Achievement for an Independent Game	Hades	Won	
2021	D.I.C.E. Awards	Outstanding Achievement in Game Direction	Hades	Won	
2021	D.I.C.E. Awards	Outstanding Achievement in Character (Zagreus)	Hades	Nominated	
2021	BAFTA Games Awards	Audio Achievement	Hades	Nominated	
2021	BAFTA Games Awards	Music	Hades	Nominated	
2021	Game Audio Network Guild Awards	Music of the Year	Hades	Nominated	
2021	Game Audio Network Guild Awards	Best Music for an Indie Game	Hades	Nominated	
2021	Game Audio Network Guild Awards	Best Original Soundtrack Album	Hades	Nominated	
2021	Game Audio Network Guild Awards	Best Original Song	"In The Blood"	Nominated	
2021	National Association of Video Game Trade Reviewers Awards	Original Light Score Mix, New IP	Hades	Won	
2021	National Association of Video Game Trade Reviewers Awards	Song Collection	Hades	Nominated	
2021	National Association of Video Game Trade Reviewers Awards	Song, Original or Adapted	"Good Riddance"	Nominated	
2026	D.I.C.E. Awards	Action Game of the Year	Hades II	Won	
2026	D.I.C.E. Awards	Outstanding Achievement in Game Direction	Hades II	Nominated	
