= Transistor (video game) =

2014 video game

- Developer: Supergiant Games
- Publisher: Supergiant Games
- Designers: Amir Rao; Greg Kasavin
- Programmers: Christopher Jurney; Gavin Simon; Andrew Wang
- Artist: Jen Zee
- Writer: Greg Kasavin
- Composer: Darren Korb
- Platforms: PlayStation 4, Windows, Linux, OS X, iOS, Nintendo Switch
- Release: May 20, 2014: Windows; WW: May 20, 2014; PlayStation 4; NA: May 20, 2014; PAL: May 21, 2014; Linux, OS X; WW: October 30, 2014; iOS; WW: June 11, 2015; tvOS; WW: November 2, 2015; Nintendo Switch; WW: November 1, 2018
- Genres: Action role-playing, turn-based strategy
- Mode: Single-player

Transistor is an action role-playing game developed and published by Supergiant Games. The game was released in May 2014 for Microsoft Windows and PlayStation 4, for OS X and Linux in October 2014, and iOS devices in June 2015. Transistor sold over one million copies across all platforms by December 2015.

In Transistor, the player controls Red, a popular singer in the city of Cloudbank, as she moves through the sci-fi-themed cityscape and battles robotic enemies collectively known as the Process. The game is presented through an isometric camera and features both real-time combat and a frozen, turned-based mode. The player is armed with a greatsword-like weapon, the titular Transistor, through which various powers called Functions are used against the enemies.

== Gameplay ==
Transistor uses an isometric point of view. The player controls the main character, Red, as she travels through a series of locations, battling enemies known collectively as the Process in both real-time combat and a frozen planning mode referred to as "Turn()". Using Turn() drains the action bar, which refills after a short delay. Until it is full again, Red cannot use Turn(), or any other power (with a few exceptions). Red earns experience points after each battle, and may collect new powers (called Functions) from fallen victims of the Process.

Functions can be used in several ways. First, they can be equipped in one of four active skill slots. Second, they can be used as an upgrade to augment another equipped Function. Third, they can be equipped in a passive skill slot for a persistent effect during battle. For example, the Function Spark() may be used to fire an explosive attack, to split the effects of another Function, or to passively spawn Red's decoys. With a total of 16 Functions, there are many combinations, allowing for a great degree of customization to fit different play styles.

Red can also collect and activate Limiters, which serve as optional debuffs during combat, but in turn increase experience gained. Both Functions and Limiters reveal lore from Transistor's world after being used for a certain amount of time.

== Plot ==
Red, a popular singer in the city of Cloudbank, kneels by the body of a man who has been killed with a glowing greatsword—the Transistor. The attack took away her voice, sealing it inside the Transistor. The sword also absorbed the man's consciousness, and through it he is able to speak to Red, acting as her guide and the game's narrator. As Red escapes, she is attacked by an army of intelligent robots known as the Process. She also discovers several Cloudbank citizens who have been "integrated" by the Process and absorbs their trace data into the Transistor, expanding the weapon's functionality.

Red makes her way to Cloudbank's Goldwalk district, where she learns that the Process is being controlled by the Camerata, a sinister group of high-ranking officials. The Camerata have been integrating individuals of influence through the Transistor; they were the ones who attacked Red, though the murder attempt was thwarted when the man stepped in front of the blow. At her former performance stage, Red confronts and defeats Sybil Reisz, a Camerata member in a corrupted Process-like form. She uses Sybil's knowledge of the Camerata to locate their leader—one of the administrators of Cloudbank, Grant Kendrell.

As Red enters the Highrise district, the Process becomes more aggressive, attacking the entire city indiscriminately. Asher Kendrell, another member of the Camerata, publicly reveals the Camerata's involvement and apologizes for their actions. It becomes apparent that the Camerata have lost control of the Process. After battling numerous Process enemies, including a massive creature referred to as the "Spine", Red reaches the hideout of the Camerata in Bracket Towers, only to find that Grant and Asher have committed suicide.

Resolving to track down the final member of the Camerata, Royce Bracket, and then escape the city, Red and her companion travel through Goldwalk, which has been "Processed" into a blocky, white facsimile of its original form. Royce approaches Red through a robotic proxy and offers to work together to stop the Process. He reveals that the Transistor, along with its docking point, the Cradle, are part of the apparatus used by the city's administrators to manipulate the landscape and environment of Cloudbank in order to satisfy the whims of the people. After fighting through the completely Processed district of Fairview, Red meets Royce and places the Transistor into the Cradle. This brings an end to the Process attack but also absorbs Red and Royce into the Transistor's virtual realm.

Royce informs Red that only one of them can return to Cloudbank and the two clash. After defeating Royce, Red is transported back into the city, where she begins rebuilding its Processed areas. Upon un-Processing the man's body and learning he cannot be restored from inside the Transistor, she sits down beside him and—despite his protests and pleadings otherwise—impales herself with the Transistor. In the closing credits sequence, it is shown that the man is reunited with Red within the virtual world of the Transistor. In a heartfelt embrace, she reveals that her voice has been restored.

== Development ==
Supergiant Games began working on Transistor full-time in September 2012, though early concepts were already being developed the fall of 2011, around the time the studio wrapped up on their first game, Bastion. The game was created by a team of twelve people, up from seven on Bastion. The team was led by studio director Amir Rao, with Greg Kasavin as its creative director and writer. Jen Zee was the game's art director and Darren Korb was its composer and audio director. The game was developed primarily in Supergiant's new office in SoMa, San Francisco, though some audio work was done in New York City.

The studio decided early on that the game would feature a science-fiction love story in a cyberpunk setting. In designing Cloudbank, which eventually evolved into a "romanticized, anachronistic quasi-futuristic city", art director Jen Zee took inspiration from Art Nouveau artists such as Gustav Klimt and Alphonse Mucha, whose work was characterized by elongated, natural patterns and liberal use of the color gold.

Through the gameplay of Transistor, Supergiant sought to capture the "drama and suspense" of turn-based strategy games within an action/RPG game. They wanted to create a system which, according to Rao, would discourage players from "forming early or rigid attachments to particular abilities" and encourage experimentation. Magic: The Gathering was a key early influence on the game's combat system, which was eventually simplified to a "deck" of 16 functions. Fallout, Fallout 2, and Final Fantasy Tactics also informed the design of the game's strategy aspect.

A playable version of the game was debuted at the March 2013 PAX East event. While Bastion was initially published by Warner Bros. Interactive Entertainment, Supergiant opted to distribute Transistor through self-publishing. Transistor was released worldwide on May 20, 2014 on Windows through Steam. It was released on the same day in North America for PlayStation 4, and was made available in Europe the following day. The game became available on OS X and Linux on October 30, 2014, and on iOS devices on June 11, 2015. A version for Nintendo Switch was released on November 1, 2018.

=== Music ===
Transistor Original Soundtrack

Soundtrack album by Darren Korb
- Released: May 20, 2014
- Genre: Electronic
- Length: 72:23
- Producer: Darren Korb

Transistor's soundtrack was written and produced by Darren Korb. It was released simultaneously with the game on May 20, 2014. Ashley Lynn Barrett, who was the female vocalist in Bastion's soundtrack, returned to provide vocals for "The Spine", "In Circles", "We All Become", "Signals", and "Paper Boats". The musical style of the soundtrack has been described by Korb as "old-world electronic post-rock". To fit that genre of music, the instruments used includes electric guitars, harps, accordions, mandolins, electric piano, and synth pads. Additionally, an EQ filter is overlaid over the music during the pause and "Turn()" menus to have a distant, blurred sound.

The soundtrack sold 48,000 copies within the first ten days of release.

On November 2, 2015, to commemorate Transistor's release on Apple TV, a new bonus track written and produced by Darren Korb, "She Shines" was added to the soundtrack. Ashley Barrett returned to provide the vocals.

== Reception ==
Reception

Aggregate score
Aggregator	Score
Metacritic	PS4: 83/100; PC: 83/100 iOS: 93/100; NS: 86/100

Review scores
Publication	Score
Destructoid	8.5/10
Game Informer	9/10
GameSpot	8/10
IGN	9/10
Polygon	8.5/10
TouchArcade	5/5

Transistor has been well received by game critics, receiving an 8/10 from GameSpot, 8.5/10 from Destructoid, 9/10 from IGN, and an 8.5/10 from Polygon. It also has an 83 out of 100 on review aggregator Metacritic based on 57 reviews for PlayStation 4 and 35 reviews for Microsoft Windows, indicating "generally favorable reviews".

The game's visuals and soundtrack have been praised by reviewers. Richard Niak of Game Critics wrote that the aesthetics of Cloudbank, the game's main setting, are "a key factor in understanding the story and the destruction being wrought by the Process." Danielle Riendeau of Polygon wrote that Transistor is "oozing with style and aesthetic charm," and that the music and voice "set it apart aesthetically" and infuse the game with personality and life.

The game's combat system has been received favorably, with many reviewers praising the game's flexibility and the variety of possible ability combinations. Christian Donlan of Eurogamer called the combat system "a tight system in which almost nothing is wasted and experimentation is encouraged."

The game's storytelling has received mixed reactions. Chris I. of Digitally Downloaded wrote: "Like Bastion before it, Transistor's strength isn't found in its action-RPG elements alone, but in the way that its narrative unravels along." Marty Sliva of IGN praised the game on how it "relies on subtlety in a way that few games ever do" in regards to its storytelling and worldbuilding. Danielle Riendeau praised the game's "fragmentary but effective" storytelling. Matt Miller on Game Informer, however, notes that the linearity of the game made it "feel repetitive" and called it "an isolating adventure". Daniel Podgorski of The Gemsbok called the plot and its presentation "interestingly deep yet frustratingly vague". He noted the game "does with its narrative so much more and so much better than many other titles", but concluded that Transistor "opts for mystery over clarity."

As of January 2015, the game has sold 600,000 copies. By December 2015, the game had surpassed one million copies sold and had received over 100 industry accolades and awards.

=== Accolades ===
List of post-release awards and nominations
Year	Awards	Category	Result	Ref.
2014	The Game Awards	Best Independent Game	Nominated	
2014	The Game Awards	Best Score/Soundtrack	Nominated	
2014	Giant Bomb's 2014 Game of the Year Awards	Best Music	Nominated	
2014	National Academy of Video Game Trade Reviewers (NAVGTR) awards	Song, Original or Adapted (We All Become)	Nominated	
2014	National Academy of Video Game Trade Reviewers (NAVGTR) awards	Original Light Mix Score, New IP	Nominated	
2014	National Academy of Video Game Trade Reviewers (NAVGTR) awards	Game, Original Role Playing	Nominated	
2014	National Academy of Video Game Trade Reviewers (NAVGTR) awards	Song Collection	Nominated	
2014	National Academy of Video Game Trade Reviewers (NAVGTR) awards	Game Design, New IP	Nominated	
2014	National Academy of Video Game Trade Reviewers (NAVGTR) awards	Character Design	Nominated	
2014	National Academy of Video Game Trade Reviewers (NAVGTR) awards	Art Direction, Contemporary	Nominated	
2014	Gametrailers's Game of the Year Awards	Best Strategy	Won	
2015	IGN's Best of 2014	Best Graphics - Art	Won	
2015	IGN's Best of 2014	Best Music	Nominated	
2015	IGN's Best of 2014	Best Overall Game	Nominated	
2015	IGN's Best of 2014	Best PS4 Game	Nominated	
2015	IGN's Best of 2014	Best Sound Design	Nominated	
2015	IGN's Best of 2014	Best Strategy	Nominated	
2015	AIAS' 18th Annual D.I.C.E. Awards	D.I.C.E. Sprite Award	Won	
2015	AIAS' 18th Annual D.I.C.E. Awards	Outstanding Achievement in Original Music Composition	Nominated	
2015	Game Developers Choice Awards	Best Audio	Nominated	
2015	British Academy Awards (BAFTA)	Performer in 2015 (Logan Cunningham)	Nominated	
2015	SXSW Gaming Awards	Excellence in Musical Score	Won	
2015	SXSW Gaming Awards	Excellence in Art	Nominated	
2015	SXSW Gaming Awards	Excellence in Visual Achievement	Nominated	
2015	SXSW Gaming Awards	Most Valuable Character (Red)	Nominated	
