= Zagreus (Hades) =

Hades protagonist

- Hades character
- Zagreus in Hades
- First appearance: Hades (2020)
- Created by: Greg Kasavin
- Designed by: Jen Zee
- Voiced by: Darren Korb

In-universe information
- Species: Demigod
- Family: Hades (father); Persephone (mother); Melinoë (sister)

Zagreus is a fictional character and the protagonist of the 2020 video game Hades. He is based on the mythological figure of the same name, used after Greg Kasavin saw him as a good fit for the repetitive nature of a roguelike game due to his story of attempting to leave the Underworld and his father Hades. His design was intentionally made to be attractive, with artist Jen Zee wanting to stay true to classical tradition, such as the ideas of heroic nudity in Ancient Greek culture.

He was designed to be bisexual and polyamorous, though his polyamory was a relatively late addition. Kasavin explained that these factors were added as part of his desire to explore a world with different values and a lack of prejudice found in the real world, as well as wanting to depict Ancient Greek culture. He is voiced by Darren Korb, who took inspiration from actor Asa Butterfield and character Loki from the Marvel Cinematic Universe. Zagreus has been generally positively received, identified as a standout LGBT character for his bisexuality and polyamory. These aspects were particularly praised, with critics noting how uncommon it was for them to be depicted positively.

== Concept and creation ==
Zagreus is based on the god of the same name in Greek mythology. Before Zagreus was the protagonist of Hades, the team planned to have the character Theseus be the protagonist. This changed when creative director Greg Kasavin convinced them that Zagreus would be more interesting. Kasavin stated that little was known about the mythological figure, and what was known sometimes contradicted each other. He considered Zagreus in Hades to be a power fantasy, stating: "He's a God, he's faster, he's stronger, he's better looking than most of us, he knows how to say all the right things at all the right times." Another factor that influenced the use of Zagreus was the fact that Hades was a roguelike, and the concept of Zagreus attempting to escape the Underworld and his father Hades, trying and failing multiple times, worked well for the genre. When asked why Zagreus and other characters in the game were so attractive, Kasavin attributed this to Jen Zee, the game's character artist. He stated that the portrayal of Zagreus and the rest "owe greatly to classical tradition," which Zee cared about. He added that they justified the gods being hot by virtue of them being gods.

He was designed to be bisexual, with Kasavin stating that the values of Ancient Greece were different than those in the United States and the United Kingdom, viewing it as an opportunity to make a world with values unlike those of today. He argued that, being a fantasy setting, it would be boring to follow set rules and values, stating that the idea of a world free of today's prejudices would be refreshing. When designing the game's cast, Kasavin stated that they made sure each character relationship with Zagreus both showed a different aspect of the game's world, but also Zagreus' personality. He also touched upon the possible polyamorous relationship between Zagreus, Megaera, and Thanatos, noting that their relationship developed over time instead of being present from the beginning. He discussed that polyamory would make sense for gods, as they did not face the same challenges as mortals, though he noted that polyamory fit the Ancient Greece setting as well.

Zagreus is voiced by Darren Korb. He was originally only recording placeholder dialogue for Zagreus, but the team found that they enjoyed his take on the character. Korb's performance was described by Waypoint writer Elizabeth Ballou as a "crisp, understated British accent, but hints of both sarcasm and warmth keep the protagonist relatable." When crafting his voice, Korb used multiple inspirations, such as actor Asa Butterfield, but he took primarily from the character Loki from the Marvel Cinematic Universe. When Korb found out that his performance as Zagreus was considered attractive, he was surprised, saying he didn't intend that.

== Fictional character biography ==
Zagreus is the protagonist of the 2020 video game Hades. In it, his goal is to escape the Underworld, which is ruled by his father, Hades, with the aspiration of meeting his demigoddess mother, Persephone, on the surface. Along the way, he does battle with the forces of Hades, including the Fury Sister Megaera and the hero Theseus. He also encounters various Olympian gods, such as Athena, Zeus, and Aphrodite, who offer him boons to help him on his journey. As Zagreus progresses, he travels through Tartarus, Asphodel, Elysium, and the Temple of Styx, each representing a different region of the Underworld. As Zagreus progresses, he can converse with multiple characters, and is able to pursue relationships with characters such as Megaera, Thanatos, and Dusa, with the former two being potentially romantic.

He appears as a collectible Spirit in the video game Super Smash Bros. Ultimate.

== Reception ==
Paste writer Holly Green felt that Zagreus' experiences throughout the game were relatable to the player, particularly Zagreus' ignorance of the Olympians. She also discussed how the cycle of failure and progress was motivated by the desire to learn more about the game's world. Fellow Paste writer Rosy Hearts discussed the relationship between Persephone and Zagreus, particularly the pain of experiencing Zagreus die as a stillborn, as well as his struggle with her absence and her attempts to have him understand why she won't return to the Underworld with him. He was the runner-up for the best protagonist of 2020 award at RPGFan. RPGFan writer Alana Hagues praised him, calling him a "lovable idiot with a heart of gold" and saying it only took 10 minutes for her to come to love his sassy personality and sweet nature. She felt that this was the definitive depiction of the mythological figure. Kotaku writer Ash Parrish found Zagreus attractive; she discussed his appearance in the initial trailer, particularly his "breathless sigh, multicolored eyes, [and] hair flip which is nothing more than an excuse to show off his dummy thicc pectorals." as well as appreciating how tender he was.

Paste writer Elijah Gonzales discussed how the game handles Zagreus' relationship with Thanatos and Megaera, analyzing how his desire to escape the Underworld conflicts with the relationships he developed there. He appreciated that Zagreus was a bisexual character, feeling that action games were oversaturated by "gruff straight dude[s] with a buzzcut" and that Zagreus' depiction avoids being a "bundle of stereotypes," particularly the notion that bisexual people are "sex-crazed." He felt that he was a well-rounded character, being defined by more than just his sexuality. He also enjoyed that nobody in the game took issue with his sexuality, noting how bisexual people often face bias from both gay and straight people. NME writer Dom Peppiat also praised the depiction of his bisexuality, feeling that it was among the best depictions of bisexuality in video games. He felt that media typically depicted it as "scandalous," or otherwise not depicted at all. With Zagreus, he found him to be a "sensitive and considerate lover," believing that the quality of this depiction influenced Hades's popularity with the LGBTQ+ community. He also touched upon what he felt was the game industry's tendency to depict bisexuality as "player-sexual," with the character being attracted to the player-character due to them being controlled by the player rather than actually being gay or bisexual. He felt that the game made it clear that characters were attracted to Zagreus rather than the player. Wired writer Gabriel Aikins also discussed the polyamory between the three, as well as the matter of kink and consent in their relationship. They argued that polyamorous relationships were a rarity in media, games or otherwise. On kink, Aikins discussed the interpretation of Zagreus and Megaera's relationship as a dominant-submissive one, with Megaera serving as the sadist and Zagreus the masochist, suggesting this correlated with the gameplay experience of Zagreus and Megaera's multiple battles with one another.

Wired writer Autumn Wright felt that Zagreus being a minor deity in Greek mythology made him a "great canvas" for a player-character. They described him as "charming, emotionally mature, polychromatic, young, and muscular" while discussing how he fits the concept of the ephebe, which they felt was an unattainable ideal for most men. They also discussed how Zagreus contrasted with Thanatos and Megaera, who they describe as twinkish and androgynous respectively, commenting that each represents a "subvers[ion] to classical tradition." The Mary Sue writer Briana Lawrence appreciated the relationship between Zagreus and Dusa, particularly how the friendship between them develops the same way as the romantic relationships with Thanatos and Megaera do.
