= Hades (video game) =

2020 video game

- Developer: Supergiant Games (Note: iOS version ported by Secret 6)
- Publisher: Supergiant Games (Note: The PlayStation and Xbox versions were published on physical media by Private Division. iOS port published by Netflix.)
- Designers: Amir Rao; Gavin Simon; Greg Kasavin; Eduardo Gorinstein; Alice Lai
- Programmers: Gavin Simon; Andrew Wang; Dexter Friedman; Alice Lai; Nikola Sobajic
- Artist: Jen Zee
- Writer: Greg Kasavin
- Composer: Darren Korb
- Platforms: macOS; Nintendo Switch; Windows; PlayStation 4; PlayStation 5; Xbox One; Xbox Series X/S; iOS
- Release: macOS, Switch, Windows; September 17, 2020; PS4, PS5, Xbox One, Series X/S; August 13, 2021; iOS; March 19, 2024
- Genres: Roguelike, action role-playing, hack and slash
- Mode: Single-player

Hades is a 2020 roguelike action role-playing game developed and published by Supergiant Games. It was released for macOS, Nintendo Switch, and Windows on September 17, 2020, following an early access release in December 2018. It was later released for PlayStation 4, PlayStation 5, Xbox One, and Xbox Series X/S in August 2021, and was released for iOS in March 2024 through Netflix Games.

Players control Zagreus, the son of Hades, in his many attempts to escape from the Underworld and find his mother, Persephone. Aided by boons the Olympians bestow on him, he battles through a random series of rooms populated with enemies and bosses at the end of each section. The game features a hack and slash combat system; the player uses a combination of a main weapon attack, a special attack, a dash ability, and a magic ability to defeat enemies while avoiding damage to progress as far as possible. While Zagreus will often die, he can use the treasure gained during these failed runs to improve certain attributes or unlock new weapons and abilities to increase the chance of escaping on subsequent runs.

Hades was developed following Supergiant's Pyre, in which they wanted to explore procedural narrative storytelling. However, due to the nature of the gameplay, they found that players did not play through it multiple times to explore this. The roguelike structure of Hades allowed them to tell these branching stories to the player over the course of multiple playthroughs.

Hades has been cited among the greatest video games of all time, with critics praising its narrative, gameplay, art style, music, and voice acting. It sold more than one million copies and was named game of the year by several award ceremonies and media publications. A sequel, Hades II, was released in early access in 2024, and had its full release in 2025.

== Gameplay ==
Hades is presented in an isometric view, with the player controlling Zagreus (center) as he fights his way out of the Underworld.

The player controls Zagreus, the prince of the Underworld, who seeks to escape the realm to get away from his unloving father Hades and reach his mother Persephone in the mortal world. Along his quest, the other Olympians support him, granting him gifts called Boons to help him fight the beings that guard the exit to the Underworld. He is also aided by notorious residents of the Underworld, such as Sisyphus, Eurydice, and Patroclus. The game world is divided between four main dungeons; Tartarus, Asphodel, Elysium, and the Temple of Styx, each representing one of the regions of the Underworld, with each new region being unlocked upon clearing the previous.

The game is presented in an isometric view, with the player controlling Zagreus. The player starts a run by fighting through several rooms drawn from a pool of pre-determined layouts, with the order they appear in and the enemies that appear being randomized. The game features a hack and slash combat system.

The player has a primary attack and a secondary "special" attack depending on their pre-determined weapon of choice, a magic "cast" that can be used from a distance, a dash that provides momentary intangibility and mobility, allowing the player to phase through thin enough walls and gaps, and can deal damage when combined with an attack or Boon, and a summon attack that can call upon the power of one of the Gods. Throughout a run, the Olympians will provide Boons, each of which provides a choice of three persistent boosts and effects for that run that the player can select from. The Boons are themed based on the Olympian; for example, Zeus's Boons provide lightning damage effects and Poseidon's provide push-back wave effects.

The player moves through rooms to gradually ascend through the Underworld; after clearing a room, the player is given the room's rewards, allowing them to grow stronger or recover lost health points. However, if Zagreus' health points drop to zero while he has no "death defiance" tokens left, he is defeated and taken by the river Styx back to the House of Hades, which effectively acts as the game's overworld between attempts. Hades features a combination of roguelike and dungeon-crawler elements, where obols and certain types of upgrades are lost upon death and must be collected anew each time, while other types of currency can be used at the House to purchase permanent upgrades that affect future attempts. After clearing a certain number of rooms in a region, the player must fight the bosses of the region to advance to the next; at least one of the three Furies in Tartarus, the Lernaean Hydra in Asphodel, Theseus and Asterius the Minotaur in Elysium, and Hades at the gates of the Underworld.

Between runs, Zagreus can explore the House of Hades before setting out on a new escape attempt. Here, the player can use items recovered from runs to impact the meta-game. The player can unlock and upgrade abilities for Zagreus, order construction of new Underworld features that can appear in future runs, or obtain or upgrade new weapons. They can also have Zagreus interact with the various characters of the Underworld and improve his standing with them, which provide narrative elements to the game and can also provide quests with additional rewards. The player can also romance non-player characters (NPCs) as the plot progresses, including Megaera and Thanatos.

After defeating Hades at least once, the player can manually customize and increase the difficulty of the gameplay by using the Pact of Punishment, allowing them to add extra challenges or modify aspects of the game. For example, the Pact can increase the attack power, health or the number of enemies on runs, and change parts of gameplay by changing boss fights, such as allowing Theseus to use a machine-gun-mounted chariot or adding an extra phase to Hades' boss fight. By continuously increasing difficulty, the player can continue to receive rare rewards after runs, unlock special decorative items at the House, and progress certain NPC subplots.

Alternatively, the player can activate a setting called God Mode, which makes the player character stronger after each failed run through the Underworld. This allows players who struggle with the game to progress more easily and experience the full story of the game.

== Plot ==
Zagreus (Darren Korb), the firstborn son of Hades (Logan Cunningham), seeks to escape his father's realm in the Underworld. He is aided in his quest by his adoptive mother Nyx (Jamie Landrum), the Gods of Olympus to whom he has reached out, and other inhabitants of the Underworld. Hades claims that escape is impossible and hinders Zagreus by unleashing the Underworld's monsters on him. Each time Zagreus is slain, he is revived at the House of Hades, a palace where he and other Chthonic gods reside, which he leaves to attempt another escape.

It is eventually revealed that Zagreus wishes to escape the Underworld to find his biological mother Persephone (Laila Berzins) whom he never knew due to being told that he was the child of Nyx. Hades refuses to allow her name to be spoken in his House, and it is said that those who disobey this order will be punished. Nyx decides to help Zagreus find the truth about his birth mother by putting him in contact with his relatives on Mount Olympus, including Zeus (Peter Canavese), Poseidon (Logan Cunningham), Ares (Cyrus Nemati), Aphrodite (Courtney Vineys), Artemis (Jamie Landrum), Athena (Marianne Miller), Demeter (Laila Berzins), Dionysus (Cyrus Nemati), and Hermes (Andrew Marks). After eventually reaching the exit to the Underworld and defeating Hades, Zagreus finds Persephone at a cottage in Greece. After they reunite, Zagreus discovers that since he, like Hades, is bound to the Underworld, he will quickly die after reaching the surface. Despite this, he promises to keep escaping the Underworld to spend time with Persephone and learn the truth about her absence.

Over the course of these visits, it is revealed that Zeus "gave" Persephone to Hades as a reward for ruling over the Underworld with the other Olympians believing that she simply disappeared. The two had a loving marriage until Zagreus was stillborn due to the Fates having decreed that Hades would never have an heir. Persephone ran away in grief, but refused to return to her birthplace on Olympus which she disliked due to the Olympians' constant bickering. Nyx eventually resurrected Zagreus after making a deal with the Fates. Persephone refuses to return to the Underworld because she fears retribution towards Hades if the Olympians discover the truth about her disappearance. Zagreus eventually convinces her to return after reminding her of the bonds of family, and Charon (Logan Cunningham) ferries them to the House of Hades. Persephone resumes her duties as Queen of the Underworld. Now with renewed respect for his son, Hades requests that Zagreus continue his escape attempts to identify further security vulnerabilities in the Underworld.

In an epilogue, Persephone tells Zagreus of her idea of reconciling with the Olympians by inviting them to a feast in the House. At the feast, they claim that Hades and Persephone eloped and had Zagreus, while saying that due to her having eaten Underworld pomegranate seeds, she can only leave the Underworld a few months out of the year. The Olympians accept this explanation, though it is implied they know the truth and wish to move on. With everyone reconciled, Zagreus' duties to escape his home continue.

== Development ==
Following the release of their previous game, Pyre, Supergiant Games was interested in opening up their development process, intending to use player feedback to improve both gameplay and narrative elements. The studio thus opted for an early access approach in developing Hades, after establishing the game's foundation.

As Supergiant was still a small team of about 20 employees, they knew they could only support early access across one platform, with the intent to port to other platforms near the completion of the game. Supergiant had spoken to Epic Games and learned of their intent to launch their own Epic Games Store, and felt the experimental platform was an appropriate match with Hades. Supergiant's decision was made in part due to Epic's focus on content creators, as Supergiant had developed Hades in mind to be a game favorable to streamers, which would be benefited through the Epic Games Store. Supergiant anticipated that Hades would take about three years to complete, comparable to the development time of their previous titles.

In terms of the game's narrative and approach, the Supergiant team had discussed what type of game they wanted to make next, and settled on a concept that would be easy to pick up and play, which could be played in very short periods, and had opportunities for expanding on after release, driving them towards a roguelike game, which have generally best utilized the early access approach. The roguelike approach also fit well with their past gameplay design goals, where they aimed to continue to add in new tricks or tools for the player that would make them reconsider how they have been playing the game to that point. Pyre had been an attempt to create a branching open-ended narrative, but once the game was released, Supergiant recognized that most players would only play through the game once and thus lose out on the branching narrative perspective. With Hades established as a roguelike, the team felt the branching narrative approach would be much more appropriate since the genre calls for players to repeatedly play through the game.

For the setting, Supergiant considered revisiting the worlds from their previous games but felt a wholly new setting would be better. Supergiant's creative director Greg Kasavin came onto the idea of Greek mythology, a topic he had been interested in since his youth. Originally, it was planned to name the game Minos, with the hero Theseus as the player-character seeking an exit from the ever-shifting mazes of Minos. The mazes readily supported the roguelike facets but Supergiant found it difficult to incorporate the branching narrative factors. They also found that Theseus was too generic of a character to fit their narrative.

During a development break, Kasavin researched more into Greek myths and found that Hades was underrepresented in these stories, as the Olympians feared him. This discovery led Kasavin towards having the game centered on Zagreus attempting to escape from Hades and the Underworld as a more interesting narrative approach. Kasavin compared the gods as "a big dysfunctional family that we can see ourselves in", and that by having Zagreus repeatedly try and fail to escape from Hades, it would provide both the type of slapstick comedy that he felt captured the relationships in this "family", as well as the player experience typically associated with roguelikes where one moment the player may feel invincible only to be quickly defeated and brought back to the start the next moment. The change from Theseus to Zagreus had minimal impact on the game content they had developed to that point, and helped in establishing the gameplay connection to the narrative; Theseus remained in the game but his role became that of a boss character, transforming him to a boastful villain along with a tag-team partner of Asterius the Minotaur. The Greek God narrative also informs the benefits that the player obtains as they progress through the game, representing the different powers of the gods, and various gameplay elements such as Trials of the Gods, emphasizing the fickle relationship the gods had with each other. These bits of dialog are advanced with each run through the game, thus making each attempt to escape meaningful compared to traditional roguelikes, which Supergiant felt would help draw more players into the game.

In contrast to Bastion and Transistor, which were more linear games and thus had more control over how the player progressed, Hades presented the challenge of writing dialog for the multitude of routes the player could progress in the game. Kasavin and his writers drafted out about ten hours' worth of dialog between Zagreus and the non-player characters based on a large number of potential chained events that could happen to the player. For example, while in a run, the player may encounter Eurydice, and on return to the main hub after failing the run, meet Eurydice's husband Orpheus, who, because of that prior meeting, asks the player to deliver a message to Eurydice the next time they encounter her. These dialog events also tied into improvements at the hub once the player saw through the chain of events.

Supergiant remained committed to honoring the Greek mythology throughout the game. The game's art, primarily by in-house artist Jen Zee, show all of the Olympians as attractive with tasteful homage to the "heroic nudity" of ancient Greek art, according to Kasavin. The game also explores the diverse sexuality that was present in the Greek myths; Zagreus is bisexual and in certain routes polyamorous, while one side narrative explores the gay relationship between Achilles and Patroclus.

During the development process of Hades, Supergiant decided to rewrite their custom game engine to provide better game performance and better cross platform support. Their original engine, which was written in C# and used the Microsoft XNA framework, had been used by the studio for all of their games since Bastion. While making Hades, due to the technical limitations and difficulties of hardware porting and other performance aspects, Supergiant decided to rewrite their engine using C++ based on the framework The Forge to benefit from the increased performance that native code provides.

=== Audio ===
The soundtrack was composed by Darren Korb, audio director at Supergiant Games. The soundtrack also features Ashley Barrett, Masahiro Aoki and Daisuke Kurosawa.

According to Korb "...one of the unique challenges of this game, in particular, is we expect people to play it for dozens, hundreds of hours, you know. So I wrote about two and a half hours of music for Hades. And it's got to stand up to people playing the game for maybe a couple hundred hours."

== Release ==
Hades was announced at The Game Awards 2018 on December 6, 2018, and confirmed as one of the first third-party titles to be offered on the newly-announced Epic Games Store. According to Geoff Keighley, the host and organizer of the Game Awards show, Supergiant's Amir Rao and Greg Kasavin approached him at the 2018 D.I.C.E. Summit in February about Hades and their intention to release it as an early access title on the same day of the Game Awards.

Hades was a timed-exclusive on the Epic Games Store, later releasing for Steam on December 10, 2019. Supergiant officially released the game out of early access on September 17, 2020, coinciding with the release on the Nintendo Switch platform. Though cross-save between the Windows and Switch version had been planned at that point, Supergiant had to put this off until a patch that was released in December 2020, with cross-saving enabled through the Epic Games Store account platform.

A physical Nintendo Switch edition of Hades was released on March 19, 2021. Ports for PlayStation 4, PlayStation 5, Xbox One, and Xbox Series X/S were released on August 13, 2021. An iOS port was released on March 19, 2024 through Netflix Games, but was removed from the platform on July 14, 2025.

== Reception ==
Reception

Aggregate scores
Aggregator	Score
Metacritic	NS: 93/100; PC: 93/100; PS5: 93/100; XSX: 93/100
OpenCritic	99% recommend

Review scores
Publication	Score
Destructoid	9/10
Edge	9/10
Eurogamer	Essential
Famitsu	38/40
Game Informer	8.5/10
GameSpot	9/10
IGN	9/10
Jeuxvideo.com	18/20
Nintendo Life	10/10
Nintendo World Report	10/10
PC Gamer (US)	90/100
The Guardian	5/5

Hades received "universal acclaim", according to review aggregator website Metacritic. Fellow review aggregator OpenCritic assessed that the game received "mighty" approval, being recommended by 99% of critics. Critics praised Hades for its story, characters, gameplay and soundtrack. IGN praised the characters, writing that they each "[felt] like an authentic reinterpretation of a classic Greek myth...they're all a joy to behold." The Guardian liked art director Jen Zee's work on the game, particularly her portraits of the characters, calling them "wonderfully drawn" and "with appropriate godlike profiles." Jordan Devore of Destructoid enjoyed the story, feeling the dialogue made use of its non-linear nature "without coming across as artificial". Game Informer's Matt Miller felt that "the combat is fast-paced and challenging" and there was variety in the enemies Zagreus would face, although Miller thought that the combat could rely on button mashing at certain points. Suriel Vazquez, writing for GameSpot felt that the worldbuilding complimented "a robust postgame that... offers even more reasons to play an already entrancing mix of RPG and action combat".

During its nearly two-year long early access period, Hades sold 700,000 copies. Within three days of its official release, it sold an additional 300,000 copies for a sales total of over one million. Hades has been described by several outlets as one of the greatest games of all time.

=== Speedrunning community ===
Hades has attracted a large speedrunning community due to the roguelike nature of the game and high replayability. In August 2023, a speedrun of the game received attention from the media and developers for successfully beating the game on maximum difficulty, which was previously thought to be impossible.

=== Awards ===
Hades won several awards and honors. At the 10th Annual New York Game Awards, it won in the Game of the Year, Best Music, Best Writing, and Best Acting categories. Several publications considered it one of the best video games of 2020, including Polygon, Giant Bomb, IGN, USGamer, Destructoid, Time, The Washington Post, Slant Magazine, and Entertainment Weekly. It won Game of the Year at the 17th British Academy Games Awards, the 24th Annual D.I.C.E. Awards, the 10th Annual New York Game Awards, the inaugural Gayming Awards, the 21st Game Developers Choice Awards, and the inaugural Global Industry Game Awards. Hades also was the first game to be awarded a Hugo Award as part of a special video games category introduced for the 2021 Hugo Awards.

In a review of Hades in Black Gate, John ONeill said of its Hugo Award win, "I hope the WSFS decides to continue this category. Video games have become a solid reservoir for powerful storytelling, and 16 years after Roger Ebert infamously said that they will never be art, the craftsmen behind the industry have proven him wrong. But if they do not and Hades remains the only Hugo-winning video game, it will wear the laurel well."

Year	Award	Category	Result	Ref.
2020	Golden Joystick Awards	Ultimate Game of the Year	Nominated	
2020	Golden Joystick Awards	PC Game of the Year	Nominated	
2020	Golden Joystick Awards	Best Storytelling	Nominated	
2020	Golden Joystick Awards	Best Visual Design	Nominated	
2020	Golden Joystick Awards	Best Indie Game	Won	
2020	Golden Joystick Awards	Critic's Choice	Won	
2020	The Game Awards 2020	Game of the Year	Nominated	
2020	The Game Awards 2020	Best Game Direction	Nominated	
2020	The Game Awards 2020	Best Narrative	Nominated	
2020	The Game Awards 2020	Best Art Direction	Nominated	
2020	The Game Awards 2020	Best Score and Music	Nominated	
2020	The Game Awards 2020	Best Performance for Logan Cunningham	Nominated	
2020	The Game Awards 2020	Best Indie	Won	
2020	The Game Awards 2020	Best Action	Won	
2020	The Game Awards 2020	Player's Voice	Nominated	
2020	The Steam Awards	Game of the Year	Nominated	
2021	17th British Academy Games Awards	Best Game	Won	
2021	17th British Academy Games Awards	Artistic Achievement	Won	
2021	17th British Academy Games Awards	Audio Achievement	Nominated	
2021	17th British Academy Games Awards	Game Design	Won	
2021	17th British Academy Games Awards	Music	Nominated	
2021	17th British Academy Games Awards	Narrative	Won	
2021	17th British Academy Games Awards	Original Property	Nominated	
2021	17th British Academy Games Awards	Performer in a Supporting Role for Logan Cunningham	Won	
2021	32nd GLAAD Media Awards	Outstanding Video Game	Nominated	
2021	24th Annual D.I.C.E. Awards	Game of the Year	Won	
2021	24th Annual D.I.C.E. Awards	Action Game of the Year	Won	
2021	24th Annual D.I.C.E. Awards	Outstanding Achievement for an Independent Game	Won	
2021	24th Annual D.I.C.E. Awards	Outstanding Achievement in Game Direction	Won	
2021	24th Annual D.I.C.E. Awards	Outstanding Achievement in Game Design	Won	
2021	24th Annual D.I.C.E. Awards	Outstanding Achievement in Art Direction	Nominated	
2021	24th Annual D.I.C.E. Awards	Outstanding Achievement in Character (Zagreus)	Nominated	
2021	24th Annual D.I.C.E. Awards	Outstanding Achievement in Story	Nominated	
2021	Nebula Award	Best Game Writing	Won	
2021	Hugo Award	Best Video Game (Special Award)	Won	
2021	10th Annual New York Game Awards	Big Apple Award for Best Game of the Year	Won	
2021	10th Annual New York Game Awards	Off Broadway Award for Best Indie Game	Won	
2021	10th Annual New York Game Awards	Tin Pan Alley Award for Best Music in a Game	Won	
2021	10th Annual New York Game Awards	Statue of Liberty Award for Best World	Nominated	
2021	10th Annual New York Game Awards	Herman Melville Award for Best Writing	Won	
2021	10th Annual New York Game Awards	Great White Way Award for Best Acting in a Game for Logan Cunningham	Won	
2021	21st Game Developers Choice Awards	Game of the Year	Won	
2021	21st Game Developers Choice Awards	Best Audio	Won	
2021	21st Game Developers Choice Awards	Best Design	Won	
2021	21st Game Developers Choice Awards	Innovation Award	Nominated	
2021	21st Game Developers Choice Awards	Best Narrative	Nominated	
2021	21st Game Developers Choice Awards	Best Visual Art	Nominated	
2021	SXSW Gaming Awards 2021	Video Game of the Year	Won	
2021	SXSW Gaming Awards 2021	Excellence in Narrative	Nominated	
2021	SXSW Gaming Awards 2021	Excellence in Game Design	Won	

== Sequel ==
A sequel, Hades II, was announced at The Game Awards 2022, and launched in early access for Windows in May 2024, and in October 2024 for MacOS. The full game was released on September 25, 2025, alongside versions for the Nintendo Switch and Nintendo Switch 2. Its protagonist is Melinoë, the Princess of the Underworld and sister of Zagreus, who seeks to defeat Chronos, the Titan of Time, with help from Hecate, the goddess of witchcraft, and other Olympian gods and figures. Besides similar melee combat moves from the first game, Melinoë has access to spells that consume mana, and can collect ingredients while traversing the Underworld to craft boons and other gear at special rooms.
