= 17th British Academy Games Awards =

Game award ceremony in 2021

- Date: 25 March 2021
- Location: Live-streamed
- Hosted by: Elle Osili-Wood
- Best Game: Hades
- Most awards: Hades (5)
- Most nominations: The Last of Us Part II (14)

The 17th British Academy Video Game Awards was hosted by the British Academy of Film and Television Arts on 25 March 2021 to honour the best video games of 2020. It was held as a live-streamed event due to the ongoing COVID-19 pandemic, with Elle Osili-Wood as host. This was Wood's first time hosting the ceremony, taking over from Dara Ó Briain who had hosting the BAFTAs ten times between 2008 and 2020.

The nominees were announced on 2 March 2021, with The Last of Us Part II receiving a record-setting fourteen nominations, beating the eleven nominations received by Control and Death Stranding at the previous ceremony. Hades was named as Best Game, as well as winning the most awards (five).

== Nominees and winners ==
The nominations were announced on 2 March 2021. The winners were announced through a livestreamed presentation on 25 March 2021, due to ongoing concerns from the COVID-19 pandemic.

Best Game: Hades – Supergiant Games; Animal Crossing: New Horizons – Nintendo EPD/Nintendo; Ghost of Tsushima – Sucker Punch Productions/Sony Interactive Entertainment; Half-Life: Alyx – Valve Corporation; The Last of Us Part II – Naughty Dog/Sony Interactive Entertainment; Spider-Man: Miles Morales – Insomniac Games/Sony Interactive Entertainment	Animation: The Last of Us Part II – Naughty Dog/Sony Interactive Entertainment; Doom Eternal – id Software/Bethesda Softworks; Final Fantasy VII Remake – Square Enix; Spider-Man: Miles Morales – Insomniac Games/Sony Interactive Entertainment; Ori and the Will of the Wisps – Moon Studios/Xbox Game Studios; Spiritfarer – Thunder Lotus/Kowloon Nights
Artistic Achievement: Hades – Supergiant Games; Cyberpunk 2077 – CD Projekt Red; Dreams – Media Molecule/Sony Interactive Entertainment; Ghost of Tsushima – Sucker Punch Productions/Sony Interactive Entertainment; Half-Life: Alyx – Valve Corporation; The Last of Us Part II – Naughty Dog/Sony Interactive Entertainment	Audio Achievement: Ghost of Tsushima – Sucker Punch Productions/Sony Interactive Entertainment; Astro's Playroom – Japan Studio/Sony Interactive Entertainment; Hades – Supergiant Games; Half-Life: Alyx – Valve Corporation; The Last of Us Part II – Naughty Dog/Sony Interactive Entertainment; Spider-Man: Miles Morales – Insomniac Games/Sony Interactive Entertainment
British Game: Sackboy: A Big Adventure – Sumo Digital/Sony Interactive Entertainment; Dreams – Media Molecule/Sony Interactive Entertainment; F1 2020 – Codemasters; Fall Guys – Mediatonic/Devolver Digital; The Last Campfire – Hello Games; Röki – Polygon Treehouse/United Label	Debut Game: Carrion – Phobia Game Studio/Devolver Digital; Airborne Kingdom – The Wandering Bard; Call of the Sea – Out of the Blue/Raw Fury Games; Factorio – Wube Software; The Falconeer – Tomas Sala/Wired Productions; Röki – Polygon Treehouse/United Label
Evolving Game: Sea of Thieves – Rare/Xbox Game Studios; Destiny 2: Beyond Light – Bungie; Dreams – Media Molecule/Sony Interactive Entertainment; Fall Guys – Mediatonic/Devolver Digital; Fortnite – Epic Games; No Man's Sky – Hello Games	Family: Sackboy: A Big Adventure – Sumo Digital/Sony Interactive Entertainment; Animal Crossing: New Horizons – Nintendo EPD/Nintendo; Astro's Playroom – Japan Studio/Sony Interactive Entertainment; Dreams – Media Molecule/Sony Interactive Entertainment; Fall Guys – Mediatonic/Devolver Digital; Minecraft Dungeons – Mojang Studios/Double Eleven
Game Beyond Entertainment: Animal Crossing: New Horizons – Nintendo EPD/Nintendo; Before I Forget – 3-Fold Games; Dreams – Media Molecule/Sony Interactive Entertainment; Spiritfarer – Thunder Lotus/Kowloon Nights; The Last of Us Part II – Naughty Dog/Sony Interactive Entertainment; Tell Me Why – Dontnod Entertainment/Xbox Game Studios	Game Design: Hades – Supergiant Games; Animal Crossing: New Horizons – Nintendo EPD/Nintendo; Astro's Playroom – Japan Studio/Sony Interactive Entertainment; Ghost of Tsushima – Sucker Punch Productions/Sony Interactive Entertainment; Half-Life: Alyx – Valve Corporation; The Last of Us Part II – Naughty Dog/Sony Interactive Entertainment
Multiplayer: Animal Crossing: New Horizons – Nintendo EPD/Nintendo; Deep Rock Galactic – Ghost Ship Games/Coffee Stain Publishing; Fall Guys – Mediatonic/Devolver Digital; Ghost of Tsushima – Sucker Punch Productions/Sony Interactive Entertainment; Sackboy: A Big Adventure – Sumo Digital/Sony Interactive Entertainment; Valorant – Riot Games	Music: Spider-Man: Miles Morales – Insomniac Games/Sony Interactive Entertainment; Ghost of Tsushima – Sucker Punch Productions/Sony Interactive Entertainment; Hades – Supergiant Games; The Last of Us Part II – Naughty Dog/Sony Interactive Entertainment; Ori and the Will of the Wisps – Moon Studios/Xbox Game Studios; Sackboy: A Big Adventure – Sumo Digital/Sony Interactive Entertainment
Narrative: Hades – Supergiant Games; Assassin's Creed Valhalla – Ubisoft Montreal/Ubisoft; Cyberpunk 2077 – CD Projekt; Ghost of Tsushima – Sucker Punch Productions/Sony Interactive Entertainment; Kentucky Route Zero: TV Edition – Cardboard Computer/Annapurna Interactive; Spider-Man: Miles Morales – Insomniac Games/Sony Interactive Entertainment	Original Property: Kentucky Route Zero: TV Edition – Cardboard Computer/Annapurna Interactive; Carrion – Phobia Game Studio/Devolver Digital; Fall Guys – Mediatonic/Devolver Digital; Ghost of Tsushima – Sucker Punch Productions/Sony Interactive Entertainment; Hades – Supergiant Games; Spiritfarer – Thunder Lotus/Kowloon Nights
Performer in a Leading Role: Laura Bailey as Abby in The Last of Us Part II; Cody Christian as Cloud Strife in Final Fantasy VII Remake; Nadji Jeter as Miles Morales in Spider-Man: Miles Morales; Ashley Johnson as Ellie in The Last of Us Part II; Cherami Leigh as Female V in Cyberpunk 2077; Daisuke Tsuji as Jin Sakai in Ghost of Tsushima	Performer in a Supporting Role: Logan Cunningham as Hades, Achilles, Poseidon, Asterius, Charon, and the Storyteller in Hades; Troy Baker as Joel in The Last of Us Part II; Patrick Gallagher as Khotun Khan in Ghost of Tsushima; Jeffrey Pierce as Tommy in The Last of Us Part II; Carla Tassara as Judy Alvarez in Cyberpunk 2077; Shannon Woodward as Dina in The Last of Us Part II
Technical Achievement: Dreams – Media Molecule/Sony Interactive Entertainment; Demon's Souls – Japan Studio/Sony Interactive Entertainment; Doom Eternal – id Software/Bethesda Softworks; Microsoft Flight Simulator – Asobo Studio/Xbox Game Studios; The Last of Us Part II – Naughty Dog/Sony Interactive Entertainment; Spider-Man: Miles Morales – Insomniac Games/Sony Interactive Entertainment	EE Game of the Year: The Last of Us Part II – Naughty Dog/Sony Interactive Entertainment; Animal Crossing: New Horizons – Nintendo EPD/Nintendo; Call of Duty: Warzone – Raven Software, Infinity Ward/Activision; Ghost of Tsushima – Sucker Punch Productions/Sony Interactive Entertainment; Hades – Supergiant Games; Valorant – Riot Games

BAFTA Fellowship: Siobhan Reddy

=== Games with multiple nominations and wins ===
==== Nominations ====
Nominations	Game
14	The Last of Us Part II
11	Ghost of Tsushima
9	Hades
7	Spider-Man: Miles Morales
6	Animal Crossing: New Horizons
6	Dreams
5	Fall Guys
4	Cyberpunk 2077
4	Half-Life: Alyx
4	Sackboy: A Big Adventure
3	Astro's Playroom
3	Spiritfarer
2	Carrion
2	Doom Eternal
2	Final Fantasy VII Remake
2	Kentucky Route Zero: TV Edition
2	Ori and the Will of the Wisps
2	Röki
2	Valorant

==== Wins ====
Wins	Game
5	Hades
3	The Last of Us Part II
2	Animal Crossing: New Horizons
2	Sackboy: A Big Adventure
