= Bastion (video game) =

2011 video game

- Developer: Supergiant Games
- Publisher: Warner Bros. Interactive Entertainment (Note: The publishing rights reverted to Supergiant Games in September 2019.)
- Designer: Amir Rao
- Programmers: Gavin Simon; Andrew Wang
- Artist: Jen Zee
- Writer: Greg Kasavin
- Composer: Darren Korb
- Engine: Microsoft XNA
- Platforms: Windows; OS X; Linux; Xbox 360; Xbox One; iOS; PlayStation 4; PlayStation Vita; Nintendo Switch
- Release: July 20, 2011: Xbox 360; July 20, 2011; Windows; August 16, 2011; Linux, OS X; April 26, 2012; iOS; August 29, 2012; PlayStation 4; April 7, 2015; PlayStation Vita; December 5, 2015; Xbox One; December 12, 2016; Switch; September 13, 2018
- Genre: Action role-playing
- Mode: Single-player

Bastion is a 2011 action role-playing video game developed by independent developer Supergiant Games and originally published by Warner Bros. Interactive Entertainment. In the game, the player controls "the Kid" as he moves through floating, fantasy-themed environments and fights enemies of various types. It features a dynamic voiceover from a narrator (Logan Cunningham), and is presented as a two-dimensional game with an isometric camera and a hand-painted art style. Bastion's story follows the Kid as he collects special shards of rock to power a structure, the Bastion, in the wake of an apocalyptic Calamity.

The game was built over the course of two years by a team of seven people split between San Jose and New York City. They introduced the game at the September 2010 Penny Arcade Expo, and it went on to be nominated for awards at the 2011 Independent Games Festival and win awards at the Electronic Entertainment Expo prior to release. Bastion was published in July 2011 for Xbox 360 via Xbox Live Arcade, and in August 2011 through digital distribution for Microsoft Windows on Steam. Supergiant Games made it available as a browser game for Google Chrome in December 2011. It was released for Mac OS X and iOS in 2012, for PlayStation 4 and PlayStation Vita in 2015, for Xbox One in 2016, and Nintendo Switch in 2018. Bastion's soundtrack was produced and composed by Darren Korb, and a soundtrack album was made available for sale in August 2011.

During 2011, the game sold more than 500,000 copies, 200,000 of which were for the Xbox Live Arcade. It sold over three million copies across all platforms by January 2015. The game was widely praised by reviewers, primarily for its story, art direction, narration, and music. Opinions were mixed on the depth of the gameplay, though the variety of options in the combat system was praised. Bastion has won many nominations and awards since its release, including several for best downloadable game and best music, from review outlets such as IGN and Game Informer as well as from the Spike Video Game Awards, the Game Developers Conference, and the Academy of Interactive Arts & Sciences.

== Gameplay ==
The Kid fights in a floating, grassy ruin, aiming a bow at a monster. The interface shows the player's health, experience, fragments, selected weapons and special skill, and number of health and black tonics.

Bastion is an action role-playing game with a level structure. The player character, "the Kid", moves through floating, fantasy-themed environments that form paths as the player approaches the edge. Levels consist of a single plane, and are viewed isometrically. They are filled with enemies of various types, which attempt to harm the Kid. The Kid carries two weapons, which may be selected from the choices available to the player at specific locations called arsenals. The Kid also has the ability to perform a special attack. Weapons and special attacks must be acquired before they can be used. There are a limited number of special attacks that the player can perform at any time, represented by "black tonics" which can be found in the levels or dropped from enemies. Special attacks may be used a total of three times. This maximum number of uses can be increased in the Distillery. The Kid's health is represented by a health bar, which can be replenished with "health tonics". Like black tonics, the Kid can only carry a certain number of health tonics at a time, and can replenish them by finding more in the levels.

Levels contain many different environment types, including cities, forests, and bogs. At the end of most levels, the player collects an item called a core or a shard; occasionally, the level begins to disintegrate once the Kid takes the item, forcing him to hastily retreat. As the player progresses through the levels, a voice narrates their actions. This narration gives scripted plot information as well as dynamic comments, such as on the player's skill with a weapon or performance while fighting enemies.

Between levels, the Kid visits the Bastion, where the player can use fragments—the game's form of currency—that they have accrued to buy materials and upgrade weapons. With each core the player collects, they can add one of six structures to the Bastion, such as a shrine, an armory, or a distillery, and each shard allows the player to expand a structure. Each structure serves a different purpose; for example, the distillery lets the player select upgrades, and the shrine allows the player to choose idols of the gods to invoke, causing the enemies to become stronger and giving the player increased experience points and currency. Experience points are used to determine the Kid's ability level; higher values give the player more health and increase the number of upgrades they can select.

Whenever the player leaves the Bastion, they can choose between one or two regular levels to play. In addition to these levels, however, the Kid can engage in challenge courses designed to test the player's skills with the weapons the player has found. They are called Proving Grounds. The challenges differ depending on the weapon, such as destroying a certain number of objects within a given time or breaking targets in the fewest shots possible. According to the player's score, different tiers of prizes are awarded. Additionally, the Kid can fight waves of enemies while the narrator tells a character's backstory by journeying to "Who Knows Where" from the Bastion. The back story battles occur during 'Memories.' The player earns fragments and experience for each completed wave. After the game is completed, the player can choose to begin a "new game+" mode, where the player replays through the game while keeping the experience points, fragments, and weapons that they have gained. This mode also offers more options in the buildings, as well as two more journeys to "Who Knows Where".

== Plot ==
The game takes place in the aftermath of the Calamity, a catastrophic event that suddenly fractured the city of Caelondia (/seɪˈlɒndiə/) as well as the surrounding areas of the world into many floating pieces, disrupting its ecology and reducing most of its people to ash. The player takes control of the Kid, a silent protagonist who awakens on one of the few remaining pieces of the old world and sets off for the eponymous Bastion, where everyone was supposed to go in troubled times. The only survivor he meets there is an elderly man named Rucks, the game's narrator, who instructs him to collect the Cores that once powered Caelondia. A device in the Bastion can use the power of the crystalline Cores to create landmasses and structures, as well as enable the Kid to travel farther afield via "skyways" that propel him through the air.

During his quest, the Kid meets two more survivors: Zulf, an ambassador from the Ura, underground-dwelling people with whom Caelondia was once at war; and Zia, an Ura girl who was raised in Caelondia. Both of them return to the Bastion, but upon reading a journal that the Kid discovers, Zulf intentionally damages parts of the Bastion's central device (the monument) and travels to Ura territory. The Kid learns that the journal belonged to Zia's father, Venn, who had worked for the Caelondians. He had helped Caelondian scientists ("Mancers") build a weapon intended to destroy the Ura completely to prevent another war. Venn rigged the weapon to backfire, so that when he was finally forced to trigger it, the resulting Calamity destroyed most of Caelondia as well.

To repair Zulf's damage to the Bastion, the Kid starts collecting Shards, a lesser form of Cores. As he obtains the penultimate shard needed, the Ura attack the Bastion, damaging it and abducting Zia. In the next seven days, The Kid engages in sporadic skirmishes in Ura territory. When he finally blasts through an Ura outpost and meets Zia, she tells him that she had left with the Ura voluntarily to find out their intentions; Rucks had previously told Zia that the Bastion had the ability to somehow fix the Calamity. The Kid travels to the once-underground Ura homeland to retrieve the last shard. There, he discovers Zulf being attacked by his own people: the battle with the Kid has devastated the Ura forces, and they blame Zulf for bringing the Kid to their home. The Kid can choose to drop his weapon to help Zulf or leave him. If he leaves Zulf behind, the Kid destroys the remnants of the Ura and escapes through a skyway. If he chooses to carry Zulf, Ura archers initially open fire on them but ultimately cease fire and watch silently as the Kid and Zulf take the skyway back to the Bastion.

After the Kid returns and recovers, Rucks gives him another choice: He can have the Bastion rewind time to before the Calamity in the hopes of preventing it, or use it to evacuate the survivors and move on to somewhere safe. Rucks is unsure if there is any way to prevent the Calamity from reoccurring if the time is rewound, as there was no way to test the process. The game ends either way, showing images of the characters (with the inclusion of Zulf if the player chose to rescue him) flying away or of their lives before the Calamity along with the credits. In the New Game+ mode, which is unlocked after beating the game once, it is hinted that restoring the world did not prevent the Calamity.

== Development ==
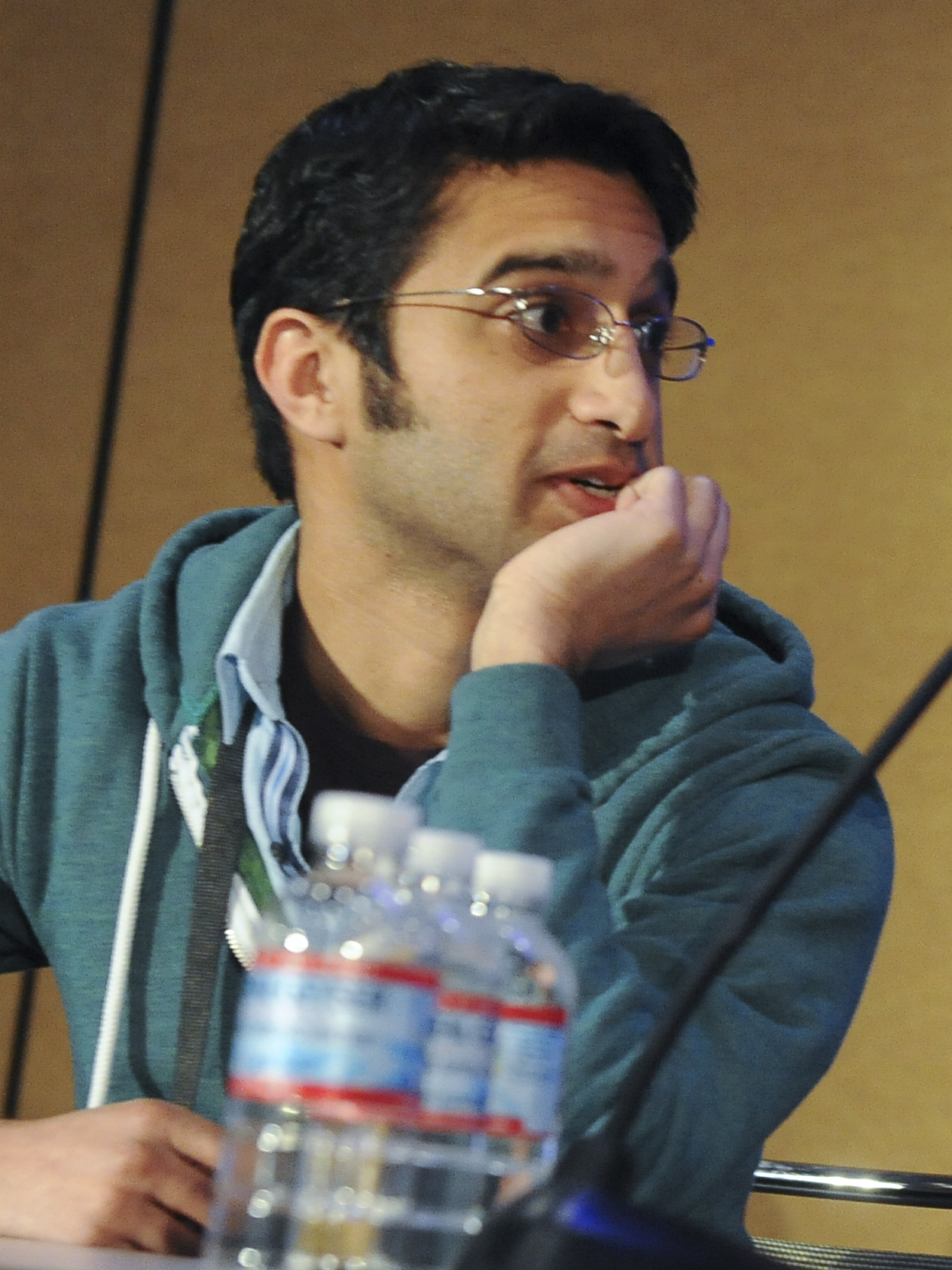
Director Amir Rao at the March 2012 Game Developers Conference

Bastion was created by a team of seven people, who composed the studio Supergiant Games. It was the company's first game. The game was directed by Amir Rao and Greg Kasavin wrote the game's narration, which was spoken by Logan Cunningham. Jen Zee was the artist, Gavin Simon developed the gameplay, Andrew Wang helped develop the game, and Darren Korb handled the sound effects and music. The co-founders of Supergiant Games, Rao and Simon, previously worked for Electronic Arts, where they helped develop Command & Conquer 3 and Red Alert 3. They left to form the studio because they wanted the development speed and the ability to try new ideas that would be possible with a smaller team. Development began on the game in September 2009. The team created the game over almost two years, and funded the development themselves. Most of the team built the game in a house in San Jose, though the music and voice acting were recorded in New York City. Some of the San Jose designers—including the writer—did not meet Rucks' voice actor in person until near the release of the game. The team spent the first nine months of development prototyping various ideas, before settling on the game's design.

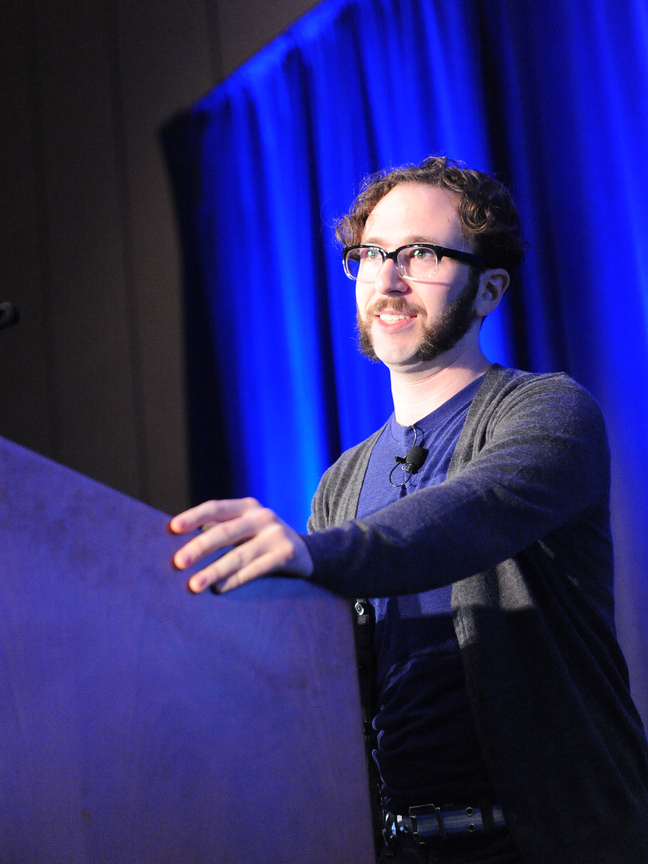
Composer Darren Korb at the March 2012 Game Developers Conference

The original idea was based around the premise of creating a town like those found in a role-playing game. The team chose the design elements of a fractured, floating world due to their wish to portray a sky in the game, which is usually not possible with an isometric camera, as it always points down. They also wanted to forgo a map system, and felt that having the ground come up to the Kid allowed the player to easily see without a map where they had already been in a level. The story of the Calamity was created as a way to explain this game mechanic. Jen Zee developed the art style of the game to express beauty in a post-apocalyptic landscape. The hand-painted style was intended to soften the sharpness she saw as typical in isometric games and the colorless, harsh depictions of most devastated landscapes. Zee was inspired by the pixel art landscapes of earlier Japanese isometric games.

The narrator was added early in the game's development as a way to provide background details and depth to the world without requiring the player to read long strings of text or wait through cutscenes. To avoid slowing the pace of the action-oriented gameplay, the team had the narrator mainly speak in short, evocative phrases, with long pauses between speaking parts. The narrator is intended to feel like an "old acquaintance" to the player, a connection built by his commentary on the player's actions as they happen, both major and minor. Kasavin sought to make the game feel as if it were the player's story, rather than just a story being watched. The development of Bastion was chronicled in the monthly Building the Bastion video series from October 2010 to May 2011 in which Supergiant Games collaborated with Kasavin's former GameSpot co-workers at Giant Bomb. The videos showed early game concepts in addition to the process of building the final game, as well as interviews with the team.

Supergiant Games showed an early, unplayable version of the game at the March 2010 Game Developers Conference, to little acclaim. They debuted a playable version of the game at the September 2010 Penny Arcade Expo, where it was well received. After a strong showing at the March 2011 Game Developers Conference, Warner Bros. Interactive Entertainment (WBIE) signed on to publish and distribute the game. The team decided to partner with a publisher in order to get through the process of Xbox Live certification. Bastion was released on July 20, 2011, for Xbox Live Arcade (XBLA), and on August 16, 2011, for digital distribution on Windows through Steam. It was released as a browser game for Google Chrome on December 9, 2011. A version for Mac OS X was made available via the Mac App Store on April 26, 2012, along with a SteamPlay update for Mac OS X and Windows. Ports followed for PlayStation 4 on April 7, 2015, PlayStation Vita on December 5, 2015, Xbox One on December 12, 2016, and Nintendo Switch on September 13, 2018. After the publishing agreement with WBIE expired in September 2019, Supergiant Games took over as publisher on all platforms.

=== Music ===
Bastion Original Soundtrack

Soundtrack album by Darren Korb
- Released: August 5, 2011
- Genres: Electronic; rock
- Length: 1:00:18
- Producer: Darren Korb

Bastion's soundtrack was produced and composed by Darren Korb, a songwriter and composer. He was selected to pen the soundtrack by Rao, who was a childhood friend of Korb. Bastion was the first video game that Korb had scored; prior to it he had worked on a few smaller television shows and movies. He was brought onto the team in the beginning stages of the project, and several of the pieces he developed were created prior to the final design of the levels with which they were associated. The musical style of the soundtrack has been described by Korb as "acoustic frontier trip hop". It was intended to evoke both the American frontier and an exotic fantasy world. The songs combine "heavily sampled beats in layers, along with acoustic elements", and he determined that he wanted to create the soundtrack in that style as it was different from video game soundtracks that he had heard before. The music was recorded in Korb's closet at his New York City apartment, as were the sound effects and more than three thousand lines of narration by Cunningham.

In addition to composing the music, Korb wrote all the lyrics for the soundtrack. The soundtrack features four vocal themes: "Build That Wall", "What's Left Undone", "Mother, I'm Here", and "Setting Sail, Coming Home". "Build That Wall" features the voice of Ashley Lynn Barrett, "What's Left Undone" features that of Cunningham and "Mother, I'm Here" features Korb, and both Korb and Barrett perform in "Setting Sail, Coming Home". Supergiant Games originally had not planned to release a full soundtrack album for the game, but due to fan demand they released one in digital format on August 5, 2011, with two songs not heard in the game. These songs are "Get Used to It", which has a voiceover written by Greg Kasavin and spoken by Logan Cunningham, and "The Pantheon (Ain't Gonna Catch You)", with lyrics written by Korb and sung by Cunningham. A physical limited edition CD signed by Korb was released on September 2. The soundtrack sold 30,000 copies by November 2011. On March 15, 2012, Supergiant Games released sheet music for piano and guitar arrangements by Korb of "Build That Wall", "Mother, I'm Here", "Setting Sail, Coming Home", and "The Pantheon (Ain't Gonna Catch You)" free in their online store. A two-disc vinyl record of the soundtrack was released in 2017 by Supergiant, and reissued in 2023 by iam8bit.

== Reception ==
Reception

Aggregate score
Aggregator	Score
Metacritic	X360: 86/100 (79 reviews); PC: 86/100 (17 reviews) iOS: 94/100 (12 reviews); PS4: 89/100 (13 reviews); XONE: 83/100 (4 reviews); NS: 90/100 (7 reviews)

Review scores
Publication	Score
1Up.com	A−
Edge	9/10
Eurogamer	8/10
Game Informer	9.25/10
GamePro	5/5
GameSpot	8.5/10
GameSpy	4/5
IGN	9/10
TouchArcade	5/5
VideoGamer.com	9/10

Bastion was released to strong sales and critical acclaim. The game sold more than 500,000 copies during 2011, 200,000 of which were for the Xbox Live Arcade. In March 2013 at the PAX East gaming convention, Bastion's creative director Greg Kasavin stated that the game had sold more than 1.7 million copies combined across all platforms. By May 2014, the game had sold over 2 million copies, and by January 2015, it had sold over 3 million. Bob Mackey of 1UP.com called it "the perfect mesh of game and story", and McKinley Noble of GamePro said that it "raises the visual and narrative bar for downloadable titles". Maxwell McGee of GameSpot called it "wonderfully crafted" and "an amazingly good time", and Greg Miller of IGN concluded that Bastion "is amazing and you owe it to yourself to download it". Jamin Smith of VideoGamer.com said that "Bastion is the perfect game to kick off Microsoft's Summer of Arcade", and compared it favorably with prior indie games Limbo and Braid.

The presentation of the game was widely praised, especially the narration. Mackey said that the game "could be sold on its presentation alone", focusing on the graphics, music, and story. Edge said that the narration added "emotional resonance" to the game, and Tom Bramwell of Eurogamer praised the "dazzling visuals" and "artful commentary". Game Informer's Matt Miller highlighted "the well-written narration, excellent music, and bright visuals" as factors that made the game feel "like a storybook in which you control the outcome." Of the presentation elements, the story was the least praised, though several reviewers such as Noble enjoyed it, saying that it "just gets better the further you delve into it." Ryan Scott of GameSpy, however, termed it a "just-sorta-there plot", and Greg Miller said that it "could have been better" and never "hooked" him.

Reviewers had a more mixed opinion of the gameplay. Mackey praised the variety of gameplay elements and said that combat has "a deceptive amount of depth", but Bramwell felt that the combat did not "invite experimentation" and was somewhat disappointing. Edge said that the gameplay was "more interested in variety than challenge", for which he praised it, and Matt Miller said that combat was "a lot of fun", though he felt it lacked "the depth, speed, or complexity of a true action game". Greg Miller highlighted the variety of the gameplay as the best part of the game, and Scott called it "enjoyable", though not "challenging".

=== Awards ===
The game won several awards, both before and after publication. It was nominated for the 2011 Independent Games Festival awards at the Game Developers Conference in the Excellence In Visual Art and Excellence In Audio categories. It went on to win the Game Critics Award for Best Downloadable Game of E3 2011, and received a nomination for Best Original Game. The game continued to be nominated for awards after release. It was nominated for the Best Independent Game award at the 2011 Spike Video Game Awards, and won the Best Original Score and Best Downloadable Game awards, "Build That Wall (Zia's Theme)" won the Best Song in a Game award, and "Setting Sail, Coming Home (End Theme)" was nominated for the same award. The Academy of Interactive Arts & Sciences awarded Bastion with Downloadable Game of the Year at the 15th Annual Interactive Achievement Awards; it also received nominations for Outstanding Innovation in Gaming and Outstanding Achievement in Story.

1UP.com gave Bastion their Best Narrative in a Game award, and Game Informer gave it the Best RPG Innovation award for the narration in the game. In GameSpot's Game of the Year awards, Bastion won the Song of the Year award for "Build That Wall" as well as the Readers' Choice award for Best Download-only Console Game. IGN termed it the "Best XBLA Game of 2011", and RPGamer gave the game their Role-Playing Game of the Year award. Official Xbox Magazine awarded it their Best Music award and nominated it for Best Art Direction, Role-Playing Game of the Year, and XBLA Game of the Year. The music won the Game Audio Network Guild's Best Audio in a Casual/Indie/Social Game award, and Darren Korb was selected as the Rookie of the Year. The game was nominated for the 2012 Game Developers Conference awards in the Innovation, Best Audio, and Best Narrative categories, and won the Best Downloadable Game award. Supergiant Games won the Best Debut award.
