= Pyre (video game) =

2017 action role playing video game

- Developer: Supergiant Games
- Publisher: Supergiant Games
- Designers: Amir Rao; Greg Kasavin
- Programmers: Gavin Simon; Andrew Wang
- Artist: Jen Zee
- Writer: Greg Kasavin
- Composer: Darren Korb
- Platforms: Linux; Microsoft Windows; PlayStation 4; macOS
- Release: Linux, Windows, PS4; July 25, 2017; macOS; August 3, 2017
- Genres: Action role-playing, sports
- Modes: Single-player, multiplayer

Pyre is an action role-playing video game developed and published by Supergiant Games. It was released in July 2017 for Microsoft Windows, Linux, and PlayStation 4, and in August 2017 for macOS. Elements from sports games were incorporated into the title's gameplay. It was the third game developed by Supergiant following Transistor (2014) and it received generally positive reviews upon release.

== Story and gameplay ==
The game takes place in a high-fantasy setting. The story is told through on-screen narrative passages that include a hyperlink-type system used by the player character to explore the story further. In addition to guiding the exiles during "Rites" which resemble a sports game, the Reader must determine how to help support or improve the party by performing activities such as scavenging for supplies, learning more of the world's lore, or mentoring the exiles to improve their abilities.

Through the land, the party encounters other groups of exiles, which starts the Rites, the game's combat system which was described by Marty Sliva of IGN as a mix of Defense of the Ancients, Rocket League, and Supergiant's previous game, Transistor. Rites take place on a field with two columns of flame, or pyres, at opposite ends and the three exiles facing off against three opponents, portrayed from a top-down perspective. Each team attempts to destroy the opposing pyre by launching a single glowing orb at it, which steadily whittles away at its health. The player controls only one character at a time by passing the orb among the three, with the character who has the orb being the one the player controls. A character traveling with the orb is vulnerable to being temporarily banished from the Rites if an enemy's aura touches them, which would drop the orb at their feet. The different characters have various skills that aid them in the Rites, such as dashes or long-range projectiles. Each of the player's characters also have different passive abilities that affect how they play, such as one that can move quickly around the arena but does little damage to the opponent's pyre, while another is slow and bulky, but can do the greatest damage.

The game includes a local multiplayer mode which allows two players controlling separate teams to compete. Supergiant was unsure if they would be able to include online multiplayer in time for the game's launch and opted to keep this mode to local as well as player-versus-computer matches for release.

== Development ==
The concept of Pyre came out from prototyping several game ideas by Supergiant Games, according to creative director Greg Kasavin, eventually coming to the theme of "what happens when you face defeat, and have to come back from it the next day, look your friends in the face, look yourself in the mirror, and deal with the consequences of the decisions you made". In trying to devise gameplay around the nature of failure, they came to see the use of sports as a metaphor for combat, featuring non-violent gameplay but consequences of losing. To connect these battles, the developers came onto the use of a narrative idea to have the player guide their party across an overworld, making decisions on where to go based on available resources and timing. They worked through prototyping to adjust how this part of the game would affect the Rites, adjusting the interaction of these two gameplay systems to get an appropriate balance. Kasavin stated they were worried that as some aspects of the game may be confusing, players that were not invested in the game's narrative would not come to appreciate some of these systems, and that if they were providing enough variation in the game to retain the player's interest over time.

The game was announced in April 2016 and first demonstrated in playable form at the 2016 Penny Arcade Expo shortly afterwards. Kasavin and his team used this PAX testing to help evaluate how they had set up some of these gameplay systems. The game was released on July 25, 2017.

== Reception ==
Reception

Aggregate score
Aggregator	Score
Metacritic	PC: 82/100; PS4: 85/100

Review scores
Publication	Score
Destructoid	8.5/10
Electronic Gaming Monthly	9/10
Game Informer	8.75/10
GameRevolution	5/5
GameSpot	9/10
IGN	9.7/10
PC Gamer (US)	71/100
Polygon	9/10

Pyre received "generally positive" reviews, according to review aggregator Metacritic.

IGN praised the integration of narrative choices and gameplay in Pyre, writing that "Branching storylines have become common in games, but it's rare that one integrates momentous, gut-wrenching choices with the other elements of its gameplay as deftly as Pyre does." Ars Technica liked the visuals of the game, particularly the hand drawn character portraits, calling them "personality-loaded" and additionally praising the animation of the game. Wes Fenlon of PC Gamer criticized the Rite gameplay, feeling that the teammates did not help the player much, saying that "the rest of your team stands still while you control them".

Eurogamer ranked the game 41st on their list of the "Top 50 Games of 2017", and EGMNow ranked it 17th in their list of the 25 Best Games of 2017, while Polygon ranked it 22nd on their list of the 50 best games of 2017. The game was nominated for "Best PC Game", "Best RPG", "Best Art Direction", "Best Story", and "Most Innovative" in IGN's Best of 2017 Awards; it was also nominated for "Best Shopkeeper" (Falcon Ron) and "Best Cast of Characters" in Giant Bomb's 2017 Game of the Year Awards. It won the award for "Best Indie" in Game Informer's 2017 RPG of the Year Awards.

=== Accolades ===
Year	Award	Category	Result	Ref
2017	Golden Joystick Awards	Best Storytelling	Nominated	
2017	Golden Joystick Awards	Best Visual Design	Nominated	
2017	Golden Joystick Awards	Best Audio	Nominated	
2017	Golden Joystick Awards	Best Indie Game	Nominated	
2017	The Game Awards 2017	Best Independent Game	Nominated	
2018	New York Game Awards 2018	Off-Broadway Award for Best Indie Game	Nominated	
2018	New York Game Awards 2018	Tin Pan Alley Award for Best Music in a Game	Nominated	
2018	21st Annual D.I.C.E. Awards	D.I.C.E. Sprite Award	Nominated	
2018	Emotional Games Awards 2018	Best Emotional Game Design	Nominated	
2018	National Academy of Video Game Trade Reviewers Awards	Art Direction, Fantasy	Nominated	
2018	National Academy of Video Game Trade Reviewers Awards	Game, Original Role Playing	Won	
2018	National Academy of Video Game Trade Reviewers Awards	Original Light Mix Score, New IP	Nominated	
2018	National Academy of Video Game Trade Reviewers Awards	Song, Original or Adapted ("Vagrant Song")	Nominated	
2018	16th Annual Game Audio Network Guild Awards	Best Interactive Score	Nominated	
2018	2018 Webby Awards	Best Multiplayer/Competitive Game	Nominated	
