= Supergiant Games =

American video game developer and publisher

Supergiant Games, LLC
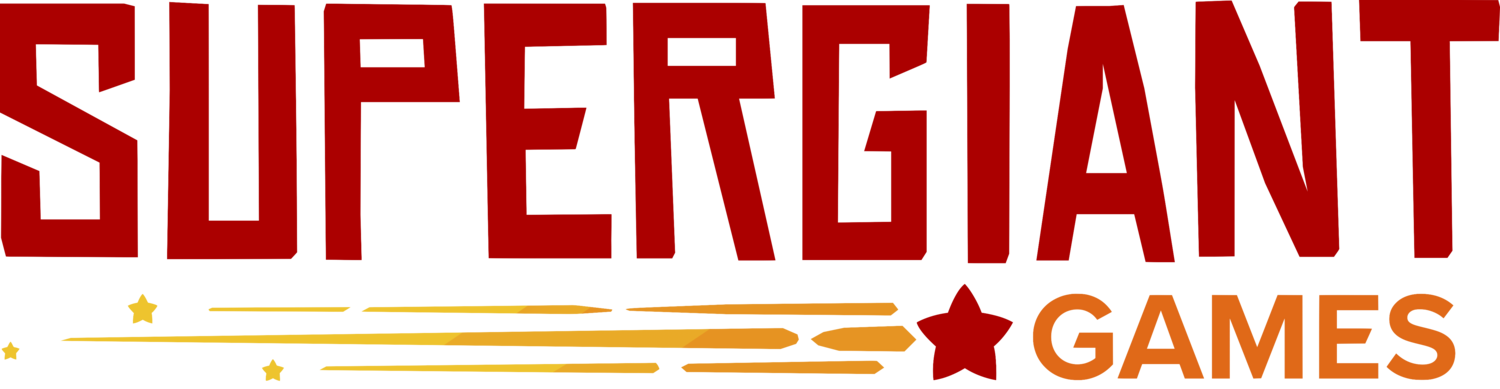
- Logo since August 2019
- Type: Private
- Industry: Video games
- Founded: 2009; 17 years ago
- Founders: Amir Rao; Gavin Simon
- Headquarters: San Francisco, California, U.S.
- Key people: Amir Rao (studio operations)
- Products: Bastion; Transistor; Pyre; Hades; Hades II
- Number of employees: 25 (2025)
- Website: supergiantgames.com

Supergiant Games, LLC is an American independent video game developer and publisher based in San Francisco. It was founded in 2009 by Amir Rao and Gavin Simon, and is known for the games Bastion, Transistor, Pyre, Hades and Hades II.

== History ==
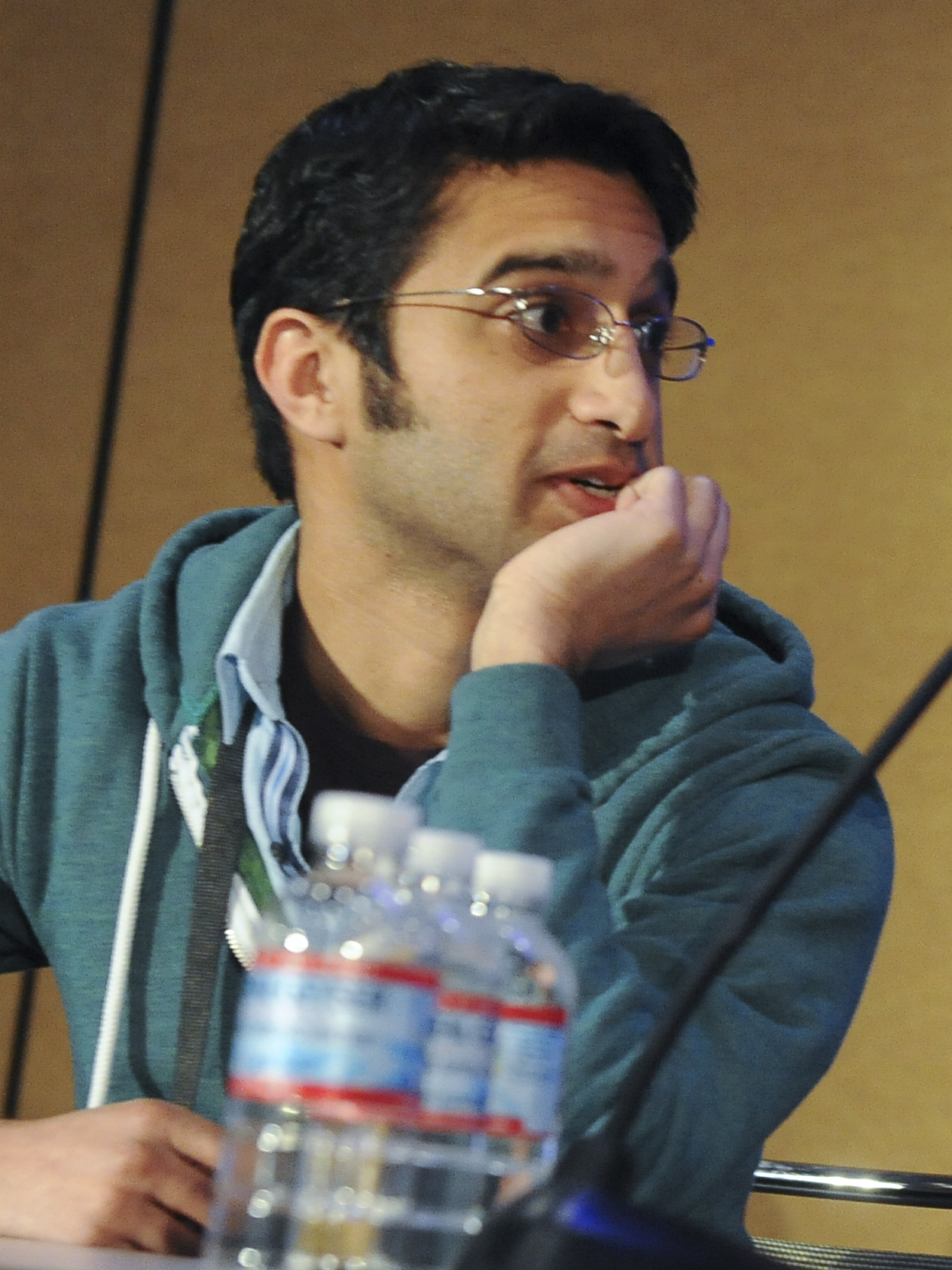
Amir Rao, co-founder of Supergiant Games, in 2012

Supergiant Games was formed in 2009 by Amir Rao and Gavin Simon, both previously of EA Los Angeles, where they were involved with the Command & Conquer series. After agreeing to leave Electronic Arts, the duo moved into the same house, and began to work on a new game together. Artist Jen Zee became Supergiant's third member, and, later, its art director. Musician and composer Darren Korb was hired for audio and music work. All told, the company had only seven permanent staff in 2009, all of whom are still with Supergiant as of 2025. The studio employed a number of freelance programmers and developers at various times during the development of their first game.

Their first game, Bastion, received high critical praise, being listed among several "Game of the Year" lists from game journalists. It was first shown in mid-development at the 2010 Penny Arcade Expo as one of many highlighted indie games. This attracted several publishers who wanted to help distribute the game; Supergiant chose Warner Bros. Interactive Entertainment, leading to the game's distribution on Xbox Live Arcade and also as a premiere title during the 2011 "Summer of Arcade" promotion.

In March 2013, Supergiant announced its next title, Transistor, released on May 20, 2014. A promotion video was released on March 19. The game's protagonist, Red, is a singer in the cyberpunk city of Cloudbank who loses her voice and her bodyguard in a traumatic incident but gains a powerful USB-like sword. The game features a similar isometric viewpoint to Bastion and was also met with critical acclaim.

In April 2016, the studio announced its third game, Pyre, released on July 25, 2017, for Microsoft Windows, Linux and PlayStation 4. It was described as a party-based role-playing game. In a break from its previous games, Pyre does not use an isometric viewpoint; the player's party travels across a 2D overworld, and combat takes place in a separate arena. The combat system is also very different, being described as "fantasy basketball" with which the victors of games called Rites can receive absolution for past crimes and return from their exile in a wasteland called the Downfall to their country of origin, the Commonwealth. Pyre was again regarded fondly by critics and was named Game Informer's best indie RPG for that year.

Supergiant's next game, Hades, was revealed at The Game Awards 2018 and released on September 17, 2020, following an early access release from December 2018. Hades is an action roguelike game based on Greek mythology, where the playable character Zagreus uses a combination of weapons, magic, and abilities to defeat enemies in procedurally-generated dungeons and escape from his father, Hades. Hades was met with critical acclaim, selling over 1 million copies and reaching "universal acclaim" status on Metacritic, with several awards won. It was nominated for nine awards at The Game Awards 2020, including for Game of the Year; Hades would end up winning two awards for Best Independent Game and Best Action. Hades wound up winning the Game of the Year awards at the 17th British Academy Games Awards, the 24th Annual D.I.C.E. Awards, and the 21st Game Developers Choice Awards.

At The Game Awards 2022, Supergiant announced Hades II. Like the original Hades, it is a roguelite game based on Greek mythology and it was available in early access during its development from May 6, 2024, until its official release. The game's protagonist is Melinoë, daughter of Hades and younger sister of previous protagonist Zagreus, who has been raised by the witch Hecate to take down the Titan Chronos after his attack on Melinoë's family left them imprisoned and unreachable. Hades II was released on September 25, 2025, and was met with similar praise as Hades.

== Games developed ==
Year	Title	Platform(s)	Genre(s)
2011	Bastion	Windows, macOS, Linux, PlayStation 4, PlayStation Vita, Switch, Xbox 360, Xbox One, iOS	Action role-playing
2014	Transistor	Windows, macOS, Linux, PlayStation 4, Switch, iOS, Apple TV	Action role-playing, turn-based strategy
2017	Pyre	Windows, macOS, Linux, PlayStation 4	Action role-playing, sports
2020	Hades	Windows, macOS, Switch, Xbox One, Xbox Series X/S, PlayStation 4, PlayStation 5, iOS	Action role-playing, roguelike
2025	Hades II	Windows, macOS, Switch, Switch 2, PlayStation 5, Xbox Series X/S	Action role-playing, roguelike
