= Greg Kasavin =

American video game writer

Gregory A. Kasavin
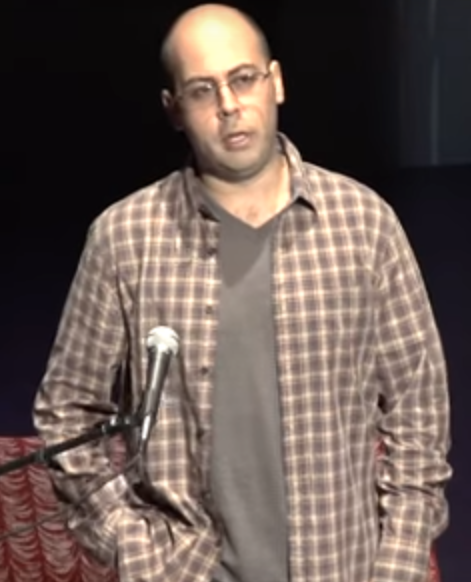
- Kasavin in 2013
- Born: August 21, 1977 (age 49); Moscow, Russian SFSR, Soviet Union
- Occupations: Video game designer; writer
- Employer: Supergiant Games
- Known for: Bastion, Transistor, Pyre, Hades

Gregory A. Kasavin (/kəˈsɑːvɪn/; born August 21, 1977) is an American video game writer and designer at Supergiant Games. Before entering game development, Kasavin was the site director and executive editor at the gaming news website GameSpot for over ten years.

== Career ==
Prior to working at GameSpot, he worked on Newtype Gaming Magazine. Kasavin also ran a small website called Arcadia Magazine, which reviewed video games and films, and eventually led to his internship at GameSpot. He joined GameSpot in November 1996. On January 3, 2007, GameSpot announced Kasavin's resignation from his position as editor-in-chief. Kasavin worked for Electronic Arts' Los Angeles Studio as associate producer for the PC version of Command & Conquer 3: Tiberium Wars and as a producer for Command & Conquer: Red Alert 3 and its expansion Uprising. While working for EA-LA he hosted a program called Command School, part of Command & Conquer TV, which helps players gain experience at C&C games. He later took a position at 2K Games working as a publishing producer on Spec Ops: The Line.

Kasavin is working at Supergiant Games, and was the writer and creative director of Bastion, Transistor, Pyre, and Hades.
