= Glitch (Minnesota company) =

American video game and software development company

GLITCH
- Type: Private
- Industry: Video Games; Software Development
- Founded: 2010
- Founder: Evva Karr; Nicolaas VanMeerten
- Headquarters: Minneapolis–Saint Paul Minnesota, US
- Area served: Worldwide
- Number of employees: 11
- Website: heyglitch.com

Glitch SBC, stylized as GLITCH, is an American software and video game development company based in Minneapolis, Minnesota specializing in original titles, player insights and the publishing of indie games. GLITCH was founded in 2013 by Evva Karr and Nicolaas VanMeerten. Karr previously worked in publishing and strategic partnerships for Riot Games and Activision Blizzard Media Network.

The collective finances prototypes from early stage game studios with $120,000-$250,000 USD equity checks through the Moonrise Fund, and attempts to raise $10,000 Galaxy Grants for projects from emerging game developers. The company began co-developing and publishing indie games with the release of Optica in 2018 and HyperDot in 2020. As of January 2022, GLITCH employs 11 people.

== History ==
=== Founding and initial development (2013–2022) ===
Evva Karr and Nicolaas VanMeerten began GLITCH as a student group while attending the University of Minnesota Twin Cities. Karr and VanMeerten bootstrapped the studio by making white-labeled games, producing work for companies like PBS, Disney, and Warner Brothers to avoid bringing in investors.

GLITCH partnered with Charles McGregor of Tribe Games in 2019 with the co-development and publishing of their first title, HyperDot. HyperDot was released on video game consoles and Steam in 2020 as a timed-exclusive on Microsoft Xbox. It received critical praise, being nominated at the 2020 Game Awards for its Innovation in Accessibility. As of January 2022, the game has been played by over 800,000 people world-wide.

Following the success with HyperDot, GLITCH launched both the Moonrise Fund and Galaxy Grants to back early stage game studios and prototype grants for game developers. The Moonrise Fund supports prototypes from early stage game studios with $120,000 - US$250,000 equity checks. The Galaxy Grant provides US$10,000 checks to emerging game developers. GLITCH cited the challenges for independent game developers in early production and access to actionable insights as primary reasons for launching the funds.

In June 2021, GLITCH announced Future of Play Direct, a digital festival streaming on the Twitch Gaming channel as a part of Geoff Keighley's Summer Game Fest. A second Direct was broadcast live during the 2021 Game Awards pre-show. The two showcases featured titles from over forty studios worldwide.

==== Moonrise Fund ====
The Moonrise Fund is an early-stage equity fund that pools together various studio investors’ capital in order to back game studios creating new modes of play. The Moonrise Fund is backed by a board of advisors, who provide insights on development, marketing, and publishing. The fund's advisory board includes former Paradox Interactive COO and co-founder of Aldeon, Susana Meza Graham, Unknown Worlds Entertainment, the developers of the Subnautica series, InnerSloth, the developers of Among Us, Chandana Ekanayake of Outerloop Games, Saleem Dabbous of KO-OP, Sunni Pavlovic of Yacht Club Games, Felix Kramer of The Game Band, and Zhengua Yang of Serenity Forge.

Three studios were announced as recipients of the fund in 2021; this included co-op studio Future Club, known for its work on titles such as fighting game Skullgirls and RPG platformer Indivisible; Virtuoso Neomedia, developer of Raddminton, Killer Auto, and Zodiac XX; and Perfect Garbage, the studio behind cyberpunk visual novel Love Shore.

==== Founder's Kit ====
GLITCH launched the Founder's Kit in 2020 to provide knowledge sharing resources for startup studios and game developers. It is a collection of public notes and tool kits contributed by various studios from around the world. It contains three sections: Pacts, Covenants, & Treaties, which includes templates of actual documents such as mutual NDAs, contractor deals, and founder's agreements for developer's reference; Business Structures, which lists the information intended to help developers identify an optimal business structure in the context of their goals; and Pitch Decks, a curated collection of presentations from game creators and the outcomes of each sample. This collection contains pitch decks from games like Bioshock, Diablo, and Backbone.

==== Future of Play Direct ====
GLITCH launched its first digital festival in June 2021, streaming on the Twitch Gaming channel during Geoff Keighley's Summer Game Fest. The company produced a showcase inspired by Adult Swim's late-night television programming block Toonami, highlighting creators and new modes of play. GLITCH collaborated with 3D artist Sakura Rabbit to design and build android Vtuber, Melios, to host the show. The twenty minute segment showcased games from twenty studios, including Among Us developers, Innersloth, Lethal League developers, Team Reptile, Future Club, a new studio formed by a team of Former Lab Zero employees, and Umurangi Generation developers, ORIGAME DIGITAL.

A half-hour long second broadcast of Future of Play Direct launched in December 2021 during The Game Awards pre-show. The Direct showcased a program of newly announced independent projects, trailers, and game updates. Segments included the debut trailer for The Wreck and CURSES, and new trailers for El Paso, Elsewhere, ValiDate: Struggling Singles in Your Area, Hyper Gunsport from Necrosoft Games, Glitchhikers: The Spaces Between, Midautumn, and One More Multiverse.

It also saw the addition of concerts, featuring music from the game's soundtracks. In conjunction with the broadcast, a Steam event ran from December 9 to 16, highlighting all available and upcoming titles from both Directs.

== Games ==
=== Optica ===
GLITCH published the puzzle game Optica in 2018 alongside Graveck, the award-winning game developer and studio behind Strata.

=== HyperDot ===
GLITCH published HyperDot in partnership with developer, Tribe Games, in January 2020. The game implemented a wide variety of accessible features. The game supports many different types of controller inputs beyond standard console or PC inputs, from eye-tracking to touch controls to the Xbox Adaptive Controller, and is designed to automatically detect what type of controller is being used. It also includes features such as colorblind mode, two different high-contrast modes, button remapping options, and the ability to disable things such as background animations, controller vibrations, and screen shake.

HyperDot was nominated for the Innovation in Accessibility awards at the 2020 Game Awards, alongside The Last of Us Part 2, Assassin's Creed Valhalla, and Watch Dogs: Legion.
