= HyperDot =

2020 video game

- Developer(s): Tribe Games
- Publisher(s): Glitch
- Producer(s): Charles McGregor; Evva Karr; Nicolaas VanMeerten; Holly Harrison; Sarah Huisken; Rae Hushian; Katie Simning
- Designer(s): Charles McGregor
- Programmer(s): Charles McGregor
- Platform(s): Windows; MacOS; Linux; Xbox
- Release: January 31, 2020
- Genre(s): Action
- Mode(s): Single-player, multiplayer

HyperDot is a minimalistic action video game where the goal is to dodge everything. Players control a dot in a circular arena, and must dodge a variety of enemies until time runs out. It features a single-player campaign mode, multiplayer battles and a level editor where players can build custom challenges.

The game was released on Windows and MacOS in 2020 and was nominated for the Innovation in Accessibility award at The Game Awards that same year. HyperDot is the debut title of developer, Tribe Games.

== Gameplay ==
A level featured in the campaign mode.

HyperDot is a minimal action arcade game that allows players to dodge their way through over 100 hand-crafted levels and trials in the single-player campaign or multiplayer mode. The game is presented with a unique aesthetic, providing a new palette of colors, lights and shapes with each level. The game features a custom level editor. The games provides extensive gameplay customization, with more than 1 million enemy, arena, and modifier combinations with unlimited possibilities to create one-of-a-kind levels.

HyperDot's gameplay options for players include high contrast and colorblind modes, full gameplay integration with the Xbox Adaptive Controller and eye-tracking, and a suite of features optimized for accessibility. The developer created the framework of the game with the idea of people using different controllers in mind. This framework allows the player to use any type of controller to play HyperDot. The game's full key customization includes the capability to utilize Tobii Eye Tracking software for players with limited range of motion. HyperDot's control scheme additionally translates to all actions being performed through the mouse; players can guide their dot throughout levels by moving their cursor.

== Development ==
Minnesota-based Charles McGregor is the sole game developer at Tribe Games, managing the art, music, programming, and design of HyperDot. McGregor worked alongside publishing partner Glitch.

McGregor began building games on a Dell XP and learned how to code as a child, later designing and programming games for class assignments as an undergrad at the University of Minnesota Duluth.

HyperDot's publishing partner, Glitch, led in GameUX, marketing, and business development, while providing technical support during production.

=== Accessibility ===
McGregor enlisted Glitch, as a joint effort between player insights, production, and marketing, and accessibility consultant Cherry Rae Thompson, to foster an inclusive development process. Through #HyperDotA11y, a research campaign, the team worked with disabled players to ensure HyperDot launched with as few barriers as possible. The program was designed to partner with disabled content creators who would stream the game from their homes, and then give feedback on their experiences with the game. After the streams, the team would meet to discuss what they learned, and would prioritize and implement solutions based on the participants’ responses.

Holly Harrison, Glitch's marketing manager and HyperDotA11y researcher, said to Xbox Wire, "our goal is to carve out a little more space for people who don't fit the mainstream image of who plays video games."

HyperDot partnered with disabled content creators to stream the game and discuss their experiences, then used their feedback to identify difficulties and address them with updates. The campaign included the participation of creators, including Steve Saylor, the Canadian game critic, accessibility consultant, and COO of AbleGamers.

Glitch's co-founder and director of insights, Nicolaas VanMeerten, has said that the publisher's contributions, including conducting accessibility research, were to ensure "that the features [McGregor] made resonate with people.

== Soundtrack ==
HyperDot

Soundtrack album by Charles McGregor
- Released: 2020
- Genre: Video game soundtrack
- Length: 42:14

The HyperDot soundtrack consists of 14 original compositions by Charles McGregor. The soundtrack was released on Apple Music, YouTube Music and Spotify on March 10, 2020.

== Release ==
HyperDot was released on January 31, 2020 on Windows and MacOS. It was later released on April 30, 2020 for Xbox One, including Xbox Game Pass subscribers.

== Reception ==
HyperDot received positive reviews from critics upon release. Harold Goldberg, of The Washington Post, wrote that the game was "easy to learn, but maddeningly cerebrum-busting to master. I survived 13.2 seconds — even after multiple tries. But I didn't want to stop indulging".

The game has been celebrated for its advancement in accessibility, earning rave reviews from disabled players for its revolutionary gameplay features.

HyperDot was nominated at The Game Awards in 2020 for Innovation in Accessibility alongside The Last of Us Part II, Assassin's Creed Valhalla, Grounded and Watch Dogs: Legion.

Year	Award	Category	Result
2020	The Game Awards	Innovation in Accessibility	Nominee
2020	IGN	Noteworthy Advancement in Accessibility Nominee	Nominee
