= The Game Awards 2020 =

American video game awards

- Date: December 10, 2020
- Location: Los Angeles (Note: The show was broadcast virtually due to the COVID-19 pandemic, with musical performances taking place in London, Tokyo, and Seattle.)
- Hosted by: Geoff Keighley
- Preshow host: Sydnee Goodman

Highlights
- Most awards: The Last of Us Part II (7)
- Most nominations: The Last of Us Part II (11)
- Game of the Year: The Last of Us Part II
- Website: thegameawards.com

Online coverage
- Runtime: 2 hours, 50 minutes
- Viewership: 83 million
- Produced by: Geoff Keighley · Kimmie Kim
- Directed by: Richard Preuss

The Game Awards 2020 was an award show that honored the best video games of 2020. It was produced and hosted by Geoff Keighley, and took place on December 10, 2020. The preshow ceremony was hosted by Sydnee Goodman. Unlike previous Game Awards, the show was broadcast virtually due to the COVID-19 pandemic; Keighley presented at a soundstage in Los Angeles, while musical performances took place virtually at stages in London and Tokyo. The show introduced the award's first Future Class, a list of individuals from the video game industry who best represent the future of video games, Innovation in Accessibility award, an award for games that featured notable accessibility options. The show was live streamed across 45 different platforms. It featured musical performances from the London Philharmonic Orchestra (Note: Conducted by Lorne Balfe) and Eddie Vedder, and presentations from celebrity guests, including Reggie Fils-Aimé, Gal Gadot, Brie Larson, and Keanu Reeves.

The Last of Us Part II received eleven nominations and seven wins—the most in the show's history to date (Note: The Last of Us Part II's eleven nomination record was tied by God of War Ragnarök at the Game Awards 2022 and beaten by Clair Obscur: Expedition 33's thirteen nominations in 2025. Its seven win record was beaten by Clair Obscur: Expedition 33's nine wins in 2025.)—and was awarded Game of the Year. Neil Druckmann and Halley Gross won Best Narrative for their work on the game, while Laura Bailey was awarded Best Performance for her role as Abby. Several new games were announced, including Ark II, Perfect Dark, and an untitled Mass Effect game. The show was the most expensive ceremony to date. It was viewed by over 83 million streams, the most in its history to date, (Note: The viewership record was beaten in 2021 with 85 million streams.) with 8.3 million concurrent viewers at its peak. It received a mixed reception from media publications, with praise directed at new game announcements, and criticism for not allowing developers more time to speak. Some critics and viewers shared concerns over the success of The Last of Us Part II due to its developer's crunch practices.

== Background ==
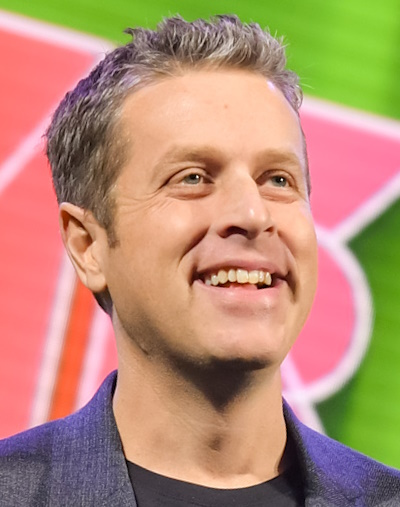
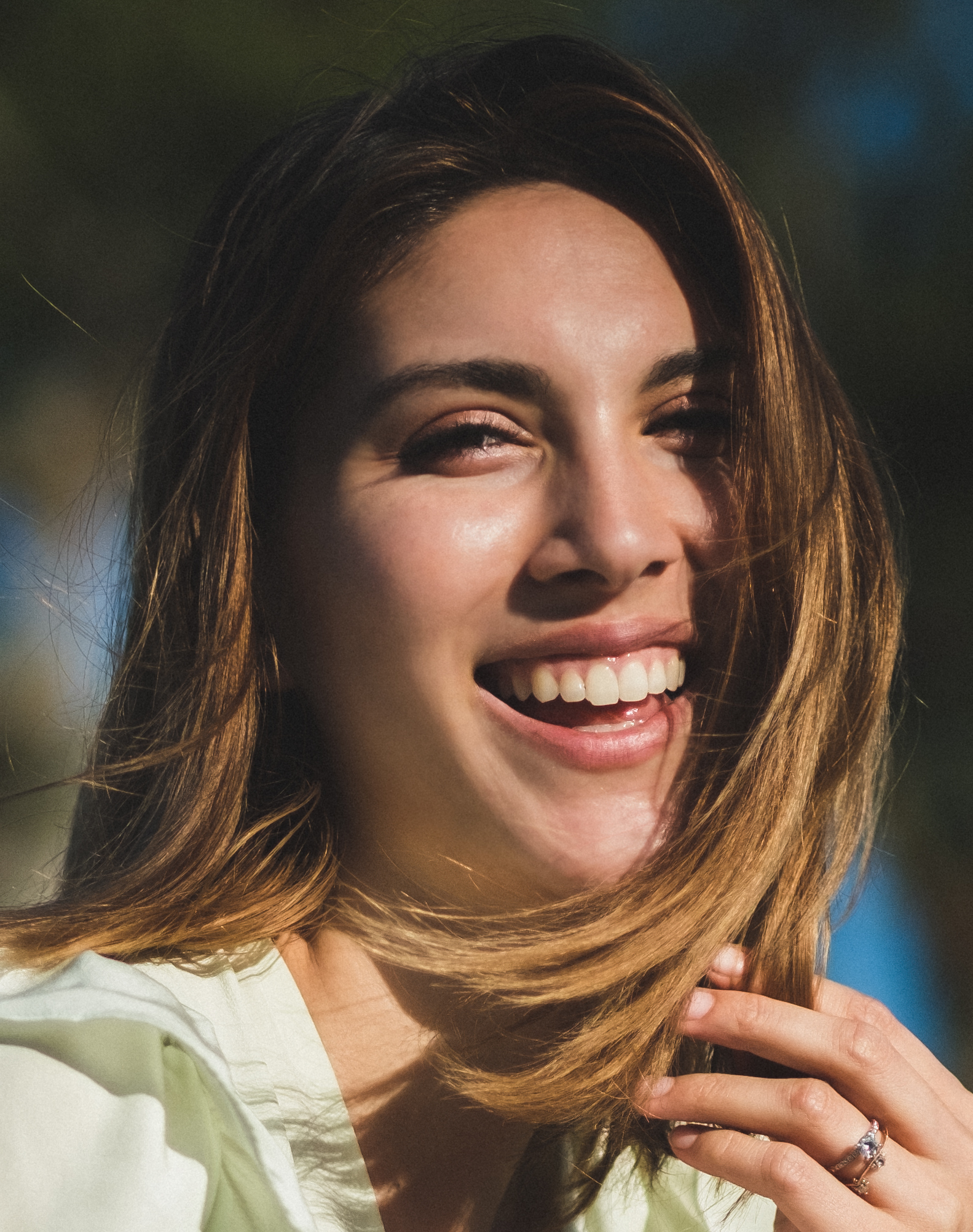
As with the previous iteration of The Game Awards, Geoff Keighley (left) hosted the main show while Sydnee Goodman (right) hosted the preshow.

As with previous iterations of The Game Awards, the 2020 show was hosted and produced by Canadian games journalist Geoff Keighley. He returned as an executive producer alongside Kimmie Kim, and Richard Preuss and LeRoy Bennett returned as director and creative director, respectively. Sydnee Goodman returned as host of the preshow. Due to the COVID-19 pandemic, Keighley did not want to host a normal ceremony. Not wanting to take a hiatus and inspired by the success of Summer Game Fest, he considered hosting from his home but his board urged him to attempt a larger show on par with previous years. In case of a significant surge of COVID-19 cases in California, the crew had several back-up plans, including broadcasting from Keighley's house. He worked with his partners to develop a virtual show; he and his team took inspiration from other shows throughout the year, including the Democratic National Convention, in which the "audience" was featured on virtual screens, as well as the 72nd Primetime Emmy Awards, wherein the hosts were isolated on stage and the winners accepted via video call.

The presentation used three soundstages in Los Angeles, London, and Tokyo; each had minimal attendees, mostly related to production crew and presenters. Keighley said this allowed them to include additional presentation events as with past shows, as well as explore taking future shows to different venues. The 2020 show—featuring a production of more than 400 people, six of whom are full-time employees—had a budget of under US$10 million and was the most expensive to date, partly due to the COVID-19 tests required for the crew and the worldwide remote camera set-ups. It remained profitable due to revenue from advertisers and sponsors, as well as minor earnings from streaming services. The show's theme was strength and comfort due to the impact of the pandemic. Keighley wanted to implore the theme of unity, given the release of the PlayStation 5 and Xbox Series X/S in November 2020; he cited The Game Awards 2018 as an example of this theme, which had led with Nintendo's Reggie Fils-Aimé, Microsoft's Phil Spencer, and Sony's Shawn Layden sharing the stage. Keighley felt the inclusion of film and television stars was an interesting way to show a wider appreciation for the industry. His team wanted to include Henry Cavill in the show, but he was busy working on The Witcher.

While developing the show, Keighley spoke to hundreds of viewers via Zoom to discuss their own interests, often alongside industry figures like Valve Corporation president Gabe Newell and Epic Games creative director Donald Mustard. As with the previous show, the presentation ran alongside the Game Festival, consisting of playable demos and additional in-game content. The show introduced the award's first Future Class, a list of individuals from across the video game industry who best represent the future of video games. The inductees included industry professionals such as Kinda Funny's Blessing Adeoye Jr., Naughty Dog's Halley Gross, and GameSpot's Kallie Plagge. The presentation was aired on December 10, 2020, live streamed across more than 45 online platforms. It aired on more than ten networks in China, including Bilibili, Douyin, and Huya Live, and on several networks in India including Disney+ Hotstar, JioTV, and MX Player.

=== Announcements ===
Around April and May in 2020, Keighley was worried about a potential lack of game announcements due to the impact of COVID-19 on the industry; however, several developers were able to submit their announcements and trailers for demonstration. Announcements on recently released and upcoming games were made for:

- Among Us
- Back 4 Blood
- Call of Duty: Black Ops Cold War
- Disco Elysium
- Dragon Age 4
- Fall Guys: Ultimate Knockout
- Fortnite
- Forza Horizon 4
- The Elder Scrolls Online
- It Takes Two
- Microsoft Flight Simulator
- Monster Hunter Rise
- Myst
- Nier Replicant ver.1.22474487139...
- Oddworld: Soulstorm
- Outriders
- Overcooked! All You Can Eat
- Returnal
- Scarlet Nexus
- Scavengers
- Sea of Solitude
- Star Wars: Tales from the Galaxy's Edge
- Super Meat Boy Forever
- Super Smash Bros. Ultimate
- Warhammer 40,000: Darktide
- Warframe

New games announced during the ceremony included:

- Ark II
- The Callisto Protocol
- Century: Age of Ashes
- Crimson Desert
- Endless Dungeon
- Evil Dead: The Game
- Evil West
- F.I.S.T.: Forged In Shadow Torch
- Ghosts 'n Goblins Resurrection
- Just Cause Mobile
- Loop Hero
- Untitled Mass Effect game
- Open Roads
- Perfect Dark
- Road 96
- Season: A Letter to the Future
- Shady Part of Me
- Tchia
- We Are OFK

== Winners and nominees ==
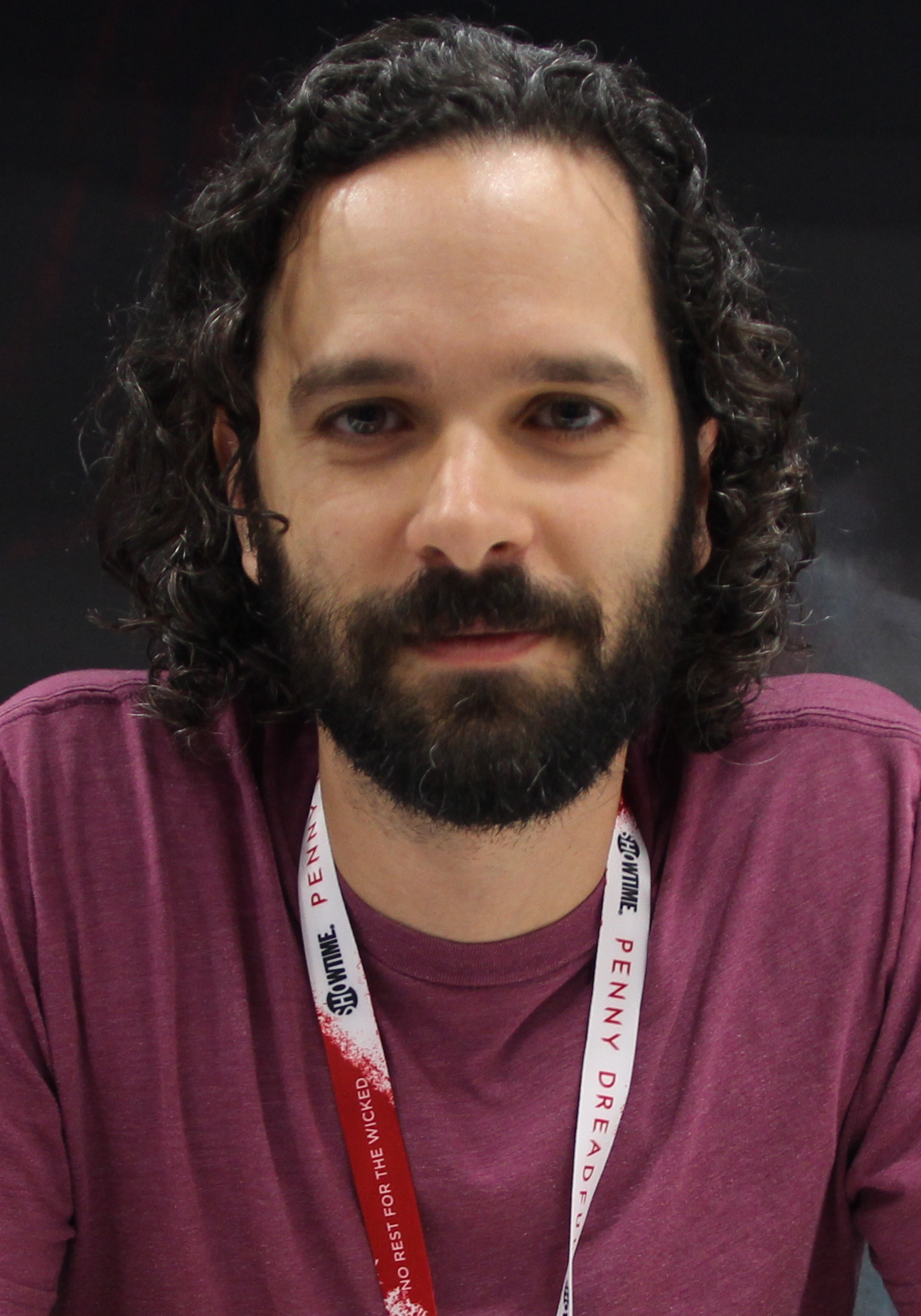
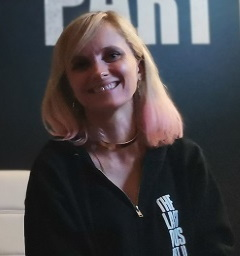
Neil Druckmann and Halley Gross were awarded Best Narrative. Druckmann accepted the awards for Game of the Year and Best Game Direction, and Gross was inducted in Future Class.
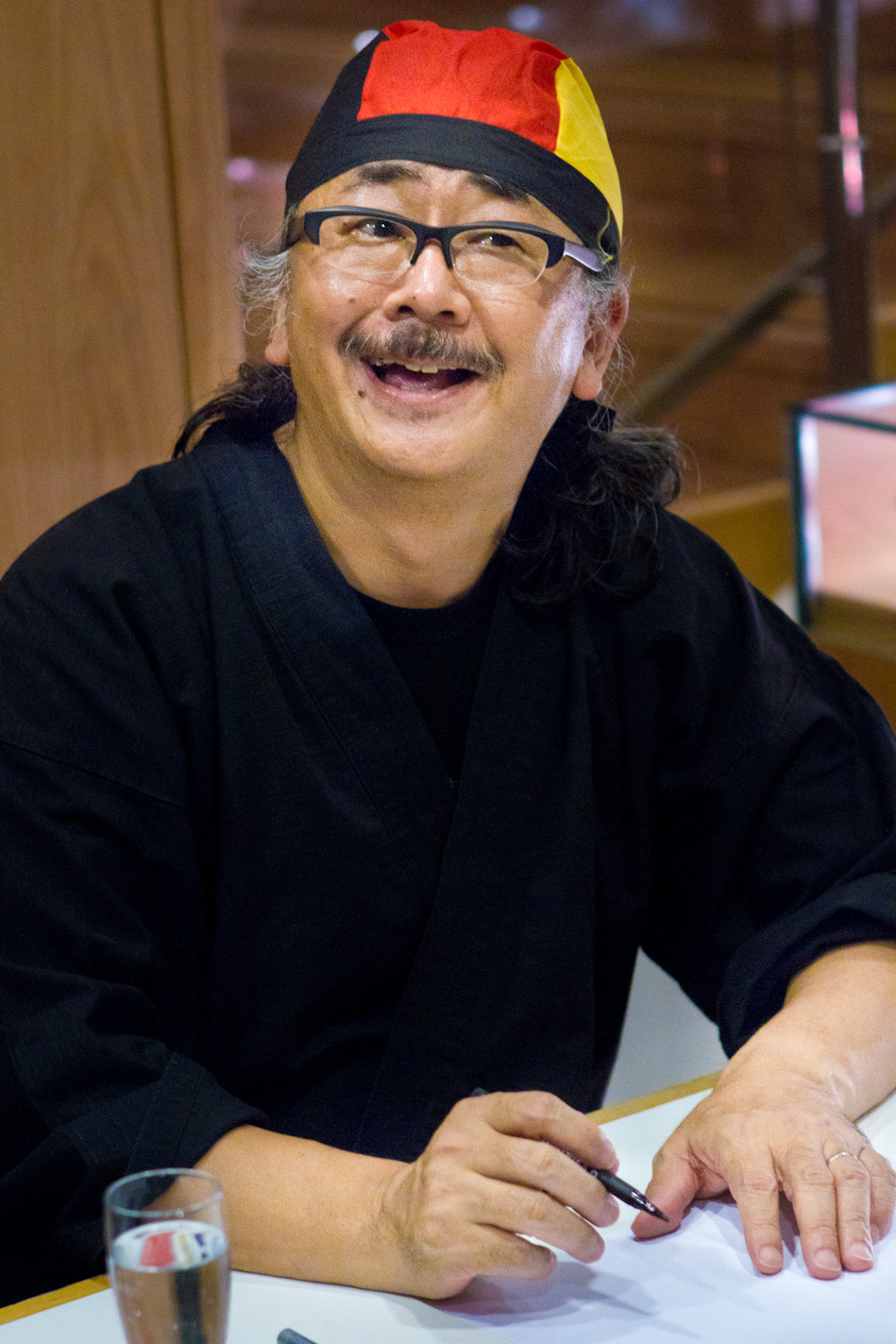
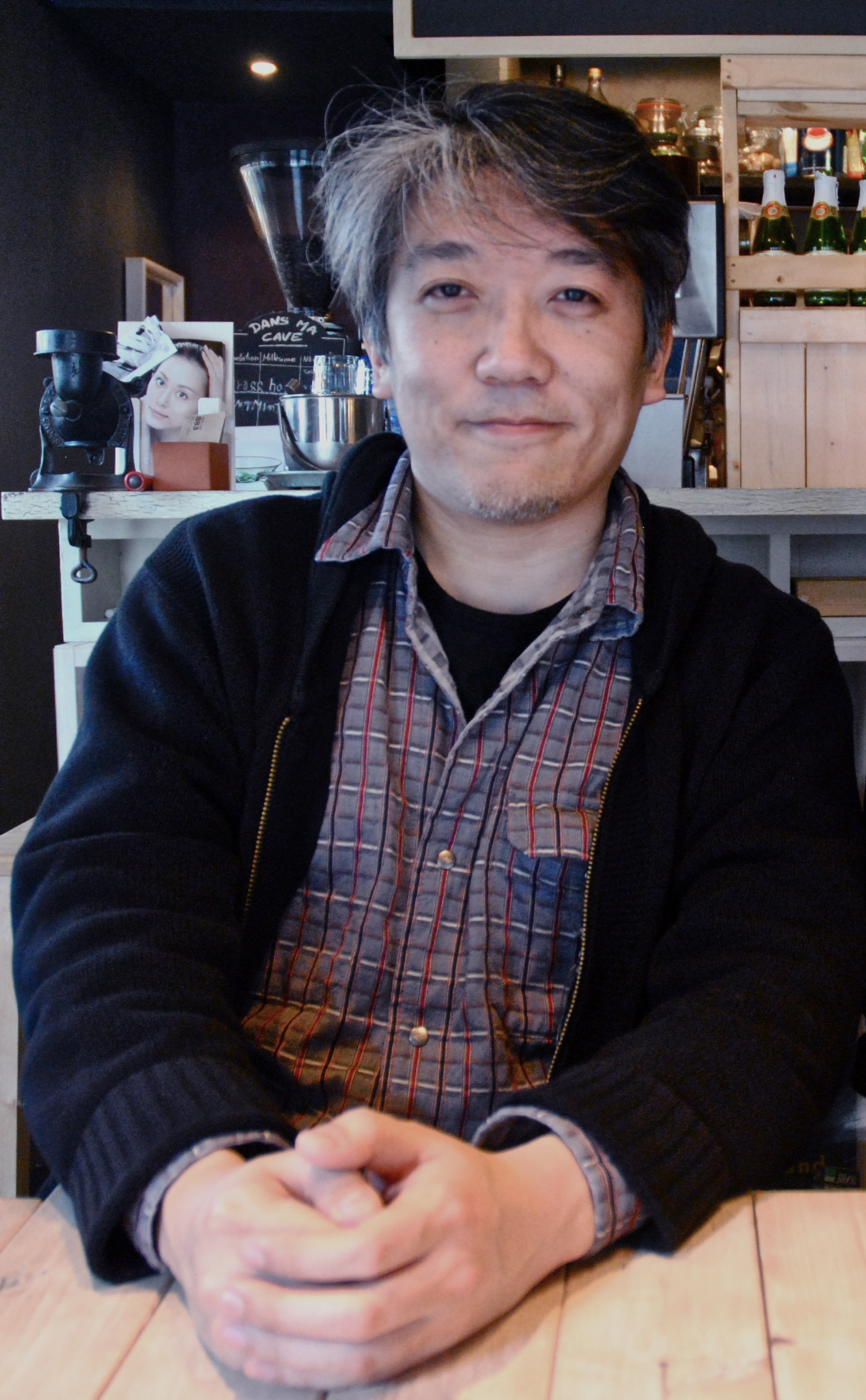
Nobuo Uematsu and Masashi Hamauzu won Best Score and Music alongside Mitsuto Suzuki (not pictured).

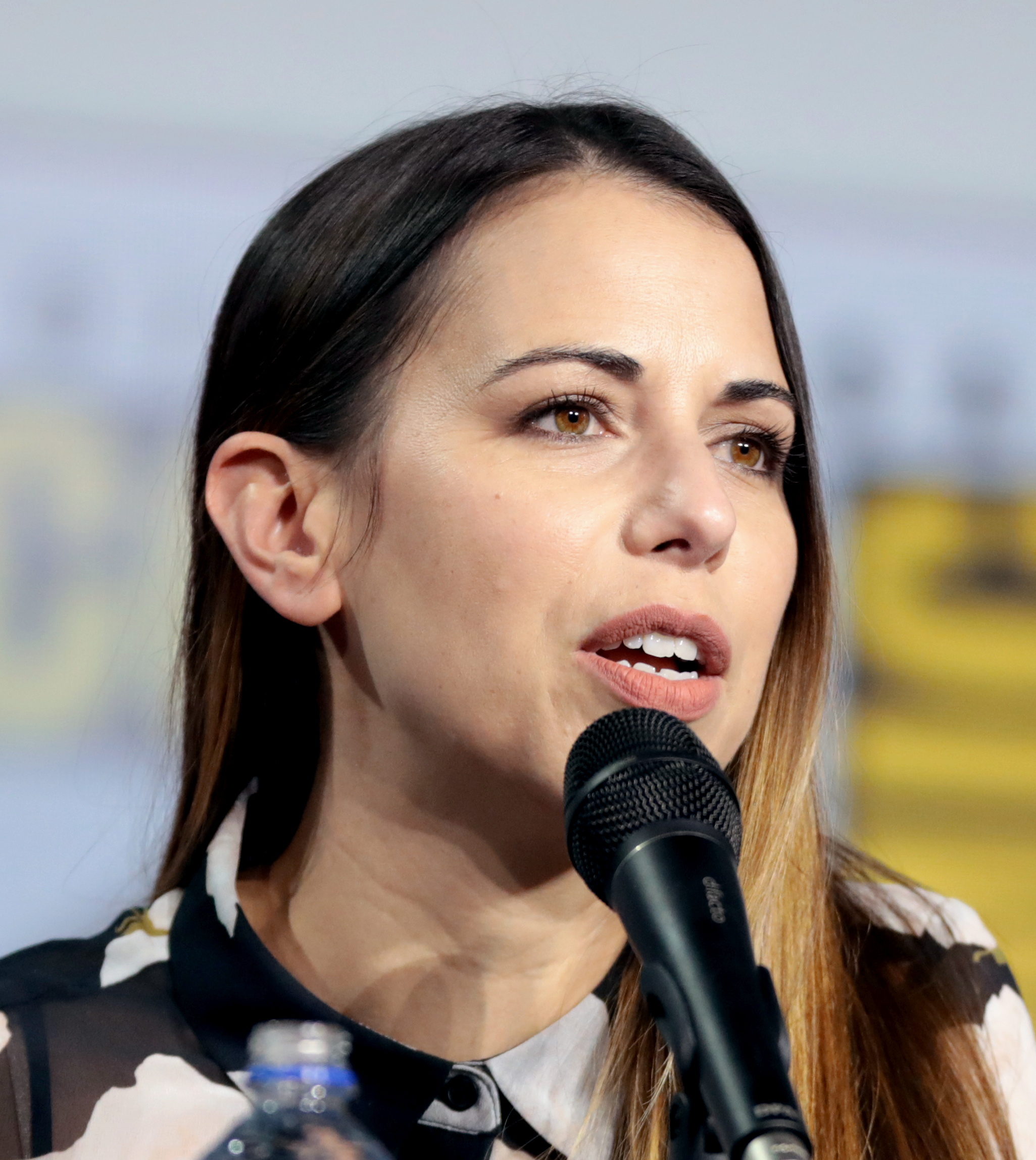
Laura Bailey won Best Performance for her role as Abby in The Last of Us Part II.

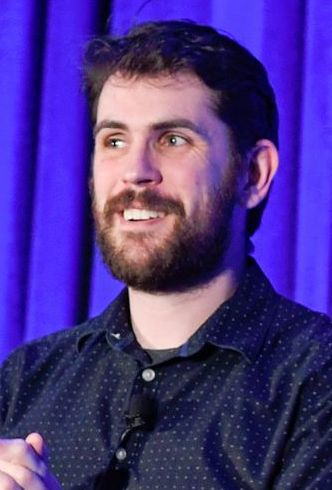
Lead director Sean Murray accepted Best Ongoing Game for No Man's Sky.

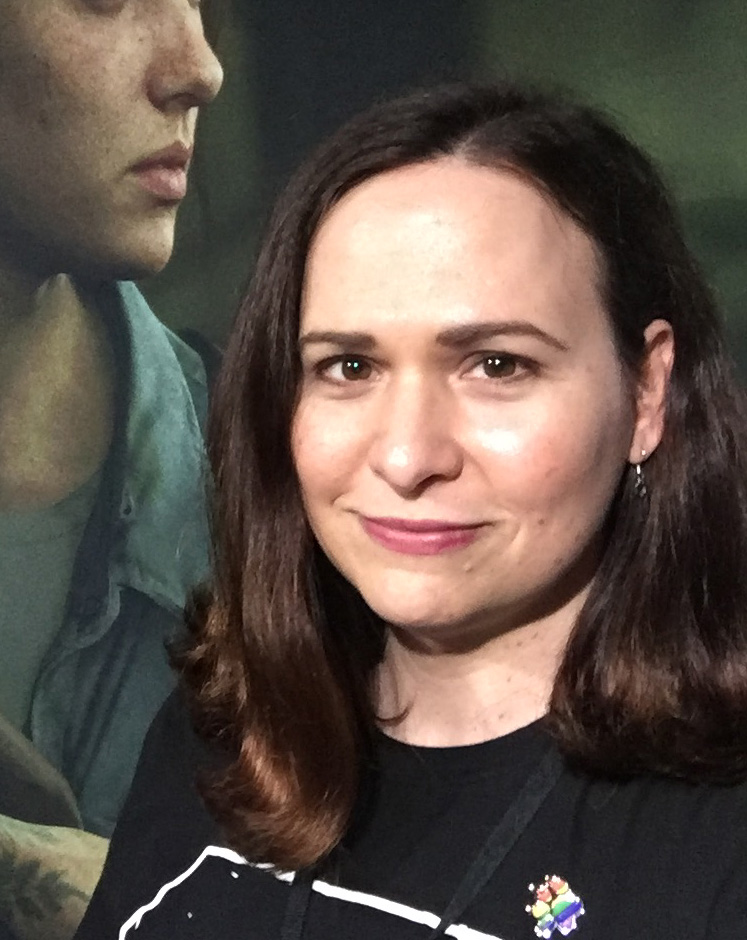
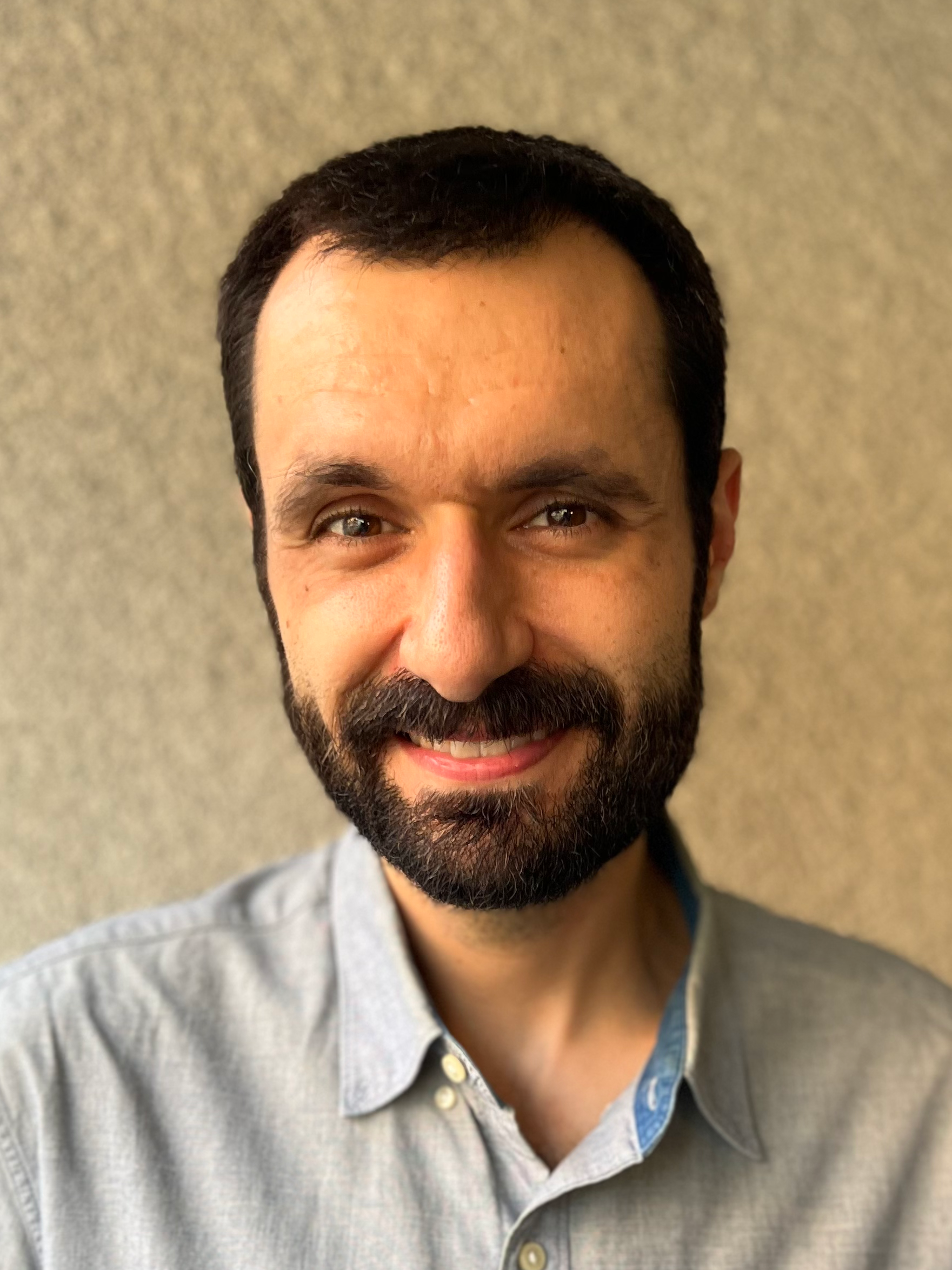
Emilia Schatz and Matthew Gallant accepted Innovation in Accessibility for The Last of Us Part II.

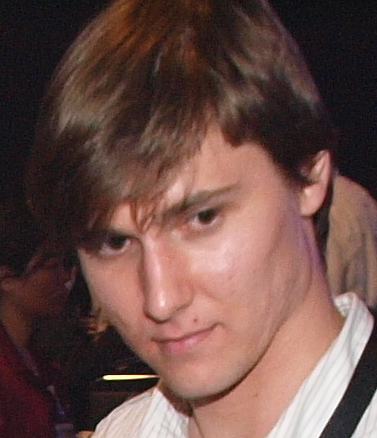
The Last of Us Part II co-game director Kurt Margenau accepted Best Action/Adventure Game.

The nominees for The Game Awards 2020 were announced on November 18, 2020. Any game released on or before November 20, 2020 was eligible for consideration. The nominees were compiled by a jury panel with members from 96 media outlets globally; ballots were sent to outlets on October 29 and due back on November 6, though they had until November 13 to submit updated ballots. Outlets were required to submit three games for each category to determine the nominees. Winners were determined between the jury (90%) and public votes (10%); the latter was held via the official website and on social media platforms such as Facebook and Twitter, and closed on December 9. The two exceptions were the Most Anticipated Game and Player's Voice awards, which were fully nominated and voted-on by the public; the former was determined exclusively on Twitter and announced during the show, and the latter was announced on December 8 after several rounds of voting. A new Innovation in Accessibility award was added for games that featured notable accessibility options. Around 18.3 million people participated in the public vote, doubling from the previous show.

=== Awards ===
Winners are listed first, highlighted in boldface, and indicated with a double dagger (‡).

==== Video games ====
Game of the Year	Best Game Direction
**The Last of Us Part II – Naughty Dog / Sony Interactive Entertainment**‡; Animal Crossing: New Horizons – Nintendo; Doom Eternal – id Software / Bethesda Softworks; Final Fantasy VII Remake – Square Enix; Ghost of Tsushima – Sucker Punch Productions / Sony Interactive Entertainment; Hades – Supergiant Games	**The Last of Us Part II – Naughty Dog / Sony Interactive Entertainment**‡; Final Fantasy VII Remake – Square Enix; Ghost of Tsushima – Sucker Punch Productions / Sony Interactive Entertainment; Hades – Supergiant Games; Half-Life: Alyx – Valve
Best Narrative	Best Art Direction
**The Last of Us Part II – Neil Druckmann and Halley Gross**‡; 13 Sentinels: Aegis Rim – George Kamitani; Final Fantasy VII Remake – Kazushige Nojima, Motomu Toriyama, Hiroaki Iwaki, and Sachie Hirano; Ghost of Tsushima – Ian Ryan, Liz Albl, Patrick Downs, and Jordan Lemos; Hades – Greg Kasavin	**Ghost of Tsushima – Sucker Punch Productions / Sony Interactive Entertainment**‡; Final Fantasy VII Remake – Square Enix; Hades – Supergiant Games; The Last of Us Part II – Naughty Dog / Sony Interactive Entertainment; Ori and the Will of the Wisps – Moon Studios / Xbox Game Studios
Best Score and Music	Best Audio Design
**Final Fantasy VII Remake – Nobuo Uematsu, Masashi Hamauzu, and Mitsuto Suzuki**‡; Doom Eternal – Mick Gordon; Hades – Darren Korb; The Last of Us Part II – Gustavo Santaolalla and Mac Quayle; Ori and the Will of the Wisps – Gareth Coker	**The Last of Us Part II – Naughty Dog / Sony Interactive Entertainment**‡; Doom Eternal – id Software / Bethesda Softworks; Ghost of Tsushima – Sucker Punch Productions / Sony Interactive Entertainment; Half-Life: Alyx – Valve; Resident Evil 3 – Capcom
Best Performance	Games for Impact
**Laura Bailey as Abby – The Last of Us Part II**‡; Logan Cunningham as Hades – Hades; Nadji Jeter as Miles Morales – Spider-Man: Miles Morales; Ashley Johnson as Ellie – The Last of Us Part II; Daisuke Tsuji as Jin Sakai – Ghost of Tsushima	**Tell Me Why – Dontnod Entertainment / Xbox Game Studios**‡; If Found... – Dreamfeel / Annapurna Interactive; Kentucky Route Zero – Cardboard Computer / Annapurna Interactive; Spiritfarer – Thunder Lotus Games; Through the Darkest of Times – Paintbucket Games / HandyGames
Best Ongoing Game	Best Indie Game
**No Man's Sky – Hello Games**‡; Apex Legends – Respawn Entertainment / Electronic Arts; Call of Duty: Warzone – Infinity Ward / Raven Software / Activision; Destiny 2 – Bungie; Fortnite – Epic Games	**Hades – Supergiant Games**‡; Carrion – Phobia Game Studio / Devolver Digital; Fall Guys – Mediatonic / Devolver Digital; Spelunky 2 – Mossmouth; Spiritfarer – Thunder Lotus Games
Best Mobile Game	Best Community Support
**Among Us – Innersloth**‡; Call of Duty: Mobile – TiMi Studios / Activision; Genshin Impact – miHoYo; Legends of Runeterra – Riot Games; Pokémon Café Mix – Genius Sonority / The Pokémon Company	**Fall Guys – Mediatonic / Devolver Digital**‡; Apex Legends – Respawn Entertainment / Electronic Arts; Destiny 2 – Bungie; Fortnite – Epic Games; No Man's Sky – Hello Games; Valorant – Riot Games
Best VR / AR Game	Innovation in Accessibility
**Half-Life: Alyx – Valve**‡; Dreams – Media Molecule / Sony Interactive Entertainment; Iron Man VR – Camouflaj / Sony Interactive Entertainment; Star Wars Squadrons – Motive Studios / Electronic Arts; The Walking Dead: Saints & Sinners – Skydance Interactive	**The Last of Us Part II – Naughty Dog / Sony Interactive Entertainment**‡; Assassin's Creed Valhalla – Ubisoft Montreal / Ubisoft; Grounded – Obsidian Entertainment / Xbox Game Studios; HyperDot – Tribe Games / GLITCH; Watch Dogs Legion – Ubisoft Toronto / Ubisoft
Best Action Game	Best Action/Adventure Game
**Hades – Supergiant Games**‡; Doom Eternal – id Software / Bethesda Softworks; Half-Life: Alyx – Valve; Nioh 2 – Team Ninja; Streets of Rage 4 – Dotemu	**The Last of Us Part II – Naughty Dog / Sony Interactive Entertainment**‡; Assassin's Creed Valhalla – Ubisoft Montreal / Ubisoft; Ghost of Tsushima – Sucker Punch Productions / Sony Interactive Entertainment; Ori and the Will of the Wisps – Moon Studios / Xbox Game Studios; Spider-Man: Miles Morales – Insomniac Games / Sony Interactive Entertainment; Star Wars Jedi: Fallen Order – Respawn Entertainment / Electronic Arts
Best Role Playing Game	Best Fighting Game
**Final Fantasy VII Remake – Square Enix**‡; Genshin Impact – miHoYo; Persona 5 Royal – Atlus / Sega; Wasteland 3 – inXile Entertainment / Deep Silver; Yakuza: Like a Dragon – Ryu Ga Gotoku Studio / Sega	**Mortal Kombat 11: Ultimate Edition – NetherRealm Studios / WB Games**‡; Granblue Fantasy Versus – Arc System Works / Cygames / Xseed Games; One-Punch Man: A Hero Nobody Knows – Spike Chunsoft / Bandai Namco; Street Fighter V Champion Edition – Dimps / Capcom; Under Night In-Birth Exe:Late[cl-r] – French Bread / Arc System Works / Aksys
Best Family Game	Best Sim/Strategy Game
**Animal Crossing: New Horizons – Nintendo**‡; Crash Bandicoot 4: It's About Time – Toys for Bob / Activision; Fall Guys – Mediatonic / Devolver Digital; Mario Kart Live: Home Circuit – Velan Studios / Nintendo; Minecraft Dungeons – Mojang Studios / Xbox Game Studios; Paper Mario: The Origami King – Intelligent Systems / Nintendo	**Microsoft Flight Simulator – Asobo Studio / Xbox Game Studios**‡; Crusader Kings III – Paradox Interactive; Desperados III – Mimimi Games / THQ Nordic; Gears Tactics – Splash Damage / The Coalition / Xbox Game Studios; XCOM: Chimera Squad – Firaxis Games / 2K Games
Best Sports/Racing Game	Best Multiplayer Game
**Tony Hawk's Pro Skater 1 + 2 – Vicarious Visions / Activision**‡; Dirt 5 – Codemasters; F1 2020 – Codemasters; FIFA 21 – EA Vancouver / EA Sports; NBA 2K21 – Visual Concepts / 2K	**Among Us – Innersloth**‡; Animal Crossing: New Horizons – Nintendo; Call of Duty: Warzone – Infinity Ward / Raven Software / Activision; Fall Guys – Mediatonic / Devolver Digital; Valorant – Riot Games
Best Debut Game (Note: Awarded for the best debut game by an indie studio in 2020)	Most Anticipated Game (Note: Voting for this award was held exclusively on Twitter.)
**Phasmophobia – Kinetic Games**‡; Carrion – Phobia Game Studio / Devolver Digital; Mortal Shell – Cold Symmetry / Playstack; Raji: An Ancient Epic – Nodding Heads Games / Super.com; Röki – Polygon Treehouse / United Label	**Elden Ring – FromSoftware / Bandai Namco Entertainment**‡; God of War sequel – Santa Monica Studio / Sony Interactive Entertainment; Halo Infinite – 343 Industries / Xbox Game Studios; Horizon Forbidden West – Guerrilla Games / Sony Interactive Entertainment; The Legend of Zelda: Breath of the Wild sequel – Nintendo; Resident Evil Village – Capcom
Player's Voice (Note: 100% public-voted award that had a three-round nomination process that began with 30 games)
**Ghost of Tsushima – Sucker Punch Productions / Sony Interactive Entertainment**‡; The Last of Us Part II – Naughty Dog / Sony Interactive Entertainment (Note: The Last of Us Part II was runner-up for Player's Voice. Other final placings were not revealed; Keighley updated the results four hours before voting closed: 1. Ghost of Tsushima (47 percent); 2. The Last of Us Part II (33 percent); 3. Hades (11 percent); 4. Doom Eternal (7 percent); 5. Spider-Man: Miles Morales (3 percent)); Doom Eternal – id Software / Bethesda Softworks; Hades – Supergiant Games; Spider-Man: Miles Morales – Insomniac Games / Sony Interactive Entertainment

==== Esports and creators ====
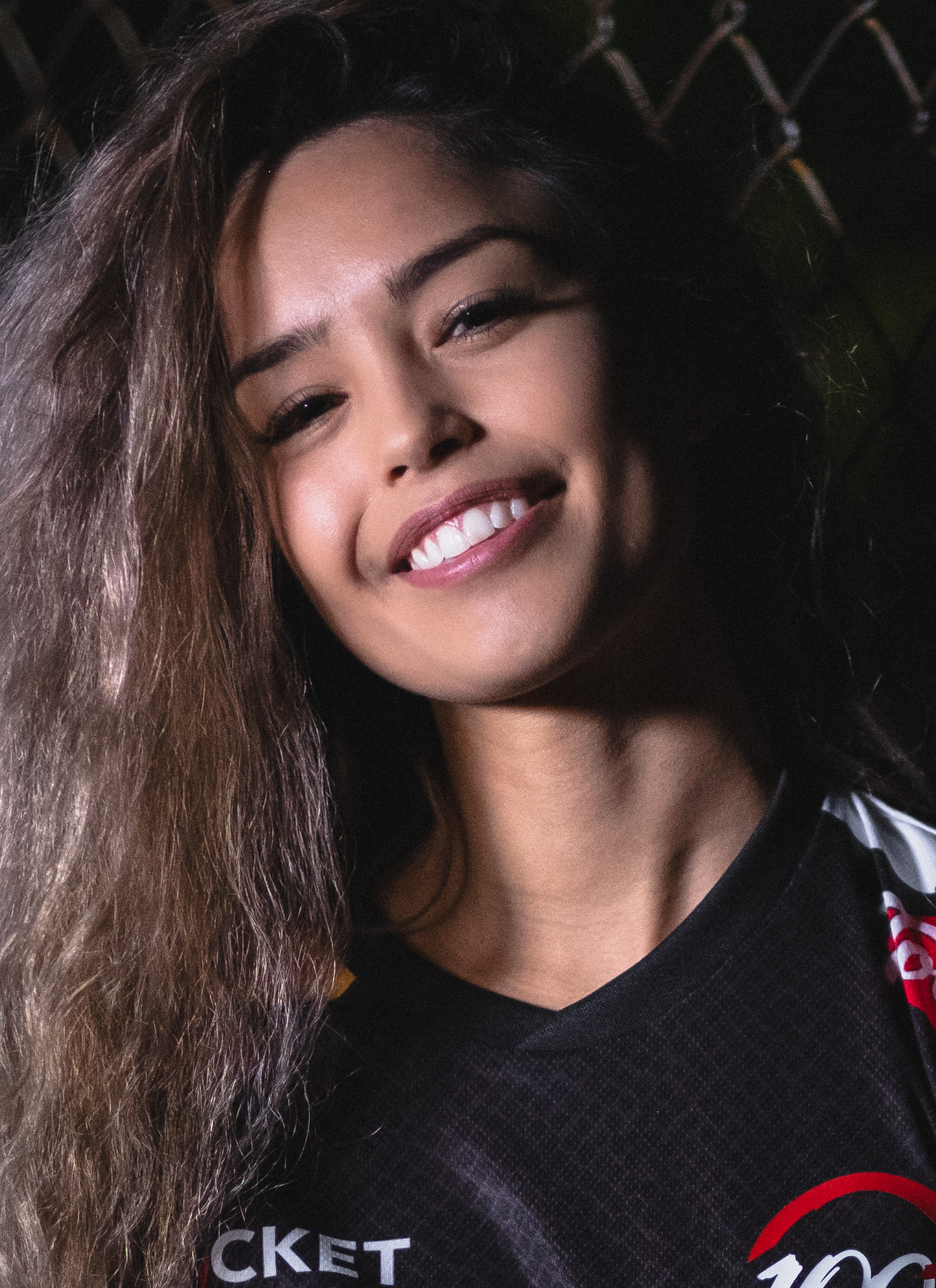
Rachell "Valkyrae" Hofstetter won Content Creator of the Year.

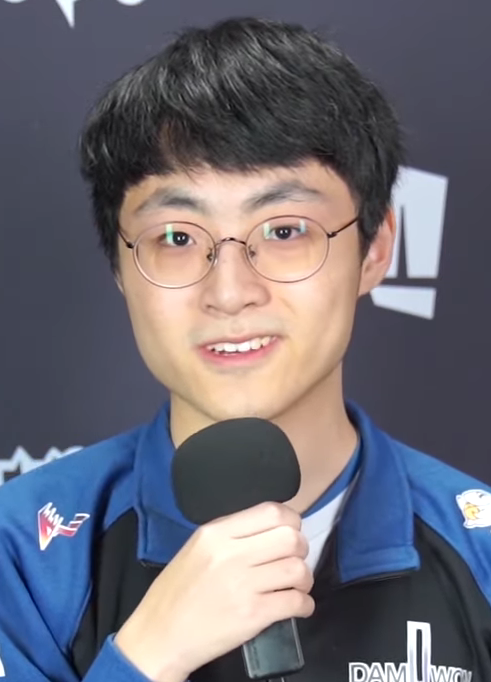
Heo "Showmaker" Su of Damwon Gaming won Best Esports Athlete.

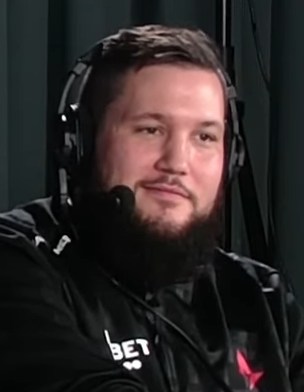
Danny "Zonic" Sørensen of Astralis won Best Esports Coach for the second year in a row.

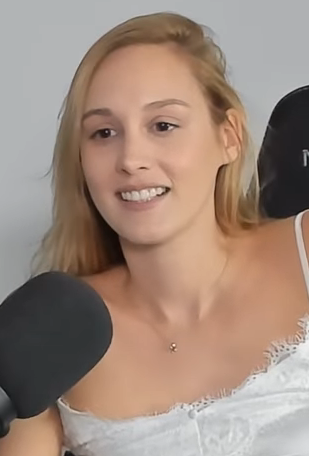
Sjokz won Best Esports Host for the third consecutive year.

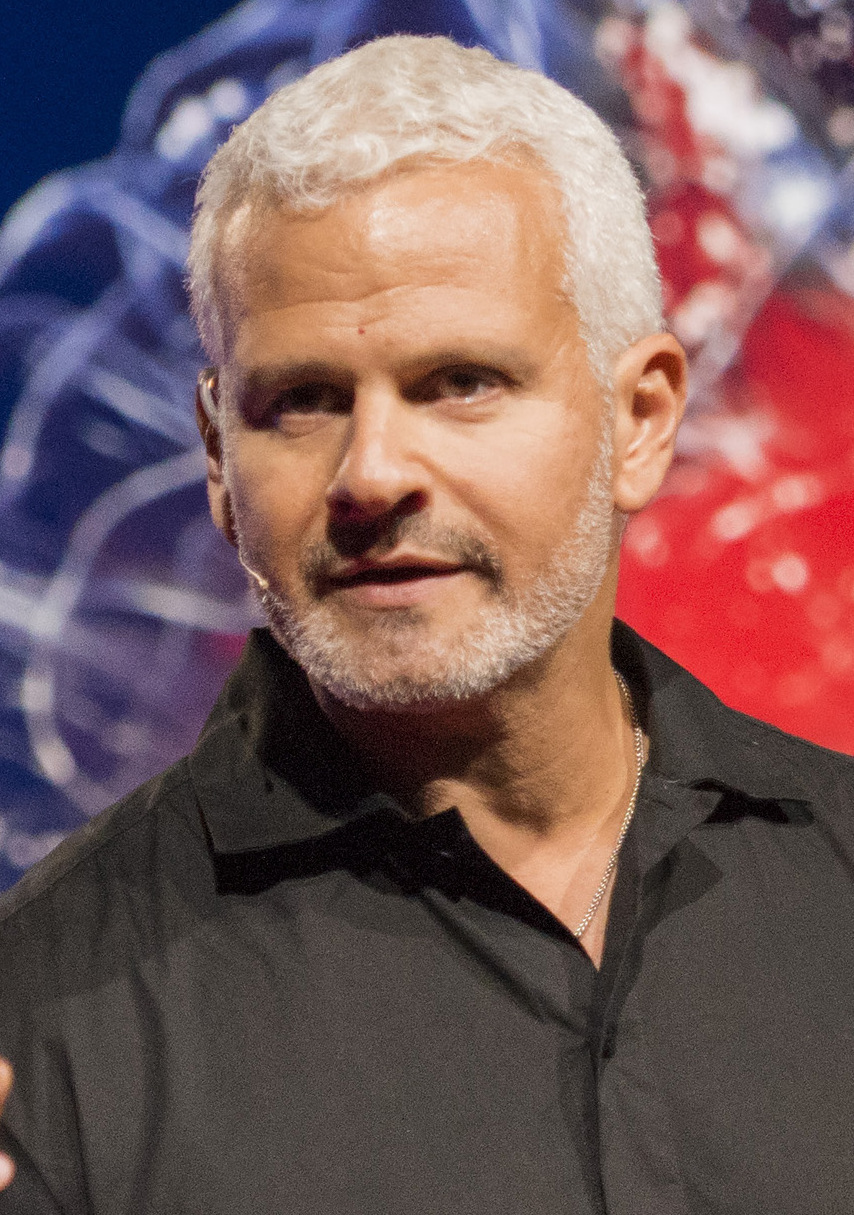
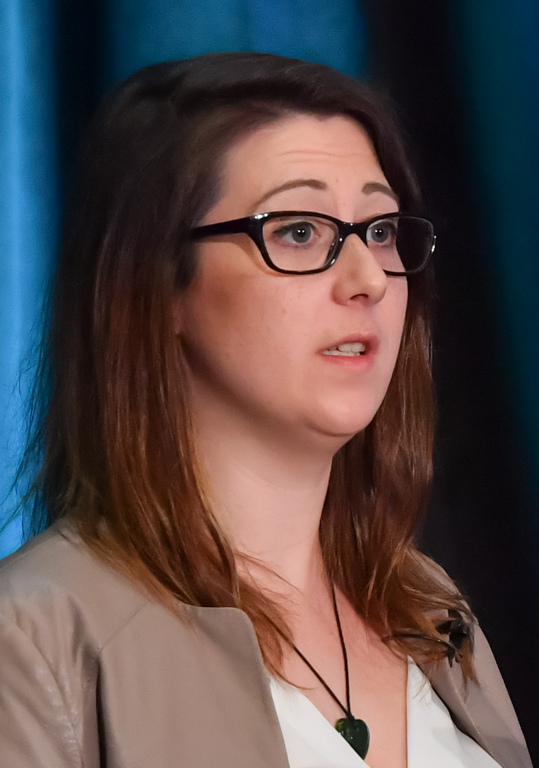
Adam Gazzaley and Jennifer Hazel were named Global Gaming Citizens.

Best Esports Game	Best Esports Athlete
**League of Legends – Riot Games**‡; Call of Duty: Modern Warfare – Infinity Ward / Raven Software / Activision; Counter-Strike: Global Offensive – Valve; Fortnite – Epic Games; Valorant – Riot Games	**Heo "Showmaker" Su (Damwon Gaming, League of Legends)**‡; Anthony "Shotzzy" Cuevas-Castro (Dallas Empire, Call of Duty League); Kim "Canyon" Geon-bu (Damwon Gaming, League of Legends); Matthieu "ZywOo" Herbaut (Team Vitality, Counter-Strike: Global Offensive); Ian "Crimsix" Porter (Dallas Empire, Call of Duty League)
Best Esports Team	Best Esports Coach
**G2 Esports (League of Legends)**‡; Dallas Empire (Call of Duty League); Damwon Gaming (League of Legends); San Francisco Shock (Overwatch League); Team Secret (Dota 2)	**Danny "zonic" Sorensen (Astralis, Counter-Strike: Global Offensive)**‡; Lee "Zefa" Jae-min (T1, League of Legends); Fabian "Grabbz" Lohmann (G2 Esports, League of Legends); Raymond "rambo" Lussier (Dallas Empire, Call of Duty); Dae-hee "Crusty" Park (San Francisco Shock, Overwatch League)
Best Esports Event	Best Esports Host
**2020 League of Legends World Championship (League of Legends)**‡; 2020 Overwatch League Grand Finals (Overwatch); BLAST Premier: Spring 2020 European Finals (Counter-Strike: Global Offensive); Call of Duty League Championship 2020 (Call of Duty: Modern Warfare); IEM Katowice 2020 (Counter-Strike: Global Offensive)	**Eefje "Sjokz" Depoortere**‡; Alex "Goldenboy" Mendez; Alex "Machine" Richardson; James "Dash" Patterson; Jorien "Sheever" van der Heijden
Content Creator of the Year	Global Gaming Citizens (Note: Presented in conjunction with Facebook Gaming)
**Rachell "Valkyrae" Hofstetter**‡; Timothy "TimTheTatman" Betar; Nick "Nickmercs" Kolcheff; Jay-Ann Lopez; Alanah Pearce	Jennifer Hazel; Adam Gazzaley; Latinx in Gaming

=== Games with multiple nominations and awards ===
==== Multiple nominations ====
The Last of Us Part II received eleven nominations, the most in the show's history to date. Other games with multiple nominations included Hades with nine, Ghost of Tsushima with eight, Final Fantasy VII Remake with six, and Doom Eternal with five. Sony Interactive Entertainment had 26 total nominations, more than any other publisher, followed by Supergiant Games and Xbox Game Studios with eight.

Games that received multiple nominations
Nominations	Game
11	The Last of Us Part II
9	Hades
8	Ghost of Tsushima
6	Final Fantasy VII Remake
5	Doom Eternal
4	Fall Guys
4	Half-Life: Alyx
3	Animal Crossing: New Horizons
3	Fortnite
3	Ori and the Will of the Wisps
3	Spider-Man: Miles Morales
3	Valorant
2	Among Us
2	Apex Legends
2	Assassin's Creed Valhalla
2	Call of Duty: Warzone
2	Carrion
2	Destiny 2
2	Genshin Impact
2	No Man's Sky
2	Spiritfarer

Nominations by publisher
Nominations	Publisher
26	Sony Interactive Entertainment
9	Supergiant Games
9	Xbox Game Studios
6	Activision
6	Devolver Digital
6	Nintendo
6	Square Enix
5	Bethesda Softworks
5	Riot Games
5	Valve
4	Electronic Arts
3	Capcom
3	Epic Games
3	Sega
3	Ubisoft
2
2	2K Games
2	Annapurna Interactive
2	Bandai Namco
2	Bungie
2	Codemasters
2	Hello Games
2	Innersloth
2	miHoYo
2	Thunder Lotus Games

==== Multiple awards ====
The Last of Us Part II received the most wins in the show's history to date, with seven. Four games—Among Us, Final Fantasy VII Remake, Ghost of Tsushima, and Hades—won two awards. Across its two winning games, Sony Interactive Entertainment won a total of nine awards, while Innersloth, Square Enix, Supergiant Games, and Xbox Game Studios won two.

Games that received multiple wins
Awards	Game
7	The Last of Us Part II
2	Among Us
2	Final Fantasy VII Remake
2	Ghost of Tsushima
2	Hades

Wins by publisher
Awards	Publisher
9	Sony Interactive Entertainment
2	Innersloth
2	Square Enix
2	Supergiant Games
2	Xbox Game Studios

== Presenters and performers ==
=== Presenters ===
The following individuals, listed in order of appearance, presented awards or introduced trailers. All other awards were presented by Keighley or Goodman.

Name	Role
Rand Miller	Presented the launch trailer for Myst for Oculus Quest
Stephen A. Smith	Presented the award for Best Esports Athlete
Brie Larson	Presented the award for Best Performance
Chris Ashton	Presented the gameplay trailer for Back 4 Blood
Josh Holmes	Presented the beta announcement trailer for Scavengers
Glen Schofield	Presented the reveal trailer for The Callisto Protocol
John David Washington	Presented the award for Best Narrative
Swedish Chef	Presented the Swedish Chef trailer for Overcooked: All You Can Eat
DrLupo	Introduced Future Class
Gal Gadot	Presented the award for Games for Impact
Tom Holland	Introduced presenter Nolan North
Nolan North	Presented the award for Best Multiplayer Game
Ralph Macchio	Presented the award for Best Fighting Game
Yuji Okumoto	Presented the award for Best Fighting Game
Josef Fares	Presented the reveal trailer for It Takes Two
Reggie Fils-Aimé	Presented the award for Innovation in Accessibility
Troy Baker	Introduced performer Eddie Vedder
Jacksepticeye	Presented the award for Content Creator of the Year
Donald Mustard	Presented the Master Chief, Blood Gulch, and The Walking Dead trailers for Fortnite Battle Royale
Kaskade	Presented the Rocket League Season 2 trailer
Keanu Reeves	Presented the award for Best Game Direction
Christopher Nolan	Presented the award for Game of the Year

=== Performers ===
The following individuals or groups performed musical numbers. A planned orchestral version of Cyberpunk 2077's music was scrapped when the game was delayed to the same day as the ceremony, rendering it ineligible for nomination.

Name	Song	Game(s)	Location
Lyn Inaizumi	"Last Surprise (Scramble)"	Persona 5 Strikers	Tokyo
OFK (Note: OFK is a fictional band from the game We Are OFK. Its performance served as the game's announcement.)	"Follow/Unfollow"	We Are OFK	Virtual
London Philharmonic Orchestra	Mario medley	Super Mario series	Abbey Road Studios, London
Eddie Vedder	"Future Days"	The Last of Us Part II	Seattle
London Philharmonic Orchestra	Game of the Year medley (Note: The Game of the Year medley's songs included: "Let the Battles Begin!" from Final Fantasy VII Remake; "The Only Thing They Fear Is You" from Doom Eternal; "Jin Sakai" from Ghost of Tsushima; "The Last of Us Part II" from The Last of Us Part II; "Out of Tartarus" from Hades; "Welcome Horizons" from Animal Crossing: New Horizons)	Animal Crossing: New Horizons	Abbey Road Studios, London
London Philharmonic Orchestra	Game of the Year medley	Doom Eternal	Abbey Road Studios, London
London Philharmonic Orchestra	Game of the Year medley	Final Fantasy VII Remake	Abbey Road Studios, London
London Philharmonic Orchestra	Game of the Year medley	Ghost of Tsushima	Abbey Road Studios, London
London Philharmonic Orchestra	Game of the Year medley	Hades	Abbey Road Studios, London
London Philharmonic Orchestra	Game of the Year medley	The Last of Us Part II	Abbey Road Studios, London

== Ratings and reception ==
=== Nominees ===
Inverse's Corey Plante felt the cutoff date led to several games getting snubbed, including Demon's Souls and Marvel's Spider-Man: Miles Morales, as well as Pokémon Sword and Shield, which was eligible for both the 2019 and 2020 awards but was unrecognized in both. He felt Ghost of Tsushima was more deserving of a Best Score and Music nomination than Doom Eternal. Den of Geek's Matthew Byrd similarly lamented the lack of recognition for Demon's Souls and Marvel's Spider-Man: Miles Morales. Kat Bailey of USgamer questioned Doom Eternal's nomination for Game of the Year, describing it as "messy, unfocused, and, well, just not as good" as its predecessor. Kotaku Australia's Alex Walker similarly found the nomination misplaced and considered games like Half-Life: Alyx and Microsoft Flight Simulator more deserving.

=== Ceremony ===
The show received a mixed reception from media publications. VentureBeat's Dean Takahashi praised the ceremony, particularly applauding its celebration of diverse games such as The Last of Us Part II and Tell Me Why as well as the varied and interesting new game announcements. Todd Martens of Los Angeles Times felt the show should have allowed more time for the developers to speak and discuss their artistic visions behind the games, noting the presentation does little to demonstrate video games as art. Eurogamer's Martin Robinson said the show was understandably "low-key" but called it a "three-hour long advert". Inverse's Ana Diaz criticized the rapid announcement of winners between premieres and during the preshow, preventing developers from accepting the awards, and its focus on Hollywood actors over game creators.

Similar to concerns over Death Stranding's predominance in the nominations and ceremony for the 2019 awards due to its creator Hideo Kojima's friendship with Keighley, some viewers shared concerns related to The Last of Us Part II at the 2020 awards, both for its awards success and due to the developer's crunch practices. The Last of Us Part II was well-received at release but narrative elements polarized some critics and players, and the game had been subject to review bombing; Keighley clarified the awards were not rigged in the manner some viewers had suggested and there was no influence of Naughty Dog or its staff on the award selection, citing the game's popularity among players and media alike as proven by its runner-up placement in the Player's Voice award. Kotaku's Ian Walker criticized the game's Best Game Direction win, noting Hades should have won due to developer Supergiant Games's less demanding work culture. TheGamer's Peter Glagowski similarly felt the game's awards were a message excusing crunch culture in game development. Keighley felt it would be difficult to incorporate criteria related to games developed under poor industry practices like crunch into the awards selection process without becoming a slippery slope, but believes discussions of these practices should be a conversation held by the larger community.

=== Viewership ===
Over 83 million streams were used to view the ceremony, the most in the show's history to date, with 8.3 million concurrent viewers at its peak. On Twitch, the show had over 2.63 million concurrent viewers, more than double the previous year, with 9,000 creators co-streaming the ceremony. On YouTube, live viewership increased 84 percent over the previous year. In total, live hours viewed increased by over 129 percent across Facebook Gaming, Twitch, and YouTube. The show trended worldwide on Twitter, with a 31 percent increase in conversation from the previous year, while usage of the hashtag #TheGameAwards increased 107 percent. Keighley expressed his surprise by the consistent growth of the show over the years, but confessed it has led him to fear "that year where it doesn't grow ... There's going to be a year where we don't have the same viewers".
