= Game accessibility =

Accessibility of video games to disabled people

Within the field of human–computer interaction, accessibility of video games is considered a sub-field of computer accessibility, which studies how software and computers can be made accessible to users with various types of impairments. It can also include tabletop RPGs, board games, and related products.

In spring 2020, the COVID-19 pandemic caused a massive boom of the video game industry. With an increasing number of people interested in playing video games and with video games increasingly being used for other purposes than entertainment, such as education, rehabilitation or health, game accessibility has become an emerging field of research, especially as players with disabilities could benefit from the opportunities video games offer the most. A 2010 study estimated that 2% of the U.S. population is unable to play a game at all because of an impairment and 9% can play games but suffers from a reduced gaming experience. A study conducted by casual games studio PopCap games found that an estimated one in five casual video gamers have a physical, mental or developmental disability. As games are increasingly used as education tools, there may be a legal obligation to make them accessible, as Section 508 of the Rehabilitation Act mandates that schools and universities that rely on federal funding must make their electronic and information technologies accessible. As of 2015, the U.S. Federal Communications Commission (FCC) requires in-game communication between players on consoles to be accessible to players with sensory disabilities. In 2021, video game developers attempted to improve accessibility through every possible avenue. This includes reducing difficulty and enabling auto fire.

Outside of being used as education or rehabilitation tools video games are used as identification aspects leading disabled people to work much harder to attach additional meaning when gaming. This transforms the very nature of playing video games into a fight against a digitally divided culture while seeking their own magic circle.

== Barriers to access ==
Video game accessibility problems can be grouped into three categories that correlate to a specific type of impairment:

- Not being able to receive feedback from the game due to a sensory impairment. Examples include: not being able to hear dialogue between game characters or audio cues, such as an explosion, because of a hearing impairment or unable to see or distinguish visual feedback, such as different colored gems in a puzzle game due to a visual impairment such as colorblindness.
- Not being able to provide input using a conventional input device due to a motor impairment; for example, users who rely upon using switch controller or eye trackers to interact with games may find it very difficult or impossible to play games that require large amounts of input.
- Not being able to understand how to play the game or what input to provide due to a cognitive impairment. People with learning disabilities may have low literacy or a combination of complex needs; for instance an individual might also have ataxia or limited coordination. For example, real-time strategy games require a lot of micromanagement, which may be too difficult to understand and to perform for someone with a learning impairment.

== Government regulations ==
=== United States ===
In the US, the Twenty-First Century Communications and Video Accessibility Act of 2010 (CVAA) brought up-to-date accessibility guidelines to advanced communication services (ACS), which is considered to include video games with communication elements including text and voice chat and the user interface (UI) elements to reach the chats. Video game trade groups including the Entertainment Software Association have requested waivers of CVAA enforcement for video games, arguing that while there is strong interest in the video game community to provide accessibility, video games are first and foremost for entertainment and not for communication, and that because of the complexity of video game software, there are few standardized solutions compared to other ACS platforms.

The Federal Communications Commission granted a final waiver that expired on December 31, 2018, making all video games developed and released after January 1, 2019, expected to be compliant with the CVAA; games that were partially developed after January 1, 2019, are expected to reasonably meet the CVAA compliance, as well as any game that issues major updates after that date. The FCC would hear consumer complaints about games that failed to meet the CVAA, determine how feasible the remedy would be, and then determine if they should issue fines against the publisher of the game title.

== Accessible game categories ==
Over the past decade, small companies and independent game developers have developed numerous games that seek to accommodate the abilities of players with the most severe impairments and which has led to some of the following accessible game categories:

- Audio games are games specifically for gamers who are blind. These games can be played without visual feedback and instead use audio-based techniques such as audio cues or synthetic speech. The audiogames website provides a comprehensive overview of available games.
- Visual accessibility in AAA video games: not designed specifically for disabled gamers, but often have a tab in the settings menu with accessibility features. Visual accessibility features are often listed at the top of the menu.
- One-switch games are games that can be played using switch access and which accommodate the abilities of users with severe motor impairments or cognitive impairments. The oneswitch website provides an overview of available one switch games.
- Games for people with a learning disability: people with a learning disability may have low literacy or a combination of complex needs; for instance, an individual might have ataxia or limited co-ordination in addition to a learning disability.
- Universally accessible games are games that offer multiple interfaces to support different impairments.

In recent years, game accessibility has been actively researched, for example in student projects.

The Last of Us Part II (2020) by Naughty Dog is known for its strong focus on accessibility. The game includes over 60 settings to help players with different disabilities. These include things like text-to-speech, high-contrast visuals, and sound cues for gameplay. The developers worked with accessibility experts and players to make sure the settings were useful. The game won the first "Innovation in Accessibility" award at The Game Awards in 2020.

Many tabletop games require the ability to see and understand complex information. Sites like 64ozgames.com provide accessibility kits to make inaccessible tabletop games more inclusive.

The Entertainment Software Association announced its Accessibility Games Initiative along with its partners EA, Google, Microsoft, Nintendo of America, and Ubisoft, in March 2025. The Initiative is designed to provide 24 tags that can be used on physical or digital product labelling to indicate a game's features that address accessibility, such as have narrated menus or joystick inversion controls.

== Modifications for improved accessibility ==
=== Development tools ===
Electronic Arts announced in August 2021 that it will offer five patents related to accessibility, including the ping system introduced in Apex Legends, for free to all developers to use without fear of litigation indefinitely, as well as plans to promote any future patents related to accessibility within video games in the same manner.

=== Controllers ===
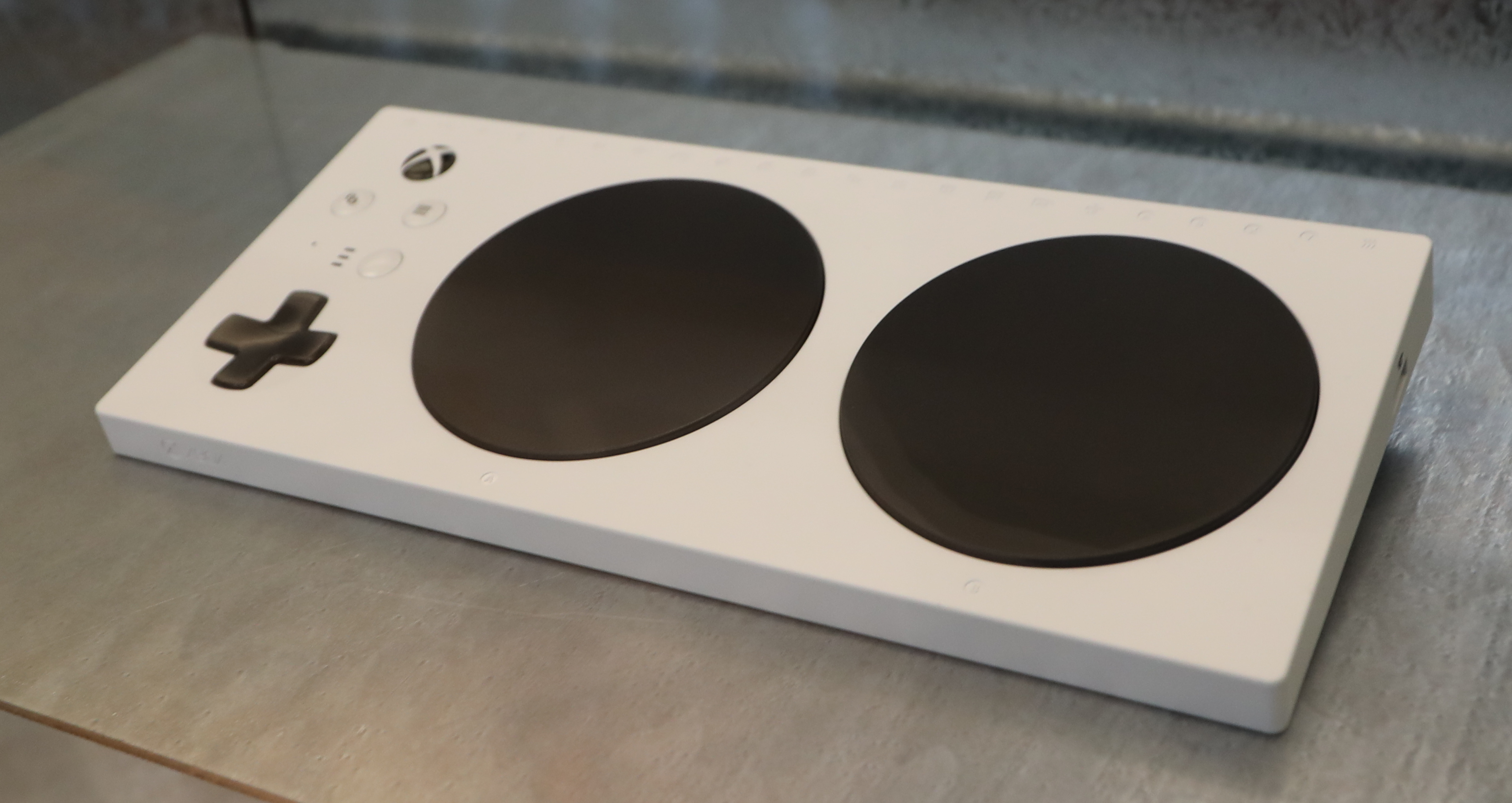
Xbox Adaptive Controller

Small companies and volunteer-based groups have modded video game controllers to help make video games more accessible for those with physical impairments. Despite these innovations there is no one-size-fits-all solution for accessible controllers.

- Game Box Controllers are modified Xbox, Xbox 360, PlayStation 3 controllers, with different switches and are custom to the needs of the individual, with much variety.
- Ben Heck modifies Xbox One controllers to be able to function single-handedly.
- The Controller Project is a volunteer based project where people can request or build custom controller modifications to better other's gaming experiences.
- SpecialEffect is a UK-based charity where therapists and technologists modify game controllers and eye motion software to improve the accessibility for games for people with impairments.
- Console Tuner is a piece of equipment which lets the player use their preferred controller (Xbox, PlayStation, Wii, mouse and keyboard) on compatible systems.
- Quadstick is a controller built specifically for quadriplegics.
- Tip Device is a tongue-operated Ai-powered HID, built specifically for users with quadriplegia and spinal muscular atrophy.
- In 2021, student researchers at the University of California developed and tested a control system based on facial expression recognition with hopeful results.
- Xbox and Windows support the ability for a second controller to be used to assist in game input. Microsoft calls this feature "Xbox Controller Assist", formerly "Copilot". In September 2023, Sony announced an update to PlayStation 5 allowing two controllers to be used at once, allowing a second player to assist in control of the game.

In September 2018, Microsoft released the Xbox Adaptive Controller, which is the first accessible controller created by a large game controller manufacturer. Besides featuring larger-than-normal buttons and controller inputs, the device allows numerous other devices to be connected through it and programmed for various features, allowing it to be adapted to a wide range of potential disabilities. Microsoft also worked other connectivity options to allow the Adaptive Controller to be connected to other consoles including PlayStation units and the Nintendo Switch, as well as with personal computers.

Sony followed with its own first-party adaptive controller under the working name Project Leonardo in January 2023. The controller is split into two parts with the ability to customize the physical layout of buttons to the user's preference. In September 2023, Sony announced haptic feedback for menu navigation to provide additional feedback on UI inputs for players with hearing or vision impairment.

=== AAC ===
Augmentative and Alternative Communication technologies are making their way into the gaming industry to improve the social experience for users who are deaf or mute by providing an alternative to mic based communication.

- Chat Transcription by PlayStation allows its user to read what others say and send text to speech messages through the PlayStation 4's Google Play App named "PlayStation Second Screen".
- Party Chat Speech Transcription and Synthesis by Microsoft provides similar functionality to its PlayStation counterpart but presents the information on the TV through a first party solution.
- Callouts Evolved is a cross-play compatible solution that adds Speech Commands and Speech Synthesis to an interactive shared visual interface. It can be accessed on Xbox and PlayStation and is compatible with Picture-in-picture

== Strategies for improving accessibility ==
There have been several attempts at composing a set of game accessibility guidelines similar to the Web Content Accessibility Guidelines. The most prominent is the Game Accessibility Guidelines. Due to the nature of video games though, some of the guidelines are intentionally broken by developers to present a challenge. A good example of this is when Bungie recreated the Vault of Glass Raid. They made several choices to make the encounters more challenging. In the first version, when players were teleported at Atheon there was an indication on the minimap as to where the players went so deaf players could see what door they had to open. In the remake, this indication is removed to encourage communication and present more of a challenge, at the cost of accessibility.

=== Guidelines by advocacy organizations ===
The International Game Developers Association (IGDA) Special Interest Group on Game Accessibility proposed 19 accessibility guidelines in 2004, which were derived from a survey of 20 accessible games. The majority of the games surveyed include games for the visually impaired, and several support motor or hearing impaired gamers.

The Norwegian Medialt organization published a set of 34 game accessibility guidelines on its website, based on the 19 IGDA game accessibility SIG guidelines as well as their own set of guidelines.

2012 saw three major launches, Best Practices in Video Games in April 2012 by CEAPAT, Game Accessibility Guidelines in September 2012 by a group of developers, specialists and academics, and Includification, also in September 2012, by AbleGamers.

In 2019, AbleGamers launched Accessible Player Experience APX, to increase the number of accessibility experts in AAA studios, as part of their new website. APX focuses on provided an equal play experience without making designers feel restricted, and adding 'Accessibility Champions' to design teams in large studios.

=== Strategies from academic research ===
A general criticism of the guidelines is that they tell a developer what to do but not why or how. An extensive literature survey of existing accessible games identified a game interaction design model that allows for precisely eliciting how a disability impairs the ability to play a game. Based on this interaction design model three unique types of high-level accessibility barriers can be identified. Based on existing accessible games, the following strategies are proposed to make games accessible:

- Sensory impairment (Deafness/Hard of Hearing and visual impairment)
  - Enhance stimuli: for example, high contrast color scheme, increased font size, color blind friendly color scheme and zoom options.
  - Replace stimuli: for example, subtitles or closed captioning, audio cues, sonification, speech synthesis or haptic cues.
- Motor impairment
  - Replace input: for example, support for direct voice input or a brain–computer interface.
  - Reduce input: for example, switch access scanning and remove or automate inputs.
- Cognitive impairment
  - Reduce stimuli: for example, limit the number of game objects, or simplify the storyline.
  - Reduce time constraints: for example, slow down the game.
  - Reduce input: for example, remove or automate inputs that needs to be provided.

== Advocacy ==
Games journalism articles generally advocate for accessibility in two ways: first, simple awareness, as more discussion on the topic aids in "justifying the need to address these challenges in the breadth of game culture"; and second, solutions to accessibility problems benefiting players and developers alike.

Several media outlets and game development/production companies participate in Global Accessibility Awareness Day campaigns to raise funds and spread awareness among the public as well as their own staff.

Stevie Wonder, while presenting at the 2009 VGA Awards, spoke out about game accessibility requesting the industry create more accessible games.

Several advocacy organizations and groups have been formed to raise awareness within the game industry of the importance of making games accessible.

- In 2003, the International Game Developers Association (IGDA) introduced the Game Accessibility Special Interest Group, founded by Thomas Westin. In 2006, the Bartiméus Accessibility foundation initiated the Game Accessibility project, a project which focuses on creating awareness and providing information for game developers, researchers and gamers with disabilities, led by Richard Van Tol. These two major groups work together as advocates within the game industry for increasing the accessibility of video games for gamers with disabilities.
- In 2004, two gamers with disabilities, Mark Barlet and Stephanie Walker, founded AbleGamers.com, set out to further advance game accessibility in the AAA gaming space. Some of their efforts include pressuring NCSoft to remove Game Guard from the game Aion and discussing the addition of colorblind friendly enhancements to the game World of Warcraft with game developer Blizzard. In 2009, AbleGamers.com started 501(c)(3) nonprofit The AbleGamers Foundation to facilitate their work.
- In 2010, the Accessible GameBase was launched by the charity SpecialEffect. This was a site that aimed to develop a welcoming, all-encompassing gaming community.
- In 2012, a group of games studios, specialists and academics came together to create the Game Accessibility Guidelines which won the FCC's Chairman's award for Advancement in Accessibility. This website has many tips for game developers as to how to make their games more accessible to those who have disabilities. They raise awareness about the need for accessibility and the ease of which some features can be implemented.
- In 2016, the site Meeple Like Us was launched. With a specific focus on board games, it provides comprehensive and detailed accessibility analyses of hundreds of modern hobbyist tabletop games, along with reviews and editorials on a range of game accessibility topics. In 2024, a book of observations and insights was published by the author.
- In 2018, Coty Craven launched Can I Play That?, a games accessibility resource for gamers and developers. Can I Play That? expanded upon their previous Deaf / hard-of-hearing video game reviews to consider the wider experience of disabled gamers. Can I Play That? provides accessibility reviews, news and features, as well as workshops for developers and games studios and annual Accessibility Awards.

Despite these, and other initiatives, many game developers are still unaware of game accessibility. Developers who acknowledge the importance of game accessibility and want to use it in their designs often do not know how to do so. Games developed in research projects usually consist of small demos ("proofs of concept") which lack the quality and (re)playability of mainstream games. This is usually also the case with games that have been developed by small companies and hobbyists. Knowledge about accessible game design that is gained in such projects often fails to get documented.

In recent years, game accessibility has become a topic of increasing interest to the academic research community. It is recommended that collaborating with people who have disabilities can vastly improve the results of accessibility initiatives.

== See also ==
- Computer accessibility
- Xbox Adaptive Controller
