= Love Shore =

2023 video game

- Official Poster
- Developer: Perfect Garbage Studios
- Publisher: Perfect Garbage Studios
- Directors: Son M.; Emmett Nahil
- Producers: Son M.; Emmett Nahil; Suvi Savikko
- Designers: Son M.; Sonja M. LaRosa; Suvi Savikko
- Programmer: Jason Davey
- Artists: Suvi Savikko; Marilyn Moats; Zi Xu; Elliott Birt; Gen Revuelta; Ria Martinez; Ozzie Elmore
- Writers: Son M.; Emmett Nahil
- Composers: Suvi Savikko; Jayson Alexander
- Platforms: Microsoft Windows; macOS; Xbox Series X/S
- Release: June 30, 2023
- Genres: Visual Novel; Cyberpunk Noir
- Mode: Single-player

Love Shore is a cyberpunk noir visual novel developed and published by Perfect Garbage Studios. Set in the cyberpunk city of Love Shore, the game revolves around protagonists Sam and Farah, who attempt to navigate the monstrous underworld in hopes of uncovering the means to save their friends.

The game was released for Xbox Series X/S and Steam on June 30, 2023. Love Shore is the debut title of developer, Perfect Garbage Studios.

== Gameplay ==
Gameplay from Love Shore

Love Shore is a visual novel that contains eight different story routes and romance options for its two main characters, over twenty-five endings depending on choices made throughout the game, and interweaving plot points. The city of Love Shore operates on a 24-hour system. The player sees a shift in UI, sprites and aesthetics as day turns to night and vice-versa.

The game contains RPG elements such as stat building based on actions performed throughout the game. Every choice made relates to a stat or point system. Three stats are always visible to the player: strength, courage, and intelligence. As the player make choices throughout the game, the path they choose impacts and improves stats. When a player’s stats are too low, specific choices become locked; a low intelligence stat will bar a player from picking a choice that only high intelligence can allow.

== Setting ==
The game takes place in the fictional cyberpunk city of Love Shore, a future metropolis inhabited by both humans and old gods. When the city faces a fertility crisis, biotech firm Life S. Incorporated steps in, creating fully-formed human beings composed of cybernetic parts, save for their biological brains. These cyborgs are called S.Humans. But the firm’s profitability soon begins to suffer as the crisis passes. Life S. Inc manages to build 100 S.Humans before going bankrupt, leaving the remaining cyborgs to fend for themselves.

The game features gods and supernatural beings from a variety of cultures, including Aztec mythology, Maya Mythology, Yoruba mythology, Hinduism, and Greek mythology, among others.

=== Characters ===
Love Shore has two playable characters, Farah and Sam, two artificially created humans made after an event drastically altered life in the futuristic city of Love Shore. Though the characters live separate lives, their storylines intertwine due to their origins. Both Farah and Sam have four romanceable character-locked NPCs available to interact with during their storylines.

== Development ==
Love Shore will be the debut release from Perfect Garbage Studios, founded in 2019. The studio is headed up by Studio Director, Son M. and Narrative Design Director, Emmett Nahil. The team cites finding a lot of value and support within the network of fellow indie developers they established upon entering the indie gaming community.

Love Shore’s inception began over a late-night airport phone call from M. to Nahil, inquiring if they would be interested in making a game together. It was originally conceived as a horror story that M. was writing prior to Perfect Garbage’s formation.

The team leaned into narrative games with unique mechanics, citing titles like Dishonored, Shadow of the Colossus, Devil May Cry, and Bioshock as inspiration.

=== Crowdfunding ===
In March 2019, Perfect Garbage launched a public Kickstarter to fundraise for development costs. The campaign featured a downloadable demo for Windows, Mac, and Linux. The campaign raised over $62,000 of its original $50,000 goal. In October 2022, Perfect Garbage released a special exclusive demo for Kickstarter backers.

Perfect Garbage was also a recipient of the Moonrise Fund, an early-stage gaming investment fund from indie publisher, GLITCH. They were recipients along with Skullgirls developers, Future Club and Virtuoso Neomedia.

== Soundtrack ==
The Love Shore soundtrack consists of 30+ original compositions by Suvi Savikko and Jayson Alexander.

The soundtrack was released on Bandcamp, Spotify, Apple Music, and for purchase on Steam in June 2023.

== Release ==
Love Shore was released in June 2023 on Windows, macOS, and Xbox Series X/S.
