= Carrion (video game) =

2020 video game

- Steam storefront header
- Developer: Phobia Game Studio
- Publisher: Devolver Digital
- Director: Sebastian Krośkiewicz
- Producers: Anna Sajecka; Andrew Parsons; Juan de la Torre
- Designers: Sebastian Krośkiewicz; Krzysztof Chomicki
- Programmer: Sebastian Krośkiewicz
- Artist: Sebastian Krośkiewicz
- Writer: Nigel Lowrie
- Composers: Cris Velasco; Maciej Niedzielski
- Engine: MonoGame
- Platforms: Linux; macOS; Nintendo Switch; Windows; Xbox One; PlayStation 4; PlayStation 5; Android; iOS
- Release: Linux, macOS, Switch, Windows, Xbox One; July 23, 2020; PlayStation 4; October 22, 2021; PlayStation 5; April 27, 2023; Android, iOS; November 5, 2024
- Genre: Horror
- Mode: Single-player

Carrion is a 2020 horror video game developed by Polish developer Phobia Game Studio and published by Devolver Digital. Described as a "reverse-horror game", the game allows players to control a tentacled monster whose objective is to make its way through a facility, stalking and killing humans in its path.

Carrion was released for Linux, macOS, Nintendo Switch, Windows, and Xbox One on July 23, 2020.

== Gameplay ==
Players control a red, amorphous, tentacled monster of unknown origin. The monster must make its way through a facility, crawling through vents and killing scientists and soldiers. As the game progresses, players can obtain upgrades such as the ability to dash—which can be used to break through wooden barricades and access otherwise unreachable areas—and to grow in size.

== Plot ==
Gameplay screenshot

An amorphous entity known only as "The Creature" is held in a containment unit within a research facility owned by a company called Relith Science. The creature breaks out and progresses through the facility in order to find an exit. As the organism progresses through the facility, it fights and devours its way through the facility's staff and security forces. Along the way, the creature discovers pieces of its genetic code removed by the scientists for study and containment, which allow it to evolve, allowing for greater size and more means of both defense and offense.

The Creature also encounters material analyzers which, upon entering, trigger flashbacks revealing its origins. The Creature was originally found within an egg-like sack by three scientists, and upon awakening, proceeded to kill two and possess the third. However, Relith security forces arrived and executed the remaining scientist, forcing the creature out into the open and allowing Relith to capture and contain it. Eventually, the creature returns to its initial containment area and absorbs the last piece of its stolen genetic code, allowing it to reconstitute a human form, which takes the appearance of the scientist it originally infected. It then escapes the facility and emerges in a partially quarantined city as the sun sets.

== Development ==
Carrion was developed by Phobia Game Studio, an indie game developer based in Warsaw, Poland. According to tweets by developer Sebastian Krośkiewicz, development on Carrion began at least as early as October 2017. Gameplay from Carrion was first shown publicly at the 2018 Game Developers Conference. An official reveal trailer for the game was uploaded to YouTube by Devolver Digital on June 9, 2019. Devolver Digital promoted the game during their press conference at E3 2019.

=== Music ===
The soundtrack by Cris Velasco was released by video game label Materia Collective on July 23, 2020. Velasco sought out Phobia to do the soundtrack after he saw footage of an early animation test on Twitter, and immediately became fascinated by writing a score from a perspective of a monster.

The official vinyl pressing, done in collaboration with Devolver Digital, featured an injection of red hygroscopic liquid to resemble blood splatters. Artwork for the soundtrack was done by Dan Quintana, a friend of Velasco's.

== Release ==
Phobia Game Studio released a demo version of the game on Steam in October 2019.

The game was released on desktop platforms (Windows, Linux and MacOS), Nintendo Switch, and Xbox One on July 23, 2020. A PlayStation 4 version of the game was released on October 22, 2021, and a version for Amazon Luna was made available on November 4, 2021. A PlayStation 5 port was released on April 27, 2023. The game was also released for Android and iOS on November 5, 2024.

Christmas-themed downloadable content titled Greatest Time of Year was released for free on Windows, macOS and Linux on December 25, 2020, and for consoles on March 19, 2021.

== Reception ==
Reception

Aggregate scores
Aggregator	Score
Metacritic	NS: 76/100; PC: 75/100; XONE: 76/100
OpenCritic	75% recommend

Review scores
Publication	Score
Destructoid	8/10
Easy Allies	6/10
Game Informer	7.25/10
GameSpot	7/10
Hardcore Gamer	3.5/5
IGN	7/10
Nintendo Life	8/10
Nintendo World Report	9/10
PC Gamer (US)	72/100

Carrion received generally favorable reviews on Nintendo Switch, PC and Xbox One according to the review aggregation website Metacritic. Fellow review aggregator OpenCritic assessed that the game received strong approval, being recommended by 75% of critics. It received Best Debut Game at the BAFTA Game Awards in 2021. It was nominated for Best Debut Game and Best Indie at The Game Awards 2020, as well as "Outstanding Achievement in Original Music Composition" at the 24th Annual D.I.C.E. Awards.
