= Strata (video game) =

2013 video game

- Developer: Graveck
- Engine: Unity
- Platforms: iOS, Android, Linux, Mac OS X, Microsoft Windows, Windows Phone
- Release: September 12, 2013
- Genre: Puzzle

Strata is a puzzle game developed by Minneapolis-based developer Graveck and initially released on September 12, 2013. It was accepted for inclusion on Steam via Steam Greenlight on May 29, 2014.

== Gameplay ==
Each level has a different grid size, and different types of ribbons. The main goal is to place coloured ribbons down in such a way that the top-most layer of ribbon has matching colors with the square it's placed on.

== Critical reception ==
As of February 2015, the iOS version of the game has a Metacritic score of 85% based on 8 critic reviews.
