= ValiDate: Struggling Singles in Your Area =

2022 video game

- Developer: Veritable Joy Studios
- Publisher: Veritable Joy Studios
- Directors: Dani Lalonders; Cam Perry; Alexis Wizardkicks; Kevin Killjoy; Solange Salgado
- Producer: Dani Lalonders
- Programmers: Cam Perry; Judie Thai; Jam Camera; Francisca Riffo; Jazzy; Geneva Heyward; Sahil Bajaj; Seamus Ly; Alexandra Fren
- Artists: Cindy Thai; Yu Yamamoto; Noah D; Sam Rios; Dreba Borges; Alexis Wizardkicks; Adrian Wahrer
- Composers: Kevin Killjoy; Huey Leone
- Platforms: Microsoft Windows; macOS; Linux; Xbox One; Nintendo Switch
- Release: Microsoft Windows: WW: 29 September 2022; macOS: WW: 29 September 2022; Linux: WW: 29 September 2022; Xbox One: WW: 29 September 2022; Nintendo Switch: WW: 13 October 2022
- Genres: Visual Novel; Romance
- Mode: Single-player

ValiDate: Struggling Singles in Your Area is a romance visual novel and dating simulator developed and published by Veritable Joy Studios. The game follows 13 characters as they navigate love, friendship and adulthood in Jercy City. ValiDate is the debut title of developer Veritable Joy Studios.

The first volume was released for Steam, Itch.io, and Xbox One on September 29, 2022, and later for Nintendo Switch on October 13, 2022.

== Plot ==
ValiDate is a visual novel and dating sim where players interact as 13 creatives living in the fictional Jercy City area, as they navigate "9-to-5s, quarter-life crises, and harsh truths millennials must navigate in their 20s". The game features a cast of Black and brown characters, with different body types, backgrounds, and sexualities. The characters weave in and out of each other's routes, with varying levels of success depending on their unique dynamics.

=== Characters ===
ValiDate's first volume launched with four playable characters:

- Malik, a 26-year-old Bopeye's manager and rapper who cannot seem to find his footing when it comes to relationships.
- Isabelle, a 27-year-old theater teacher who still lives with her family and feels like she is being smothered.
- Inaya, a 25-year-old "Instaglam" chef who struggles with anxiety and self-image, and whose insecurities are reflected in their dates with others.
- Emhari, a 28-year-old bigender mom of two and HR specialist, trying to ignore his immense baggage, while dating and being a parent.

== Gameplay ==
ValiDate's first volume has the option to play as Malik, Inaya, Isabelle, or Emhari. When the game begins, players choose a character and are paired with another member of the cast. Each character has a chapter dedicated to a love interest where the narrative can lead the player through a good, bad, or secret route. These paths are contingent upon the player's choices. Achievements are earned with each completed route.

Gameplay from Validate

ValiDate features a blend of roleplaying and self-insertion, with the narration referring to the player in the second person. However, in selecting a character to assume, rather than playing a generic self-insert for each route, the game allows the player different opportunities depending on which pair of characters is chosen for the date. A date with Malik, while playing as Isabelle, will provide one perspective of the characters, while playing from Malik's perspective can offer an entirely different view of the characters’ personalities.

The game's menu allows the player to choose from a wide range of characters and dates, and the choice of whether or not to continue interacting as the same character, or to choose someone new. Each chapter allows players to gain an additional date for the character they've been playing, or alternatively, a new character altogether.

ValiDate gameplay does not allow the player to choose who to romance and how to do it; it only allows players to choose how the date proceeds per route. A route may not end with romance, and instead completes with the player having fostered a new friendship. Similar to interactive games like The Quarry, the players' choices matter and impact a route's ending. But if a player encounters a character they want to explore in-depth, the predetermined desires of the character they're playing can limit their options.

In-game text implies that routes are more branching, and that depending on the character, relationships may have the potential to change later on. The game additionally offers an option to skip to certain endings via the pause menu.

== Development ==
The game was developed in an estimated three-year period by a team led by lead developer and CEO, Dani Lalonders. The ValiDate team consists entirely of people of color. The team has spoken about creating a game meant to stand out from other dating sims, by showing characters of color as the main characters, and not simply "side characters or caricatures." The current writing team consists of 7 writers for 13 characters.

Artwork featured in ValiDate

The title was officially announced in early 2020. A Kickstarter campaign was launched in July 2020 and was successfully funded by August 2020, having raised over US$47,000 to date. Despite positive reception from the public, the developers have said the game faced unexpected issues and struggles during development, such as fund shortage and difficulty finding a publisher. The game received the support of Xbox. It was funded in part by their New ID @ Xbox Developer Acceleration Program, which seeks to empower underrepresented creators.

The game previously featured character artwork drawn by different artists, in unique styles. During development, Veritable Joy Studios expressed a desire to emphasize that the cast of ValiDate are "average everyday people from the street" and not "drop dead gorgeous Instagram model characters."

A demo was released in April 2022. It offered players the choice of three routes to play: Malik's mixtape revenge arc, Inaya and their edible misadventures, and Isabelle's unsure date at Pink Lobster.

ValiDate was featured as one of the Best Games You Might Have Missed during Summer Game Fest by GameSpot in June 2022.

An update was announced in November 2022, introducing a rhythm mini-game and an auto-save functionality.

Volume 2 of ValiDate was announced on the official game Twitter account: The second chapter will feature Yolanda, Bigs, Rocky, and Arihi as playable characters.

== Release ==
Following a demo release in April 2022, ValiDate's first volume was announced in June, with a tentative release date for August 2022. It was ultimately released on September 29, 2022, for Microsoft Windows, macOS, Linux, and Xbox One. It was later released for Nintendo Switch on October 13, 2022.

ValiDate was featured as one of the games included in Humble Bundle's Love is in the Air collection in February 2023.

== Reception ==
Isaiah Colbert, writing for Kotaku, commended the game for its writing and it being "unafraid to have hard conversations about whether your choices are the best thing in the moment or the long term for its characters."
