= AbleGamers =

American nonprofit organization

AbleGamers Foundation
- Founded: 2004
- Founders: Mark Barlet
- Type: Public Charity
- Purpose: Improving accessibility in video games
- Headquarters: Kearneysville, West Virginia
- Executive Director: Jordan Kough
- Key people: Mark Barlet, Jordan Kough, Steve Spohn, Craig Kaufman, Chris Power
- Revenue: ~$2,000,000 in 2021
- Employees: 11
- Website: ablegamers.org

The AbleGamers Foundation (also known as The AbleGamers Charity) is an American nonprofit organization dedicated to improving accessibility in the video game space, enabling more people with disabilities to be able to play video games. The charity creates resources, assists individuals in getting the peripherals they need, runs scholarships, and works with video game publishers and video game companies to improve accessibility.

== History ==
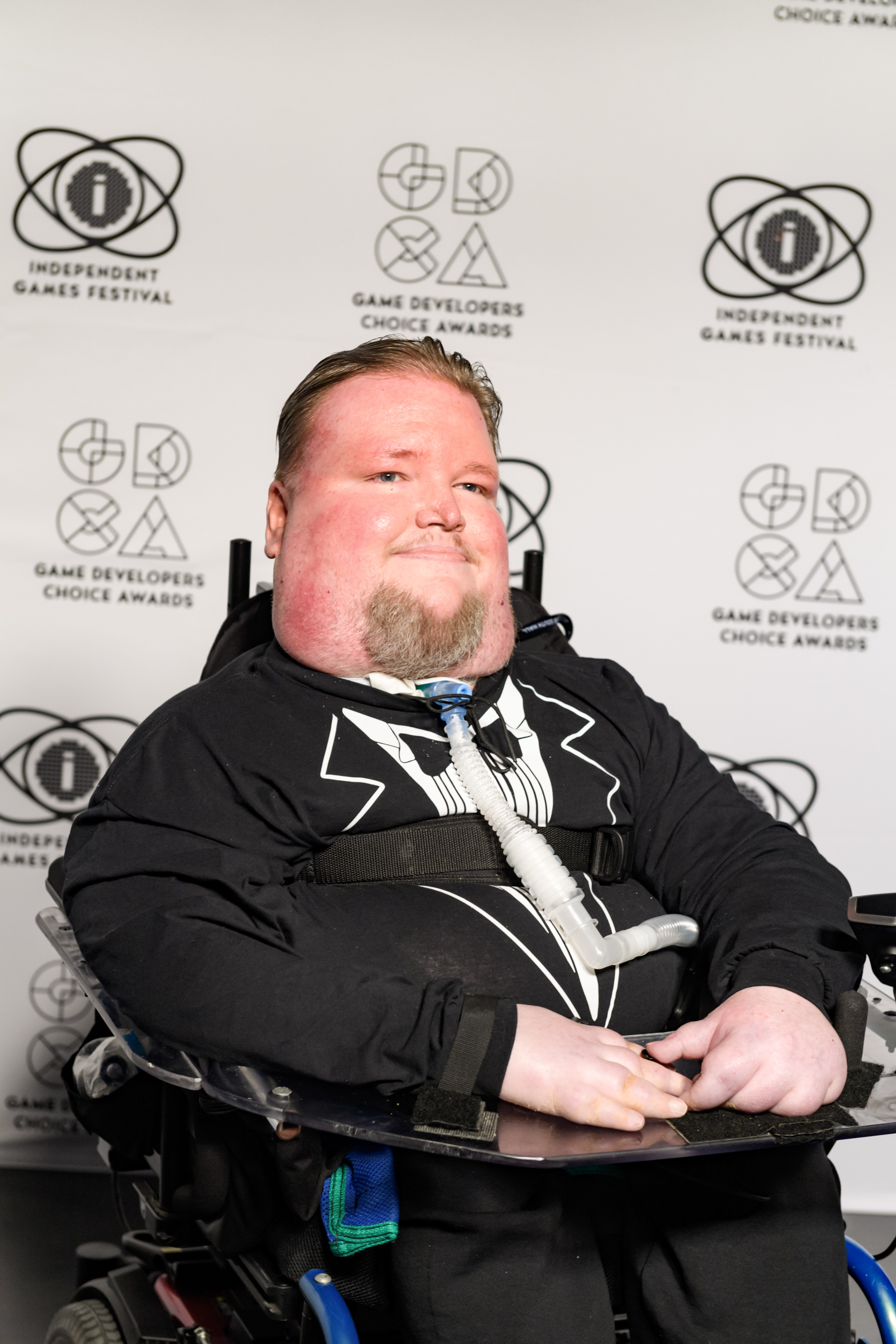
Steven Spohn, COO of AbleGamers, at the Game Developers Conference 2022

AbleGamers was founded by Mark Barlet in 2004 after his best friend, Stephanie Walker, began losing the ability to control a computer mouse due to multiple sclerosis. Barlet and Walker used video games as a way of socializing and maintaining their close friendship. AbleGamers was created with the goal of assisting people with disabilities to play video games. The charity works with individuals to assess their needs and challenges, determining what equipment they need to help them play video games, including both existing and new, custom-made hardware. This includes both online consultations and visits to the charity's facilities. The charity helps up to 300 people every year through direct support, and more through online resources. While the program was initially opened for applications only at certain times of the year, it began being offered year-round from 2013.

The charity has opened Accessibility Arcades in locations such as Washington, D.C.'s Martin Luther King Jr. Memorial Library and the University of Toronto's Semaphore Research Cluster, showcasing accessible hardware and games. In 2013 the charity topped $100,000 USD in donations.

January 2016 the charity announced that it was extending its mission to include a new program entitled "Expansion Packs". Partnering with sponsors, AbleGamers is building accessible game rooms for activity centers that support people with disabilities, the first being at the Pediatric Specialty Care in Hopewell PA.

In 2017 AbleGamers started the Player Panels initiative, whereby gamers with disabilities work with game developers to improve the accessibility of upcoming games, and participate in research studies.

Also in 2017, Mark Barlet, AbleGamer's Founder, talked at Google highlighting the organization and his involvement in bettering the lives of people with disabilities.

The AbleGamers Foundation worked with Evil Controllers to design accessible peripherals for disabled gamers, and in 2018 it was announced that the Xbox Adaptive Controller had been created in partnership with organizations including AbleGamers.

August 6, 2020, marked the premier of a collaboration between AbleGamer's COO Steve Spohn and actor Ryan Reynolds.

Spohn said in September 2020 that he had a goal of raising $1 million for AbleGamers within a year through a series of live streams in an effort he called "Spawn Together". On November 14, 2020, during their virtual convention "GlitchCon", live streaming service Twitch announced that they would be donating US$1 million to the foundation; Spohn was grateful for this contribution but did not consider it part of the $1 million target he had. Spohn reached this goal in August 2021.

AbleGamers was awarded its first patent in 2021 for a "Gaming support assembly and controller holster" that essentially mounts a video game controller into a surface as a way to mitigate being able to support the weight of one.

In 2024, Barlet announced he was stepping down in a LinkedIn post. He was replaced by Jordan Kough as executive director. Former employees alleged abuse and financial mismanagement by Barlet. Two employees filed an Equal Employment Opportunity Commission complaints against the charity, complaining about racism, ableism, sexual harassment, misogyny, and failure by certain members of leadership and the board to protect employees.

=== Center for Inclusive Play ===
In 2012, The AbleGamers Foundation opened "The AbleGamers Center on Game Accessibility and Inclusive Play" in Harpers Ferry, West Virginia. The center offered a place for people with disabilities to experience new accessible technology as well as a maker space for custom controller design and prototyping.

AbleGamers' facility includes a life-size Songbird from BioShock Infinite donated to the charity by Irrational Games in 2014, in addition to rare items such as original Fallout concept art and signed games.

AbleGamers expanded to a new facility, The AbleGamers Center for Inclusive Play, in Charles Town, West Virginia, in 2017. The building was previously a US Coast Guard facility, and includes space to hold consultations, demonstrations, and has a 3D printing studio for manufacturing of specialized equipment. It was funded by a grant from Level Access. The new facility is a much larger space with more room for AbleGamers to create and display hardware, now has a dedicated streaming room, and had many features, such as wide doors, which made it beneficial for supporting disabled guests.

AbleGamers has since moved to Kearneysville, West Virginia, and has widely expanded. The new headquarters building features gaming memorabilia, a full workshop, and the previously mentioned life-size songbird.

== Mission statement ==
Create opportunities that enable play, in order to combat social isolation, foster inclusive communities, and improve the quality of life for people with disabilities.

== Five Pillars ==
AbleGamers utilizes five major pillars to operate under and abide by. These pillars can be thought of as different "departments" that build off of each other. Each pillar and the people who work under them contribute to the mission of the organization.

=== Peer-Counseling ===
"The AbleGamers peer counseling program crafts individualized strategies for people with disabilities to develop solutions to accessibility challenges, combat their social isolation, and join a community of millions of players worldwide.

The peer counseling team consists of players with disabilities and occupational professionals who work together to find solutions to enable play. Through these one-on-one sessions, people with disabilities can connect with other players who can share their knowledge and experience firsthand.

These peer counseling sessions also play hand in hand with the grant program. Adaptive technology is not always affordable. When AbleGamers find players who meet the requirements for the program, there are supportive opportunities that allow the often custom hardware to be granted.

=== Engineering Research ===
The Engineering Research team works in tandem with the Peer Counseling team. When situations arise that do not have physical answers, the engineering team gets to work designing solutions. They often take controllers and modify them to fit the player's needs, whatever that may entail. The Engineering Research pillar has a state-of-the-art facility equipped with 3D printers and laser C&C cutters at their disposal. They currently have three patents, including one design patent.

=== Community & Inclusion ===
The Community & Inclusion pillar sits right in the middle of the five pillars. This pillar is about combating the social isolation that comes with having a disability. The gaming community itself has historically been rich with social interaction and sub-communities that allow it to grow and thrive. AbleGamers aims to include disabled players into that already vast gaming community. Community & Inclusion works to improve accessibility at events, break stereotypes, and provide representation for people with disabilities. They also support a large group of people with disabilities through their twitch stream. The AbleGamers twitch stream allows player with disabilities to interact with other players, share their experiences, and highlight accessibility and people with disabilities as an active part of video gaming.

=== User Research ===
The User Research pillar focuses on the present and future of accessibility. They are tasked with finding and documenting current options for players in games as well as barriers that still exist. "With this pillar we strive to anticipate the next big areas, such as augmented and virtual reality, so that these new technologies can be accessible faster than previous generations of gaming."

The Player Panel falls under the User Research pillar. The Player Panel is one of the world's largest group of people with disabilities dedicated to lending their experiences to make the world more accessible. There are over 400 players currently in the Player Panel program. AbleGamers acts as a middle man between these players and gaming studios (Indie to Triple-A), allowing those companies to test their accessibility features, overall improving accessibility throughout video games.

The User Research team also has multiple publications:

- Cairns, P., Power, C., Barlet, M., Haynes G. (2019) Future Design of Accessibility in Games: A Design Vocabulary. Int. J. of Human-Computer Studies, 131, 64–71, doi: 10.1016/j.ijhcs.2019.06.010
- Cairns, P., Power, C., Barlet, M., Haynes, G., Kaufman, C., Beeston, J. (2019) Enabled Players: the value of accessible digital games, Games and Culture, online
- Beeston, J., Power, C., Cairns, P., & Barlet, M. (2018, July). Accessible Player Experiences (APX): The Players. International Conference on Computers Helping People with Special Needs Springer, 245-253
- Power, C., Cairns, P., Barlet, M. (2018) Inclusion in the Third Wave: Access to Experience. In Filimowicz, M., Tzankova, V. (eds) New Directions in Third Wave Human-Computer Interaction: Volume 1-Technologies. Springer, p. 163-181

=== Professional Development ===
This pillar was designed to educate game studios on how to make their games more accessible. Peer Counseling and Engineering Research can be great at helping people with physical disabilities, but it all starts with the games that are being made. Professional Development teaches an APX (Accessible Player Experiences) course. There are currently 22 APX design patterns that may help developers craft accessible experiences into their games. For some studios, those patterns have been demonstrated to not be good enough. The Professional Development team came up with a multi-day, 16-hour course that remedies this. This completed course certifies developers as APX practitioners and gives them the deeper knowledge they need to create better accessibility in their games.

== Awards ==
Mark Barlet, president of AbleGamers, received the 2012 American Association of People with Disabilities Hearne Leadership Award for his work at AbleGamers.

In 2013, AbleGamers won an MS Society Da Vinci Award for their document "Includification: A Practical Guide to Game Accessibility", the first time the award had been given to a document and concept, not a product.

The foundation distributes its own awards each year to the most accessible games released that year, with winners including FIFA 13 and Bayonetta 2. The awards are given to games with customisable control schemes and colors, optional or minimal quick time events, and unique features such as Bayonetta 2's one-button combat mode.
