= Xbox Adaptive Controller =

Video game controller designed by Microsoft for people with disabilities

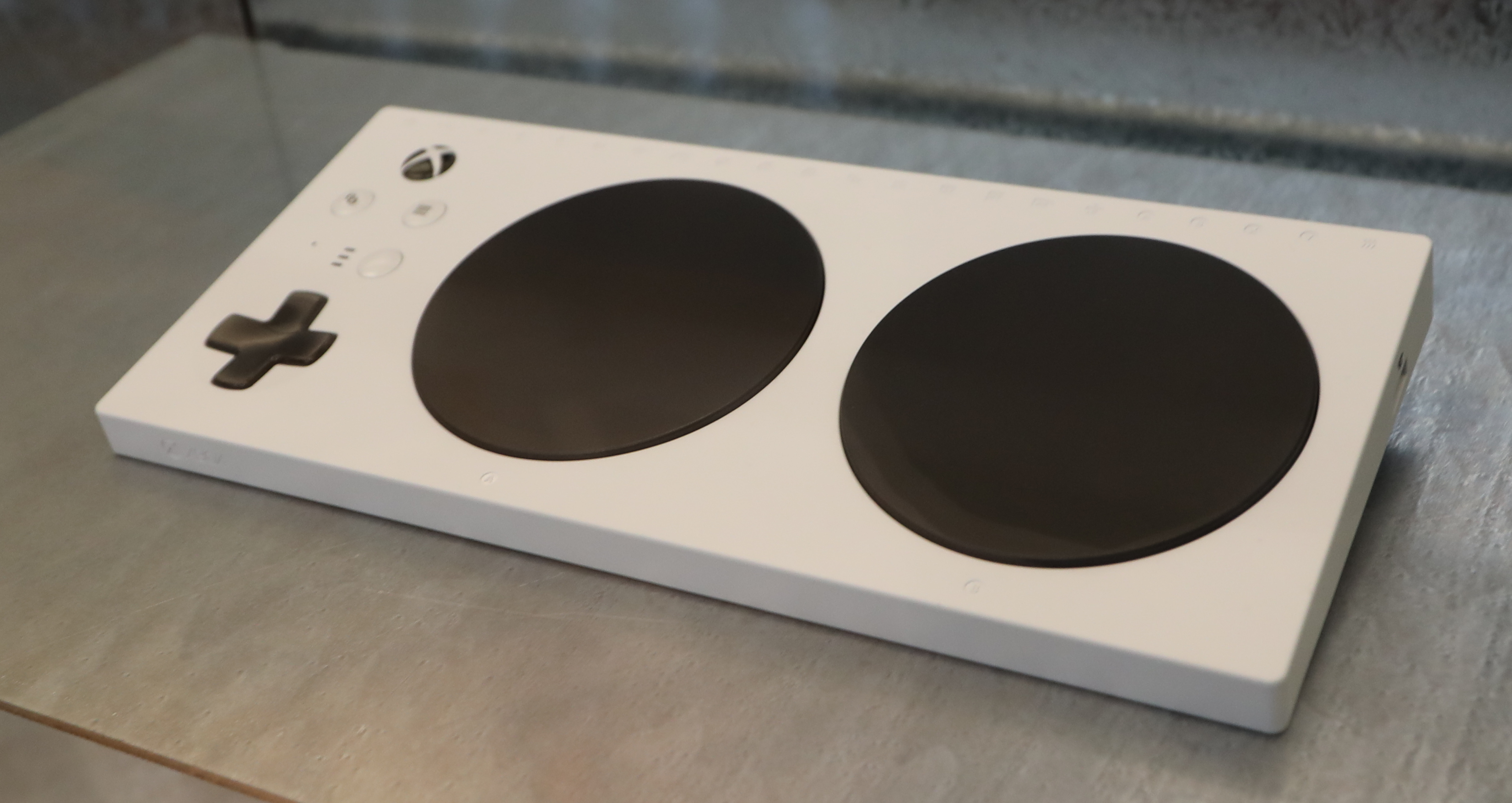
- Developer: Microsoft
- Manufacturer: Microsoft
- Type: Video game controller
- Released: September 4, 2018
- Introductory price: US$99.99
- Platform: Windows, Xbox One, Xbox Series X/S
- Website: Official website

The Xbox Adaptive Controller (XAC) is a video game controller designed by Microsoft for Windows PCs and the Xbox One and Xbox Series X/S video game consoles. The controller was designed for people with disabilities to help make user input for video games more accessible.

== History ==
According to Phil Spencer, Microsoft had started to take more interest in accessibility features for gaming following the Kinect motion sensing input device first introduced in 2010. While it was successful on the Xbox 360, the Xbox One version, released in 2013, failed to make as strong as an impression, and Microsoft eventually dropped Kinect for gaming areas, though has continued to use its technology in more productivity-related applications. However, the company was contacted by parents of disabled or impaired children that positively commented on the ability of the Kinect to help their children enjoy video games without need of a traditional controller.

Matt Hite, an engineer for Microsoft, spotted a custom controller made by Warfighter Engaged on Twitter in 2014; Warfighter Engaged is a nonprofit started by Ken Jones in 2012 that provides gaming devices to injured veterans. Hite contacted Jones and in 2015, a team of engineers at Microsoft's Xbox and gaming division began working on a prototype controller to help improve accessibility for video game input. Initially, the team developed a controller that used the Kinect motion-sensing technology to track the player's gestures and movements and translate them to controller inputs.

Although the motion-tracking controller was not further developed, it was recognized by corporate leadership and inspired another employee team later that year to build a controller attachment with interfaces that allowed non-traditional input devices for gamers who had difficulty using the standard controller. In 2016, Microsoft released the Copilot feature, which linked two controllers to act in tandem as if it were a single controller, allowing one gamer to assist another; this further built momentum for accessibility features for gaming. The prototype device/input hub was designed and refined during several internal hackathon events where they built a controller that could use third-party accessories familiar to disabled gamers. In 2017, Microsoft decided to turn the prototype into a product and began collaborating with accessory manufacturers and nonprofit groups in the gaming accessibility field such as SpecialEffect, Warfighter Engaged, and The AbleGamers Foundation. The gaming division also collaborated with a handicapped gamer known as Randy "N0M4D" Fitzgerald.

=== Release ===
The Xbox Adaptive Controller was announced in May 2018. The controller was released with a retail price of US$99.99 on September 4, 2018. The co-creator of the XAC, Bryce Johnson, emphasized the importance of making the controller affordable: "We did a lot of homework around other assistive technologies and were upset by how much they could be ... [we] made deliberate choices to make sure we kept [the price under $100]."

In November 2018, Microsoft released a holiday-themed television commercial entitled "Reindeer Games" to promote the controller, featuring a group of children racing to another child's home to witness him play a game with the Adaptive Controller. The commercial starred Owen Sirmons, a 9-year-old child with Escobar syndrome. A second commercial entitled "We All Win" was broadcast during Super Bowl LIII, which featured testimonials from Owen and his family on the positive impact of the device.

=== Other uses ===
Microsoft's electronic voting system ElectionGuard includes an Xbox Adaptive Controller in its base alongside its touchscreen.

== Design ==
The Xbox Adaptive Controller has a slim rectangular frame, measuring 292 mm × 130 mm × 23 mm (11.50 in × 5.12 in × 0.91 in) (L×W×H); the controller alone weighs 552 g (19.5 oz). The face of the controller has two large, domed buttons that can be mapped to any function using the Xbox Accessories app; these are each 4 in (100 mm) in diameter and their default mapping is to the A (left, closer to D-pad) and B (right) face buttons on a standard controller. Each of the two large dome buttons make a different sound when depressed to help players distinguish between them. The face also includes a large D-pad, menu button, view button, and the Xbox home button that are featured on a standard Xbox Wireless Controller. In addition, a button allows the player to select one of three saved profiles.

The controller features two USB-A 2.0 ports, one on each side; the USB ports are used to connect devices that map to left and right analog stick functions, corresponding to the side of the XAC. The left side also includes a 3.5mm jack for stereo audio output.

The back of the frame has nineteen 3.5 mm jacks that allow multiple assistive input devices to be connected; each jack corresponds to a different button, trigger, bumper, or D-pad function on the standard Xbox One controller. The Xbox Adaptive Controller supports Windows 10 devices and Xbox One, Series X, and Series S consoles and is compatible with every game at a system level. Each port is also labeled on the face of the controller, and there is a short vertical groove leading to the port from the top of the rear panel, facilitating the installation of assistive inputs. The jacks are designed to require more force than usual to insert or remove a plug, preventing inadvertent disconnection of the assistive input devices. Any of the nineteen ports can be used for a "shift" function, which can add a second function to any of the other ports or buttons on the controller.

There are three machine screw sockets (one threaded 1/4"-20 UNC and two threaded #10-24 UNC) on its underside for mounting the controller. The XAC is equipped with an internal battery that is charged by a USB-C port on the rear panel. A white battery indicator light is provided on the face of the controller, just below the View button; it flashes while charging, and stops flashing when the battery is full. When the battery is low, the light will turn orange. In addition, a coaxial power connector port (5 VDC, 2 A) is provided for attached USB accessories that require additional power, such as the QuadStick. The required AC adapter is sold separately.

The controller is equipped with both the Xbox Wireless Controller communications protocol and Bluetooth 4.1 (Classic Bluetooth HID profile), allowing it to be connected wirelessly to devices other than an Xbox or Windows PC. Alternatively, the controller may be connected via the USB-C port on the back using the included 9 ft (2.7 m) long USB-A to -C cable. According to Phil Spencer, the Adaptive Controller is not hardware-locked to Xbox, and was developed with the intention to be used with any gaming platform, with Microsoft opening dialogue with Valve, Nintendo and Sony towards this effort. Further supporting that broad compatibility, Bluetooth LE (HID over GATT Profile) connectivity was added in a 2021 firmware update.

=== Accessories ===
In addition to the Adaptive Controller, specialized input devices that were developed as part of the project include:

- PDP One-Handed Joystick, a USB analog thumbstick with two digital buttons for the index finger that resembles a Wii Nunchuk.
- The Quadstick (a mouth-operated joystick)
- Head-mounted button system

In 2019, peripheral manufacturer Logitech released its Adaptive Gaming Kit, which bundles 12 buttons and triggers with velcro mounting pads for the Adaptive Controller at a retail price of US$99.99; prior to this, individual inputs were priced around US$50 each.

== Reception ==
Time named the Adaptive Controller one of its Best Inventions of 2018. It also won the Innovation Award at the Italian Video Game Awards. Fast Company gave it Product of the Year for its 2019 Innovation by Design.

Steven Spohn, the chair of AbleGamers, praised the affordability and wide availability of the controller comparing to existing assistive technology, saying that "a device specifically designed for the disability community costing $100 ... [is] a little like finding a unicorn hugging a leprechaun," all the while decrying the "disability tax" attached to devices that are considered "medically necessary." Grant Stoner criticized the total cost of the controller and required accessories, writing in 2020 that while the price of the Adaptive Controller itself was "not too outrageous, especially considering its overall use and compatibility", the addition of required input switches and joysticks results in an "egregious price to assemble an appropriate setup [which] ultimately muddles the hopeful expectation of enabling everybody to play".

=== Influence ===
In 2020, peripheral manufacturer Hori released the Flex Controller (NSW-280), which was designed by Technotool Co., Ltd. and provides similar functions for the Nintendo Switch. The Flex Controller also is compatible with Windows computers. Like the Adaptive Controller, the Hori Flex Controller replicates controller buttons and is equipped with eighteen 3.5mm jacks and two USB-A ports for adaptive input devices, but the Flex Controller is compatible with the Switch and Windows computers only. The Flex Controller connects to the console or computer through a permanently-attached cable terminating in a USB-A plug.

John Helmes, an industrial designer at Microsoft, first customized an Arc Mouse by adding a customized extension that helped his daughter Jara, who has cerebral palsy, to keep her fingers on the buttons. Helmes later brought a challenge to the company's annual hackathon in 2020, proposing an adaptable mouse for people who are not able to use a traditional one. Microsoft announced the Adaptive Accessories line in 2022, initially including three core components: the Adaptive Mouse, Adaptive Button, and Adaptive Hub. The Mouse is a square-shaped core that provides two buttons and a scroll wheel and is designed to be clipped in to plastic accessories to enhance the physical interface. The Button is also a square-shaped core that accepts a physical input on top, such as a directional pad, discrete buttons, or joystick, controlling up to eight discrete inputs. The Hub connects up to four Buttons wirelessly to a computer, and also has 3.5mm jacks for wired adaptive inputs. They were released on October 25, 2022.

Sony announced it would release a similar accessible, customizable controller for the PlayStation 5 based on the Project Leonardo prototype shown at the Consumer Electronics Show in January 2023. The prototype includes a large joystick physically connected to a domed panel with nine assignable inputs; eight buttons are arranged radially around the dome, and the center of the dome itself serves as a ninth input. The size and shape of each radial button can be customized by interchangeable panels. Four 3.5 mm jacks are provided for additional input devices. Up to three controllers (two accessible controllers and one standard DualSense) can be combined into a single logical controller, allowing friends and family to assist with specific inputs. The peripheral was renamed to the Access Controller that May and released in December.

== See also ==
- Game accessibility
