= William C. Morris Award =

Annual literary award

- Awarded for: "a strong literary debut in writing for young adult readers"
- Country: United States
- Presented by: Young Adult Library Services Association, a division of the American Library Association
- First award: 2009
- Website: ala.org/yalsa/morris

The William C. Morris YA Debut Award is an annual award given to a work of young adult literature by a "first-time author writing for teens". It is administered by the Young Adult Library Services Association (YALSA), a division of the American Library Association (ALA).

The award is named for twentieth-century American publisher, William C. Morris, (born 1928 or 1929 and raised in Eagle Pass, Texas, died Sept 28, 2003 in Manhattan), characterized as "an influential innovator in the publishing world and an advocate for marketing books for children and young adults".

The award is funded by the William C. Morris Endowment, established in 2000 and activated in 2003 with a bequest of $400,000 from the Morris estate. Morris donated the money to ALA to fund programs, publications, events, or awards in promotion of children's literature.

In addition to being a member of ALA, Morris was the first recipient of its Distinguished Service Award in 1992. The shortlist for the first award was announced on December 8, 2008, and the winner, A Curse Dark as Gold by Elizabeth C. Bunce, was announced on January 26, 2009, at the ALA's midwinter meeting.

"To be eligible, a title must have been designated by its publisher as being either a young adult book or one published for the age range that YALSA defines as 'young adult', i.e., 12 through 18". About 4000 "YA titles" are published annually and about 10% may be debuts.

== Recipients ==
Morris Award winners and finalists
Year	Author	Book	Result	Ref.
2009	Elizabeth C. Bunce	A Curse Dark as Gold	Winner	
2009	Kristin Cashore	Graceling	Finalist	
2009	Celeste Lecesne (Note: Nominated as James Lecesne.)	Absolute Brightness	Finalist	
2009	Christina Meldrum	Madapple	Finalist	
2009	Jenny Valentine	Me, the Missing, and the Dead	Finalist	
2010	L. K. Madigan	Flash Burnout	Winner	
2010	Kami Garcia and Margaret Stohl	Beautiful Creatures	Finalist	
2010	Amy Huntley	The Everafter	Finalist	
2010	Nina LaCour	Hold Still	Finalist	
2010	Malinda Lo	Ash	Finalist	
2011	Blythe Woolston	The Freak Observer	Winner	
2011	Eishes Chayil	Hush	Finalist	
2011	Karen Healey	Guardian of the Dead	Finalist	
2011	Lish McBride	Hold Me Closer, Necromancer	Finalist	
2011	Barbara Stuber	Crossing the Tracks	Finalist	
2012	John Corey Whaley	Where Things Come Back	Winner	
2012	Rae Carson	The Girl of Fire and Thorns	Finalist	
2012	Jenny Hubbard	Paper Covers Rock	Finalist	
2012	Guadalupe Garcia McCall	Under the Mesquite	Finalist	
2012	Ruta Sepetys	Between Shades of Gray	Finalist	
2013	Rachel Hartman	Seraphina	Winner	
2013	S. D. Crockett	After the Snow	Finalist	
2013	Laura Buzo	Love and Other Perishable Items	Finalist	
2013	Emily M. Danforth	The Miseducation of Cameron Post	Finalist	
2013	Hannah Barnaby	Wonder Show	Finalist	
2014	Stephanie Kuehn	Charm & Strange	Winner	
2014	Carrie Mesrobian	Sex & Violence	Finalist	
2014	Evan Roskos	Dr. Bird's Advice for Sad Poets	Finalist	
2014	Elizabeth Ross	Belle Epoque	Finalist	
2014	Cat Winters	In the Shadow of Blackbirds	Finalist	
2015	Isabel Quintero	Gabi, A Girl in Pieces	Winner	
2015	Jessie Ann Foley	The Carnival at Bray	Finalist	
2015	E. K. Johnston	The Story of Owen: Dragon Slayer of Trondheim	Finalist	
2015	Len Vlahos	The Scar Boys	Finalist	
2015	Leslye Walton	The Strange and Beautiful Sorrows of Ava Lavender	Finalist	
2016	Becky Albertalli	Simon vs. the Homo Sapiens Agenda	Winner	
2016	Leah Thomas	Because You'll Never Meet Me	Finalist	
2016	Kelly Loy Gilbert	Conviction	Finalist	
2016	Stephanie Oakes	The Sacred Lies of Minnow Bly	Finalist	
2016	Anna-Marie McLemore	The Weight of Feathers	Finalist	
2017	Jeff Zentner	The Serpent King	Winner	
2017	M-E Girard	Girl Mans Up	Finalist	
2017	Sonia Patel	Rani Patel in Full Effect	Finalist	
2017	Bonnie-Sue Hitchcock	The Smell of Other People’s Houses	Finalist	
2017	Calla Devlin	Tell Me Something Real	Finalist	
2018	Angie Thomas	The Hate U Give	Winner	
2018	Nic Stone	Dear Martin	Finalist	
2018	S.F. Henson	Devils Within	Finalist	
2018	S.K. Ali	Saints and Misfits	Finalist	
2018	Akemi Dawn Bowman	Starfish	Finalist	
2019	Adib Khorram	Darius the Great is Not Okay	Winner	
2019	Joy McCullough	Blood Water Paint	Finalist	
2019	Ngozi Ukazu	Check, Please!: #Hockey	Finalist	
2019	Tomi Adeyemi	Children of Blood and Bone	Finalist	
2019	Vesper Stamper	What the Night Sings	Finalist	
2020	Ben Philippe	The Field Guide to the North American Teenager	Winner	
2020	Nafiza Azad	The Candle and the Flame	Finalist	
2020	David Yoon	Frankly in Love	Finalist	
2020	Alicia D. Williams	Genesis Begins Again	Finalist	
2020	Katy Rose Pool	There Will Come a Darkness	Finalist	
2021	Kyrie McCauley	If These Wings Could Fly	Winner	
2021	Echo Brown	Black Girl Unlimited: The Remarkable Story of a Teenage Wizard	Finalist	
2021	Christina Hammonds Reed	The Black Kids	Finalist	
2021	Nina Kenwood	It Sounded Better in My Head	Finalist	
2021	Isabel Ibañez	Woven in Moonlight	Finalist	
2022	Angeline Boulley	Firekeeper's Daughter	Winner	
2022	Faridah Àbíké-Íyímídé	Ace of Spades	Finalist	
2022	Margie Fuston	Vampires, Hearts & Other Dead Things	Finalist	
2022	Amber McBride	Me (Moth)	Finalist	
2022	Cory Anderson	What Beauty There Is	Finalist	
2023	Isaac Blum	The Life and Crimes of Hoodie Rosen	Winner	
2023	Jen Ferguson	The Summer of Bitter and Sweet	Finalist	
2023	Elizabeth Kilcoyne	Wake the Bones	Finalist	
2023	Sonora Reyes	The Lesbiana's Guide to Catholic School	Finalist	
2023	Andrew Joseph White	Hell Followed with Us	Finalist	
2024	Byron Graves	Rez Ball	Winner	
2024	Hannah V. Sawyerr	All the Fighting Parts	Finalist	
2024	Kiyash Monsef	Once There Was	Finalist	
2024	Ari Tison	Saints of the Household	Finalist	
2024	Trang Thanh Tran	She Is a Haunting	Finalist	
2025	Meredith Adamo	Not Like Other Girls	Winner	
2025	Ian X. Cho	Aisle Nine	Finalist	
2025	Robin Wasley	Dead Things are Closer Than They Appear	Finalist	
2025	Carolina Ixta	Shut Up, This is Serious	Finalist	
2025	Madeline Claire Franklin	The Wilderness of Girls	Finalist	
2026	DeAndra Davis	All the Noise at Once	Winner	
2026	Stefany Valentine	First Love Language	Finalist	
2026	Askel Aden	Love, Misha	Finalist	
2026	Sheryl Azzam	Red Flags and Butterflies	Finalist	
2026	Mary Shyne	You and Me on Repeat	Finalist	
