= List of fictional aromantic characters =

This is a list of aromantic characters in fiction, i.e. fictional characters that either self-identify as aromantic or have been identified by outside parties to be aromantic. Listed characters may also be asexual or allosexual (not asexual). Some aromantic people are asexual but some are not. The term aromantic can be used in relation to various sexual identities, such as aromantic bisexual, aromantic heterosexual, aromantic lesbian, aromantic gay man, or aromantic asexual, but it does not relate to sexual orientation, instead focusing on romantic orientation. Aromanticism primarily deals with romantic attraction rather than with sexuality. Some publications have argued that there is an underrepresentation of aromantic people in media, in research, and that they are often misunderstood. Aromantic people often face stigma and are stereotyped with labels such as being afraid of intimacy, heartless, or deluded.

== Animated series ==
Characters	Title	Character debut date	Notes	Country
Lilith Clawthorne	The Owl House	February 7, 2020	Eda's older sister and former leader of the Emperor's Coven. In a charity livestream hosted by Dana Terrace on March 13, 2022, a specially produced audio, written by Terrace and recorded by Cissy Jones in character as Lilith, was played. In this audio, Lilith claims to have never felt romantic attraction towards anyone before. Later prompted by Jade King of TheGamer, Jones stated that her audio during the charity stream was "basically canon." Jones would make further allusion to Lilith's aromantic orientation over Twitter, before giving direct affirmation of the character's asexuality on March 18, over Instagram.	United States
Deuce Gorgon	Monster High	May 5, 2010	Deuce is the laid-back and popular teenaged son of Medusa. Traditionally, he has romantic feelings for Cleo, a Cleopatra-inspired mummy. In the 2022 TV series, he and Cleo have romantic history, but they decide to be friends instead after he realizes he has no desire for romance.	United States
Percival King (Percy)	Epithet Erased	2019	A police officer, she has a strict moral code and values order and safety. (The creator of the show, Brendan Blaber, confirmed that she is asexual and may also be aromantic. He also said that while Percy is female and asexual, it was his "intention to leave everything beyond that point up to the viewer", adding that headcannons of fans that she is trans, non-binary, autistic, or anything else, is valid.)	United States
Seiji Maki	Bloom Into You	October 5, 2018	A supporting character, he is an aromantic asexual with well established feelings on sex and romance, and is a "crucial sounding board" for Yuu as she tries to figure out her feelings. In the ninth episode, he says that he does not fall in love, but prefers to watch from the outside. He enjoys romance but does not wish to partake it in himself.	Japan
Peridot	Steven Universe	January 8, 2015	Based on the gemstone peridot, Peridot is a member of an alien species known as gems. Gems are able to "fuse" with one another into singular, gestalt entities known as fusions. However, Peridot is actively disinterested in fusing. According to storyboard artist Maya Petersen, this story element is a metaphor for asexuality and aromanticism, even though she said her word is not "the ultimate authority" on the matter. This asexual identity was never expressed in the show directly, with fans shipping Peridot with various other characters, specifically Lapis Lazuli and Amethyst, some reviewers even seeing Peridot and Lapis in a "close, loving relationship" in the past.	United States

== Film ==
Characters	Title / Franchise	Actors	Years	Notes	Country
Kasumi 'Sobakasu' Sobata	I Am What I Am	Toko Miura	2022	The film is about Sobata's life within amatonormativity. She admits to her suitor that she is asexual and has no romantic feelings for anyone.	Japan

== Literature ==
Characters	Work	Author	Years	Description
Miles Abernathy	Compound Fracture	Andrew Joseph White	2024	Miles is aromantic.
Clariel	Clariel	Garth Nix	2014	She's also quite comfortable with her (apparently aromantic) asexuality, a subject which comes up early on in the book; having experimented with sex out of sheer curiosity, she has no inclination to repeat the experience with either men or women, and consistently deflects the interest of potential romantic/sexual partners. Clariel's lack of experience of sexual or romantic attraction are described at multiple points, come up early in the book, and are treated as a core part of who she is as a person.
Ellis	Loveless	Alice Oseman	2020	Georgia is the main character of Loveless, coming to terms with her sexuality during the events of the book, realizing that she is an aromantic asexual. Georgia also has a conversation with another character, Sunil Jah, who is nonbinary, gay, asexual and friends with Jess, an aromantic bisexual. Also, Georgia's cousin Ellis is an aromantic asexual character.
Jess	Loveless	Alice Oseman	2020	Georgia is the main character of Loveless, coming to terms with her sexuality during the events of the book, realizing that she is an aromantic asexual. Georgia also has a conversation with another character, Sunil Jah, who is nonbinary, gay, asexual and friends with Jess, an aromantic bisexual. Also, Georgia's cousin Ellis is an aromantic asexual character.
Georgia Warr	Loveless	Alice Oseman	2020	Georgia is the main character of Loveless, coming to terms with her sexuality during the events of the book, realizing that she is an aromantic asexual. Georgia also has a conversation with another character, Sunil Jah, who is nonbinary, gay, asexual and friends with Jess, an aromantic bisexual. Also, Georgia's cousin Ellis is an aromantic asexual character.
Firuz-e Jafari	The Bruising of Qilwa	Naseem Jamnia	2022	Firuz-e is aromantic and asexual, or "aroace", in addition to being non-binary.
Rick Ramsey	Rick	Alex Gino	2020	Rick is aromantic and asexual.
Various	Being Aro	Various	2026	The book is anthology focused on aromanticism.

== Live-action television ==
Character	Portrayed by	Program	Years	Notes
Isaac Henderson	Tobie Donovan	Heartstopper	2022–present	Isaac is a featured character of the show adaptation of the graphic novel Heartstopper. In season two of the show, released August 2023, Isaac is introduced to James; an openly gay student at his school. While James clearly expresses his crush on him, it is clear Isaac struggles to understand why he cannot reciprocate James' feelings. Isaac discovers the terminology 'aromantic asexual' at a queer art exhibition and after further personal reading and research. He eventually comes to terms with being aro-ace as he enters his school library and proudly takes Ace: What Asexuality Reveals About Desire, Society, and the Meaning of Sex, a book on asexuality by Angela Chen. Previous to season two's release, Heartstopper creator Alice Oseman confirmed on Twitter that Isaac is aromantic asexual.
Sakuko Kodama	Yukino Kishii	Koisenu Futari	2022	This series revolves around Kodama and Takahashi's developing relationship, after Kodama realizes she is aromantic-asexual by reading Takahashi's blog, while Takahashi is also aromantic asexual as well. Co-director Yuta Oshida came up with the idea for the story after coming to the realization that Japanese television dramas often include romantic relationships and elements, and he later learned about asexuality, with his research including interviewing asexual people.
Satoru Takahashi	Issei Takahashi	Koisenu Futari	2022	This series revolves around Kodama and Takahashi's developing relationship, after Kodama realizes she is aromantic-asexual by reading Takahashi's blog, while Takahashi is also aromantic asexual as well. Co-director Yuta Oshida came up with the idea for the story after coming to the realization that Japanese television dramas often include romantic relationships and elements, and he later learned about asexuality, with his research including interviewing asexual people.
Rudá Sampaio	Guilherme Cabral	Travessia	2022–2023	Rudá is young man who is in tune with the digital world and the son of Guida, played by Alessandra Negrini, from her first marriage. Rudá has a strong connection with his aunt, Leonor, but has little contact with his mother and, especially, with his stepfather, Moretti. Rudá is described as aromantic and strictly asexual, which means he does not feel sexual attraction to anyone, regardless of gender. Rudá gets involved in complicated situations, such as the creation of a deepfake that drastically changes the life of the protagonist, Brisa.

== Comics, manga, and graphic novels ==
Characters	Title	Years	Notes	Country
Amiru	Last Gender: When We Are Nameless	2022	She has a sex drive but is not romantically attracted to anyone else, and pushes to make herself "the main character in her own life."	Japan
Chika	Is Love the Answer?	2023	She detests romance, having sex, or kissing other people, and her professor tells her she is on the asexual spectrum, resulting in her "intensely researching the subject of human sexuality and asexuality" in an effort to understand herself and what other people experience. She is also aromantic.	Japan
Kashikawa	Sex Ed 120%	2020-2021	She is a student who isn't interested in romance or sex, and loves animals.	Japan
Gwendolyn "Gwen" Poole	Marvel Comics	2015–Present	In 2023, it was confirmed that Gwen Poole was the QPR-seeking variety of asexual and aromantic during her story arc in the Love Unlimited series. During this arc, she is in a relationship with Julie Power and discovers what it means to be asexual after Julie tells her that she probably is, while still delving into the kind of life partner she would want to have.	United States
Yuriko	I Want to Be a Wall	2019-2023	She is an asexual woman married, to satisfy the desires of her parents, to a gay man who loves his childhood friend, resulting in a marriage of convenience. She is also aromantic.	Japan
Jughead Jones	Jughead	2016	In 2016, Chip Zdarsky, the writer of the Jughead reboot, confirmed that Jughead is both asexual and aromantic. Other than his obsession with food, Jughead was historically characterized by his aversion to romance and his lack of reciprocation toward his long-time admirer, Ethel.	United States
Nora Chestnut	And Another Lovely Day	2024-Present	Nora is a history teacher and Elliot is an English teacher at the same high school. The webtoon 'And Another Lovely Day' focuses upon their relationship, with the two meeting during an event and mistakenly assuming the other has a crush on them, trying their best to shut that down with completely contrasting methods. The series explores their lives and experiences with being aroace and what it means to be aroace as an adult. The summary of the series explicitly confirms them both to be aromantic asexual.	
Elliott Lam	And Another Lovely Day	2024-Present		

== Video games ==
Character	Title	Year	Notes	Developer
Billie	Billie Bust Up	(yet to be released)	The upcoming musical platformer Billie Bust Up focuses on the titular protagonist Billie the goat. In an official Twitter post for pride month, Billie is illustrated wearing an aroace pride pin on their collar and waving a progress pride flag.	Giddy Goat Games
Dusa	Hades	2020	Based on Medusa, Dusa is a disembodied gorgon head who works as a maid for the Greek god Hades. If the player character attempts to seduce her, she informs him that she's not interested in a romantic relationship with anyone at all.	Supergiant Games
Mirabelle	In Stars and Time	2023	In the turn-based RPG In Stars and Time, the player character must complete several side-quests that involve helping their party members with some personal struggles. Mirabelle can be found sorting through a pile of "bonding proposals" (dating profiles, essentially), putting pressure on herself to choose a partner. Despite expressing a lack of interest and a sense of repulsion at the idea, she feels that her religion, which centers Change, requires that she step out of her comfort zone for the sake of personal growth. After talking to the player character, Siffrin (who is also revealed to be asexual and implied to be somewhere on the aromantic spectrum), Mirabelle begins coming to terms with her disinterest in romance. The creator of the game, insertdisc5, confirmed that Mirabelle is aroace in a Reddit post.	

== Radio, audio drama, and fictional podcasts. ==
Character	Title	Years	Notes	Country
Riz Gukgak	Fantasy High	2018- 2026	Riz Gukgak is a character from the actual play show 'Fantasy High' of Dropout's Dimension 20. In season 2 of the show; 'Fantasy High Sophomore Year', Riz acts confused and frustrated as to why everyone cares about kissing and relationships and when teased for it he claims to be dating a non-existent 'Baron'. Later, Baron comes to life as a manifestation of his lie, showing up throughout the show to taunt him. Riz has no romantic desires, interests or attraction throughout the show and it is shown that one of his greatest fears is that he will be left behind by his friends as they prioritise their romantic pursuits, with Baron pointing out how he is different from all those he knows for lacking their shared desires for romance. Dungeon Master Brennan Lee Mulligan additionally acknowledges him as asexual.	United States
Caduceus Clay	Critical Role	2018-2021	Caduceus Clay is a character from the actual play show Critical Role, showing up in Campaign two The Mighty Nein. Within episode 114 he expresses outright that he is 'not into anybody' after being flirted with. The player that created him confirmed him as asexual and has also stated that he is aromantic with 'no romantic interest'.	United States

== See also ==
- List of fictional asexual characters
- Timeline of asexual history
- List of fictional polyamorous characters
- List of animated series with LGBT characters
- List of comedy television series with LGBT characters
- List of dramatic television series with LGBT characters: 2010–2015
- List of dramatic television series with LGBT characters: 2016–2019
- LGBTQ themes in Western animation
- LGBTQ themes in anime and manga
