= Megaera (disambiguation) =

Megaera is one of the Erinyes in Greek mythology.

Megaera may also refer to:

- 464 Megaira, an asteroid named after the Erinye
- HMS Megaera (1849), a Royal Navy frigate
- A taxonomic synonym for Trimeresurus, a genus of pit vipers
- Megaera, a character in the video game Hades

== See also ==
- HMS Megaera
- Megara (mythology), the oldest daughter of Creon, king of Thebes, in Greek mythology
- Megara (disambiguation)
