= Megara (disambiguation) =

Megara is an ancient Greek city in the region of Megaris in west Attica.

Megara may also refer to:

- Megara (wife of Heracles), a mythological Greek princess
- Megara (Disney character), a fictional character from the 1997 Disney animated film, Hercules
- Megara (Thessaly), a town in ancient Thessaly, Greece
- Megara Gulf, in the northern part of the Saronic Gulf of the Aegean Sea
- Megara Hyblaea, an ancient Greek colony in Sicily, near Augusta
- Megara (band), a Spanish metal and rock band who represented San Marino at the 2024 Eurovision Song Contest.
- Megara, an agricultural suburb of Ancient Carthage, named in the famous incipit of Gustave Flaubert's novel Salammbô
- MEGARA (spectrograph), astronomical instrument for the Gran Telescopio Canarias

== See also ==
- Mağara (disambiguation)
- Mega (disambiguation)
- Megaera (disambiguation)
