= Mağara =

Mağara ("cave") is a Turkic place name that may refer to:

- Mağara, Adana, former name of a district in Adana Province
- Mağara, Gadabay, a village in Gadabay Rayon, Azerbaijan
- Mağara, İdil, a village in Şırnak Province
- Mağara, Silifke, a village in Mersin Province, Turkey
- Magara (Tanzanian ward)

== See also ==
- Megara (disambiguation)
