= Hell Followed with Us =

2022 novel by Andrew Joseph White

- Author: Andrew Joseph White
- Language: English
- Genre: Dystopia, Horror, Fantasy
- Publisher: Peachtree Teen
- Publication date: June 7, 2022
- Publication place: United States
- Pages: 416
- ISBN: 9781682633243
- Website: andrewjosephwhite.com/hell-followed-with-us

Hell Followed With Us is a 2022 dystopian fantasy horror young adult novel by American author Andrew Joseph White. The book was White’s first published novel.

The novel achieved commercial and critical success. An animated film based on the book is currently in production, led by co-producer Lilly Wachowski.

== Plot ==
Benji, a transgender teenager, escaped from the doomsday cult that destroyed the earth's population, but has been affected with a bioweapon virus meant to finish the apocalypse. He is rescued by a local LGBT center, and the leader reveals to Benji that the virus he's infected with will mutate him into a humanity-destroying monster. Despite this, the center's autistic leader Nick allows Benji to join their group of rebels, under the condition that he controls his mutation.

== Themes and inspiration ==
The book considered themes of religious fundamentalism, as well as colonialism, capitalism, and environmentalism. Kirkus Reviews praised the book for "engaging critically" with the intersection between white supremacy and colonialism.

White cited video games Far Cry 5 and Dead Space as inspiration for the book, as well as Alexander Gordon Smith's Escape from Furnace series.

When reviewing Hell Followed with Us, the School Library Journal noted that, "Vivid descriptions of viscera and gory suffering appear on nearly every page", noting that it would appeal specifically to horror movie and body horror fans.

The cover art for the novel was created by artist Evangeline Gallagher, who has illustrated covers for Daniel Kraus, Lish McBride, and George A. Romero.

== Critical reception ==
Hell Followed With Us was ranked #10 on the New York Times Young Adult Bestseller list in August 2022, and was included in The Year-To-Date 2023 Indie Bestsellers List by the American Booksellers Association. Paste Magazine listed it as one of the Best YA Books of 2022.

It was a finalist for the Young Adult Library Services Association's 2023 Morris Award. Before its publication, it was featured by Lambda Literacy as one of June 2022's most highly anticipated LGBTQIA+ young adult novels.

Author V. E. Tirado commissioned a custom chest binder based on the novel, gaining significant attention.

== Upcoming film adaptation ==
Trustbridge Entertainment acquired the film rights to Hell Followed with Us in 2024. The project is stated to be an anime inspired film, and is being produced in part by Lilly Wachowski, best known for The Matrix franchise, in addition to Powerhouse Animation Studios and Lyrical Animation.
