= Necromancing the Stone =

Necromancing the Stone may refer to:

- "Necromancing the Stone" (Charmed), a 2003 television episode
- "Necromancing the Stone" (Legends of Tomorrow), a 2018 television episode
- Necromancing the Stone, a 2012 novel by Lish McBride
