= Kilcoyne =

Kilcoyne is a surname found in Ireland and the United States. Notable people with this surname include:

- Brendan Kilcoyne (born 1967/1968), an Irish football manager and former player
- Dave Kilcoyne (born 1988), an Irish rugby union player
- David Kilcoyne (hurler) (born 1962), an Irish hurler
- Elizabeth Kilcoyne, an American fiction writer
- Francis Kilcoyne (1901/1902 – 1985), an American professor of English, college president, and Catholic priest
- Jack Kilcoyne, a former bass player in the American band Mushroomhead from 1993 to 1996
- Martin Kilcoyne (born 1968), an American sports anchor
- Meghan Kilcoyne, an American state politician for Massachusetts
