= Margie Fuston =

American writer

- Born: California, USA
- Occupation: novelist
- Writing career
- Language: English
- Years active: 2021- now
- Genre: young adult fiction
- Notable works: Vampires, Hearts, and other Dead Things
- Website: margiefuston.com//

Margie Fuston is an American writer of young adult fiction. She is best known for her debut novel, Vampires, Hearts, and other Dead Things, which was a finalist for the 2022 William C. Morris Award.

== Career ==
Fuston's debut, Vampires, Hearts, and other Dead Things, was released in August 2021 by Margaret K. McElderry Books, an imprint of Simon and Schuster. It is about a teen girl taking a trip to New Orleans with the aim of finding a vampire to save her dying father. It was a finalist for the 2022 William C. Morris Award in 2022, ultimately won by Angeline Boulley for Firekeeper's Daughter. Fuston says that after experiencing loss at a young age, she was "obsessed" with finding out when she'd lose the next person, and thus developed an interest in vampire lore.

Her next novel, Cruel Illusions, is about a girl becoming a vampire hunter following her mother's murder by a vampire. It was released by Margaret K. McElderry Books in November 2022.

Her third novel, The Revenant Games, pitched as All of Us Villains meets Kingdom of the Wicked, is a young adult fantasy about a girl entering a competition between warring witch and vampire kingdoms. It will be published in March 2024 by Margaret K. McElderry Books.

== Accolades ==
Vampires, Hearts, and other Dead Things was a finalist for the 2022 William C. Morris Award.

== Personal life ==
Some of Fuston's favorite media include vampires, including The Vampire Diaries, What We Do in the Shadows, A Girl Walks Home at Night, and Underworld.

== Publications ==
- Vampires, Hearts, & Other Dead Things. Margaret K. McElderry Books. 2021. ISBN 9781534474574.
- Cruel Illusions. Margaret K. McElderry Books. 2022. ISBN 9781665902106.
- The Revenant Games. Margaret K. McElderry Books. 2024. ISBN 9781665934411.
