= Badass Moms in the Zombie Apocalypse =

2020 short story by Rae Carson

"Badass Moms in the Zombie Apocalypse" is a 2020 science fiction/horror short story by Rae Carson, about childbirth and the zombie apocalypse. It was first published in Uncanny.

== Synopsis ==
Because zombies are attracted to blood and screaming, Brit must leave her compound and give birth to her child in a "birthing enclosure" — a shipping container.

== Reception ==
"Badass Moms in the Zombie Apocalypse" was a finalist for the Nebula Award for Best Short Story in 2020, and for the 2021 Hugo Award for Best Short Story.

Strange Horizons called it "hugely satisfying".
