= M-E Girard =

Canadian writer

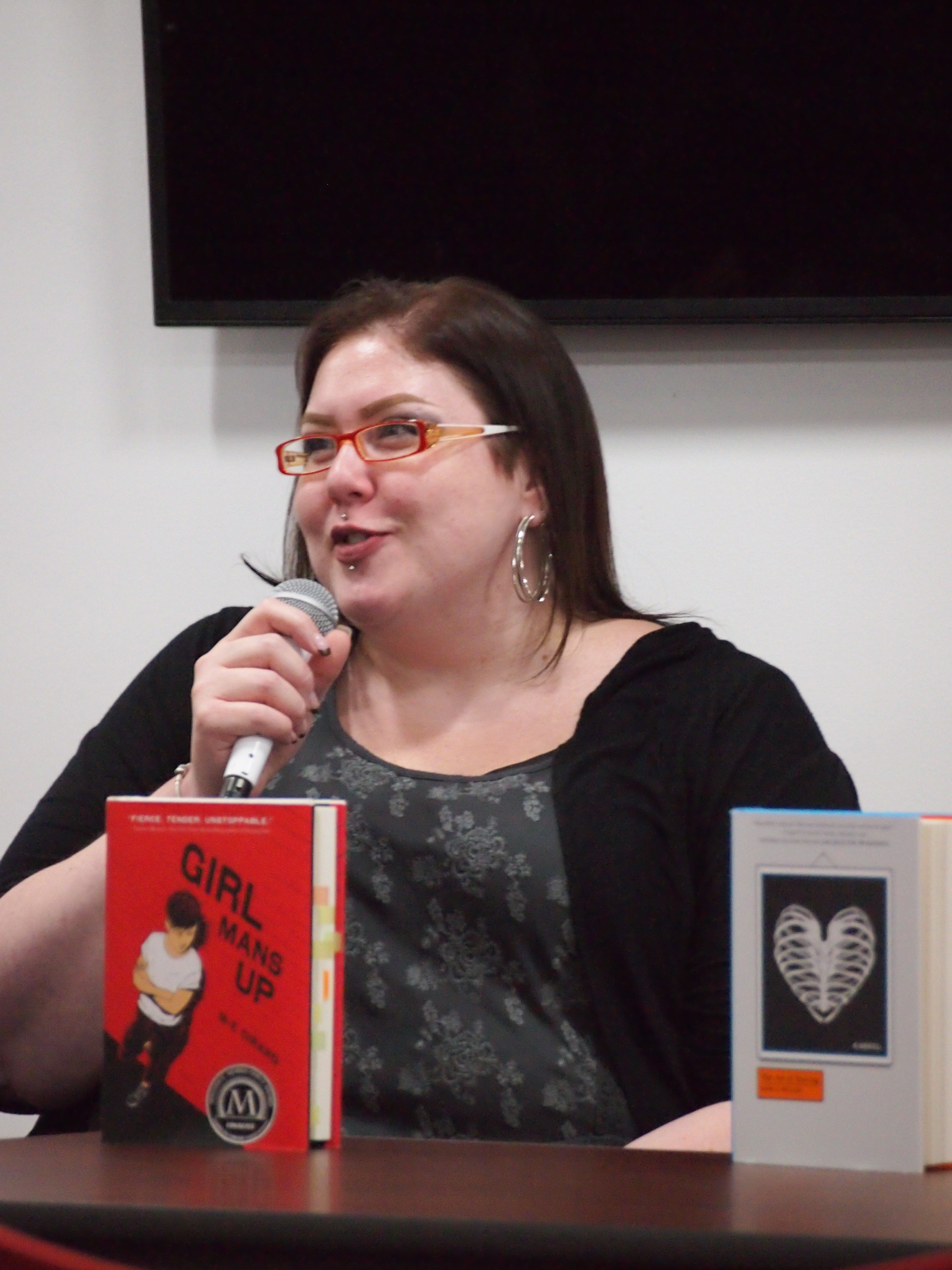
- Writing career
- Genre: young adult novel
- Notable work: Girl Mans Up

M-E Girard is a Canadian writer whose debut young adult novel Girl Mans Up was published in 2016.

The novel won the Lambda Literary Award for LGBT Children's and Young Adult Literature at the 29th Lambda Literary Awards in 2017. The book was also a shortlisted finalist for the American Library Association's William C. Morris Award and the Kobo Emerging Writer Prize in 2017.

In 2023, she published another book, Then Everything Happens at Once, about a teen dealing with a love triangle during COVID-19 lockdowns.
