= Adib Khorram =

American author

Adib Khorram is an Iranian-American author who mainly writes young adult fiction. He is most well-known for his 2018 book Darius the Great is Not Okay, which won the 2019 YALSA William C. Morris Award and the Asian/Pacific American Award for Literature. The sequel, Darius the Great Deserves Better, earned a 2021 Stonewall Honor.

== Career ==
Khorram studied technical theater and design at Southern Illinois University before attending Vancouver Film School.

Khorram published his first novel, Darius the Great Is Not Okay, in 2018, followed by the sequel, Darius the Great Deserves Better, in 2020. In 2021, Khorram published his first picture book, Seven Special Somethings, and narrated the audiobook. His first Adult Romance, I'll Have What He's Having, released from Forever in 2024, followed by two more books in the Love on the Vine series.

== Accolades ==
- 2019: William C. Morris YA Debut Award
- 2019: Asian/Pacific American Award for Young Adult Literature
- 2019: Boston Globe–Horn Book Award Fiction and Poetry Honoree
- 2021: Stonewall Honor

== Personal life ==
Khorram was born and raised in Kansas City, Missouri, where he still lives. He is gay and biracial, the son of an American mother and Iranian father. His family practice the Baháʼí Faith.
