= Rae Carson =

American fantasy writer (born 1973)

- Born: Rae Dawn Carson; August 17, 1973 (age 53); Oakland, California, U.S.
- Education: Livermore High School; Biola University
- Occupation: Author
- Spouse: Charles Coleman Finlay (m. 2007)
- Writing career
- Genre: Fantasy
- Website: raecarson.com

Rae Dawn Carson (born August 17, 1973, in Oakland, California) is an American fantasy writer. Her debut novel, The Girl of Fire and Thorns, was published in 2011. Her books have also been translated into languages around the world. Beginning in 2017, she has written several tie-in stories for the Star Wars universe, including the official novelization of The Rise of Skywalker.

== Biography ==
Carson was born August 17, 1973, in Oakland, California. She attended Livermore High School and graduated from Biola University in 1995.

Carson joined the Online Writers Workshop (OWW) in 2004 and published her first story, "First Waltz," in 2006. She published her debut novel, The Girl of Fire and Thorns, in 2011.

In 2007, Carson married science fiction writer Charles Coleman Finlay, whom she met through OWW. After their marriage, Carson moved to Columbus, Ohio, to live with Finlay and his two sons.

Before writing full-time, Carson worked for the president of Ohio State University.

== Awards and honors ==
The Girl of Fire and Thorns books were a New York Times bestselling series in September 2013.

Awards for Carson's writing
Year	Title	Award	Result	Ref.
2011	The Girl of Fire and Thorns	Cybils Award for Young Adult Speculative Fiction	Finalist	
2012	The Girl of Fire and Thorns	ALA Best Fiction for Young Adults	Top 10	
2012	The Girl of Fire and Thorns	Andre Norton Award	Finalist	
2012	The Girl of Fire and Thorns	Locus Award for Best First Novel	Finalist	
2012	The Girl of Fire and Thorns	Ohioana Book Award for Young Adult Literature	Winner	
2012	The Girl of Fire and Thorns	William C. Morris Award	Finalist	
2013	The Crown of Embers	Locus Award for Best Young Adult Book	Finalist	
2015	Walk on Earth a Stranger	National Book Award for Young People's Literature	Longlist	
2020	"Badass Moms in the Zombie Apocalypse"	Nebula Award for Best Short Story	Finalist	
2021	The Rise of Skywalker	Scribe Award for Adapted Novel — General & Speculative	Finalist	
2021	"Badass Moms in the Zombie Apocalypse"	Hugo Award for Best Short Story	Finalist	
2021	"Badass Moms in the Zombie Apocalypse"	Locus Award for Best Short Story	Finalist	
2022	"Badass Moms in the Zombie Apocalypse"	Ignotus Award for Cuento extranjero (Foreign Story)	Finalist	

== Publications ==
=== Novels ===
==== The Girl of Fire and Thorns series ====
1. The Girl of Fire and Thorns, 2011
2. Crown of Embers, 2012
3. The Bitter Kingdom, 2013
4. The Empire of Dreams, 2020

The following books are prequel novellas to the series:

1. The Shadow Cats, 2012
2. The Shattered Mountain, 2013
3. The King's Guard, 2013

==== The Gold Seer trilogy ====
- Walk on Earth a Stranger, 2015
- Like a River Glorious, 2016
- Into the Bright Unknown, 2017

==== Standalone books ====
- Any Sign of Life, 2021

=== Short fiction ===
- "Omega Ship", in Three Sides of a Heart: Stories About Love Triangles, ed. by Natalie C. Parker, 2017
- "Badass Moms in the Zombie Apocalypse", in Uncanny Magazine, Jan-Feb 2020, ed. by Lynne M. Thomas and Michael Damian Thomas

=== Star Wars Universe ===
- "The Red One"; Star Wars: From a Certain Point of View (October 2017)
- "Hear Nothing, See Nothing, Say Nothing"; Star Wars: Canto Bight (December 2017)
- Most Wanted (2018)
- Star Wars: The Rise of Skywalker: Expanded Edition (2020)

=== Critical studies, reviews and biography ===
- Bond, Gwenda (Dec 2013). "Locus Looks at Books : Divers Hands". Locus (635): 22–23. Review of The bitter kingdom.
