= Thanatos (Hades) =

Hades character

- Hades character
- Thanatos in Hades
- First appearance: Hades (2020)
- Created by: Greg Kasavin
- Designed by: Jen Zee
- Voiced by: Chris Saphire

Thanatos is a character in the 2020 video game Hades. He is based on the Greek mythological figure of the same name, who is described as a "peaceful death." He is dispatched by the game's antagonist, Hades, to prevent Zagreus from leaving, and challenges him to see who could defeat the most enemies. This competition was inspired by the competition between Gimli and Legolas in The Lord of the Rings: The Two Towers. He was created by Greg Kasavin and designed by Jen Zee. To match the "peaceful death" concept, actor Chris Saphire was cast. He was one of the first characters added to the game, and served as the model for multiple characters' 3D models. He has received generally positive reception, praised for his relationship with Zagreus as well as the polyamorous relationship between him, Zagreus, and Megaera.

== Appearances ==
Thanatos is a character in the video game Hades. He is first encountered during Zagreus' escape from the Underworld in Elysium, dispatched after Megaera becomes unable to prevent Zagreus' escape. He chides Zagreus for leaving, challenging him to see who can kill the most enemies. The two have a past as childhood friends, with Zagreus being one of the only friends he had. Zagreus can pursue a romantic relationship with Thanatos; this relationship can become a polyamorous one if Zagreus also pursues Megaera.

== Concept and creation ==
Thanatos is based on the god of the same name in Greek mythology. He was created by Greg Kasavin and designed by Jen Zee. Kasavin viewed the setting as a good opportunity to feature "lesser-known but compelling characters" like Thanatos, who was one of the first characters added to the game. He also changed little during development, among the least changed in the game. Kasavin stated that there was little in the way of mythology surrounding Thanatos, which gave them "fertile ground" to work with when creating their incarnation. When making characters in 3D in the game, 3D artist Paige Carter used either Thanatos or Megaera as the basis. When asked why Thanatos and other characters in the game were so attractive, Kasavin attributed this to Jen Zee, the game's character artist. He stated that the portrayal of Thanatos and the rest "owe greatly to classical tradition," which Zee cared about. He added that they justified the gods being hot by virtue of them being gods. Commenting on Thanatos' looks, Kasavin felt that his beauty was "effortlessly incidental," arguing that a character who represents the concept of Death couldn't be anything other than beautiful. The competition between Thanatos and Zagreus was inspired by the competition in The Lord of the Rings: The Two Towers between Gimli and Legolas. He was given the ability to teleport so he could "leave in a huff, and leave conversations hanging."

Kasavin touched upon the possible polyamorous relationship between Thanatos, Zagreus, and Megaera, noting that it was something that developed over time instead of being present from the beginning. He discussed that polyamory would make sense for gods, as they did not face the same challenges as mortals, though he noted that polyamory fit the Ancient Greece setting as well.

Because the mythological Thanatos is described as a "peaceful death," the team at Supergiant Games cast actor Chris Saphire to play a "gentle" version of the grim reaper.

== Reception ==
Thanatos has received generally positive reception. Polygon writer Patricia Hernandez discussed how, having seen fan content depicting Zagreus and Thanatos in a romantic relationship before encountering him in-game, she found herself interpreting him as a jilted lover upset over Zagreus leaving. When asked, Kasavin said that this was not the intention of his initial discontent over Zagreus' departure, but instead to show the closeness of the two and serving as the catalyst for their feelings eventually developing. Hernandez nonetheless found their initial exchange in the game provocative, arguing that it was able to establish a history between them in only a few lines. She found his initial encounter, where he challenges Zagreus to a competition of who can kill the most enemies, to be compelling, as no other encounter works this way. She felt that the dynamic remains "juicy and charged" regardless of whether Zagreus wins or loses, saying that it felt "inherently hot and audacious" for Zagreus to try to "show up death himself." Hernandez argued that the pairing was the most popular in the Hades fandom, and felt that Thanatos was one of the most memorable encounters she's had in a video game. Kotaku writer Ash Parrish discussed how attractive she found Thanatos, describing his voice as sounding like a "petulant ex-lover" and describing him as "tall, dark, adeath incarnate."

His relationship with Zagreus was discussed and praised by critics. Paste writer Elijah Gonzales discussed how the game handles Thanatos' relationship with Zagreus, particularly how Zagreus' attempt to escape the Underworld affects him. Wired writer Gabriel Aikins discussed the polyamory between Thanatos, Zagreus, and Megaera, arguing that polyamorous relationships were a rarity in media, games or otherwise. Siliconera writer Kazuma Hashimoto enjoyed Thanatos, particularly the relationship he had with Zagreus. As a gay man, he appreciated the quality of writing of the relationship between the two, finding they had a natural interaction and great chemistry. Fellow Wired writer Autumn Wright discussed how Zagreus contrasted with Thanatos, describing Zagreus as ephebe and Thanatos as twinkish. They felt that Thanatos represented a "subvers[ion] to classical tradition," and that his relationship would be demeaning in Ancient Greece. The Mary Sue writer Briana Lawrence found the relationship between Thanatos, Zagreus, and Megaera surprising, enjoying too that they all got along with one another. Gayming Mag writer Aimee Hart felt that he contrasted with Zagreus, describing Thanatos as "cold, calculated, and silent" and Zagreus as "reckless and warm."
