= Isabel Ibañez =

Bolivian-American author and illustrator

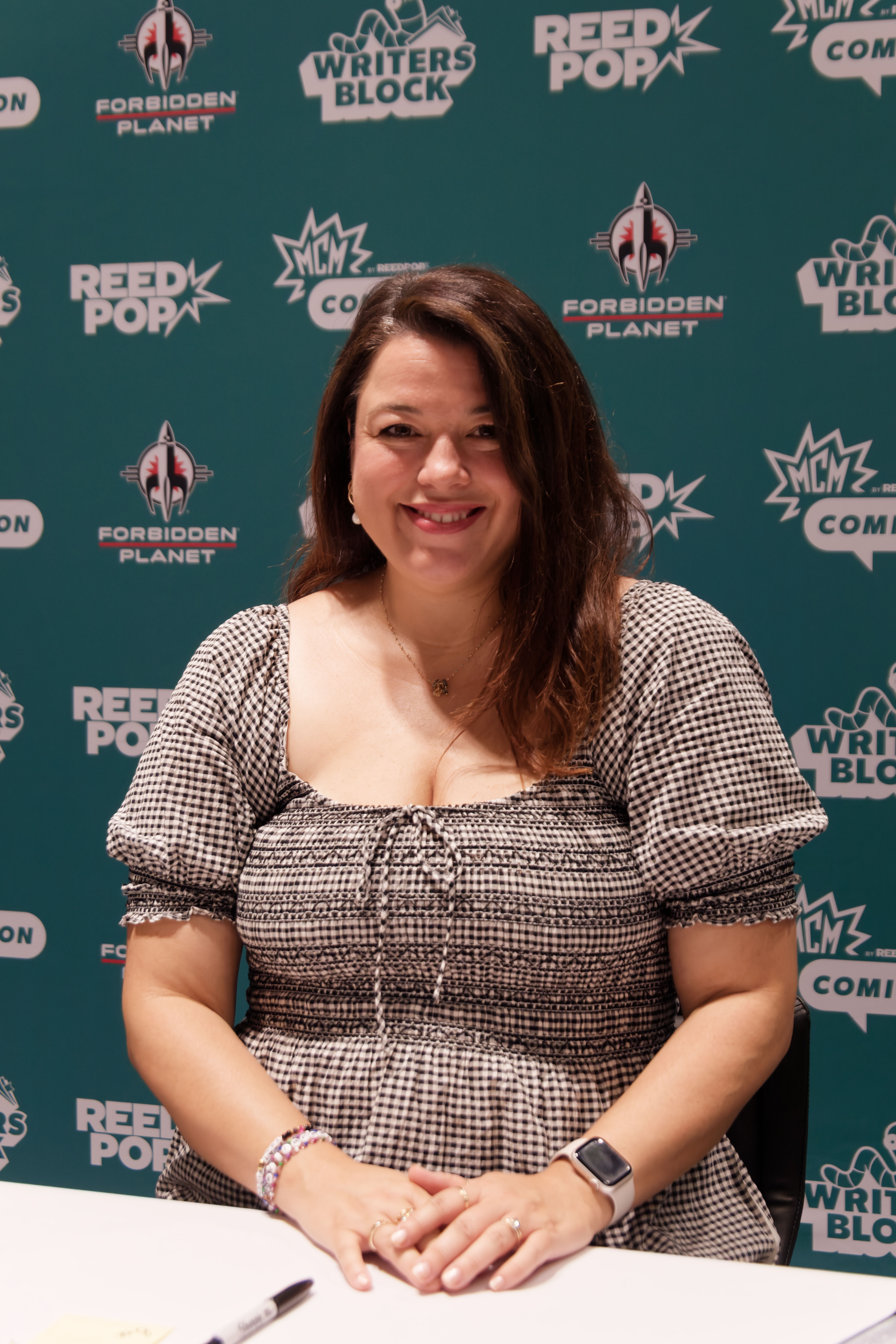
- Ibañez at the 2026 MCM London Comic Con
- Occupation: Novelist
- Writing career
- Language: English
- Genre: Fiction
- Website: isabelibanez.com

Isabel Ibañez is a Bolivian American New York Times-bestselling author and illustrator, best known for her young adult historical fantasy debut Woven in Moonlight.

== Personal life ==
Ibañez is also an illustrator and was ultimately accepted to illustrate the cover of her own debut novel, Woven in Moonlight. Her favorite author is Juliet Marillier and her favorite book is Uprooted by Naomi Novik.

She lives in Asheville, North Carolina, with her husband and dog.

== Works ==
Spellbound Histories Quartet

1. Graceless Heart (2026)
2. Witch Dance (2027)
3. Untitled Third Book
4. Untitled Fourth Book

Secrets of the Nile Duology

1. What the River Knows
2. Where the Library Hides

Standalones

Together We Burn

== Woven in Moonlight ==
Ibañez incorporated the common Bolivian practice of weaving into the magic system in the novel, which ultimately was the catalyst for setting the novel in a Bolivian-inspired world. She wanted the magic to feel authentic and natural to the fictionalized culture. Some of the themes reference the current political climate in Bolivia. It was listed by TIME magazine as one of the 100 best fantasy novels of all time. The book was also a finalist for the William C. Morris Award.
