= Alicia D. Williams =

American writer (born 1970)

Alicia Diane Williams
- Born: September 26, 1970 (age 56)
- Education: Hamline University
- Occupation: Novelist

Alicia Diane Williams (born September 26, 1970) is an American author and teacher. Her debut novel, Genesis Begins Again, published in 2019, received wide praise and won a Newbery Honor, the Coretta Scott King-John Steptoe Award for New Talent, and was a finalist for the William C. Morris Award and Kirkus Prize for Young Readers Literature.

== Early life ==
Alicia D. Williams grew up in Detroit, Michigan. After graduating high school, Alicia went on to attend the University of Kentucky and majored in African American Studies. She received her BA in 1994, and went on to New York City, where she trained in theatre at the American Musical and Dramatic Academy. While living in New York, Alicia performed in plays, commercials, sketch comedy, and stand-up comedy. Wanting a change, she moved back to Detroit, where she eventually found a job as a flight attendant and was stationed in Charlotte, North Carolina.

In 1999, Williams had a daughter, Nailah, and she returned to working with the theater and writing "one-woman historical shows".

== Career as a writer ==
In 2009, having promised herself she would write a book, she began attending writing conferences. In 2012, Alicia began graduate school at Hamline University. After graduating, she kept working on the manuscript for several years while being employed as a Teaching Artist in Charlotte, North Carolina. In 2015, Alicia completed her manuscript Genesis Begins Again and the book was published in January 2019 by Simon & Schuster/Atheneum Books for Young Readers.

Williams' book was generally praised by critics. She was awarded a Newbery Honor and the Coretta Scott King-John Steptoe Award for New Talent in 2020. The novel was also a finalist for the William C. Morris Award and the Kirkus Prize for Young Readers Literature.

Her 2021 book, Shirley Chisholm Dared: The Story of the First Black Woman in Congress, won the Jane Addams Children's Book Award.

Her 2024 book, Mid-Air, was longlisted for the National Book Award for Young People's Literature.

== Selected works ==
- Williams, Alicia (2019). Genesis Begins Again (1st ed.). New York: Atheneum/Caitlyn Dlouhy Books. p. 384. ISBN 978-1481465809.
- Williams, Alicia (2021). Jump at the Sun: The True Life Tale of Unstoppable Storycatcher Zora Neale Hurston (1st ed.). New York: Atheneum/Caitlyn Dlouhy Books. ISBN 978-1534419131.
- Williams, Alicia (2021). Shirley Chisholm: The Story of the First Black Woman in Congress (1st ed.). New York: Penguin Random House/Anne Schwartz Books. ISBN 978-0593123683.
