= Darius the Great Is Not Okay =

2018 young adult novel by Adib Khorram

- Author: Adib Khorram
- Cover artist: Samira Iravani and Adams Carvalho
- Language: English
- Series: Darius the Great
- Subject: Depression, friendship, grandparents, Iranian-Americans, Persian-Americans
- Genre: Young adult fiction
- Publisher: Dial Press
- English publication date: August 28, 2018
- Media type: Print
- Pages: 320
- ISBN: 9780525552963
- Followed by: Darius the Great Deserves Better

Darius the Great Is Not Okay is a young adult novel by Adib Khorram, originally published August 28, 2018, by Dial Books. The book has received various awards and has been translated into eight languages from the book's original language English (Russian, Japanese, German, Spanish, Portuguese, French, Italian, and Dutch). Darius the Great Is Not Okay follows the personal journey of Darius Kellner, an Iranian–American teenager with clinical depression, as he makes a best friend for life, reconnects with his grandparents, and repairs his relationship with his father.

== Plot ==
Darius Kellner, an Iranian–American teenager, lives in Portland, Oregon. He loves Star Trek, tea, and his little sister, Laleh. Darius struggles with bullies, depression, a lack of friends, and his disapproving dad, Stephen Kellner.

Stephen believes that it's partially Darius's fault for being bullied, since he makes himself more of a target. He dislikes Darius's hair length. Stephen also has clinical depression. The main time they spend with each other is when they both watch an episode of Star Trek each night.

Upon discovering his babou (Darius's maternal grandfather) has a brain tumor, the family decides to take a trip to the desert city of Yazd, Iran, where Darius's grandparents live. Darius has not seen his grandparents in a long time, and has only talked to them through video calls, but Darius speaks little Persian compared to his mom and sister, so he easily gets lost in the conversations. Upon arriving, Darius instantly connects with his mamou (grandmother), but struggles to get to know his babou.

Darius meets Sohrab, the son of one of Babou's neighbors. Sohrab invites him to play football, which Darius enjoys, but while showering after the game, other boys make fun of Darius' penis, calling it "Ayatollah", and Sohrab joins in. This leads to Darius leaving and having a breakdown, but Sohrab comes to apologize later in the day. Sohrab and Darius continue to bond as they hang out and begin to play football frequently. Darius feels comfortable around Sohrab; Darius feels like he can be himself around him. They often visit a rooftop (pictured in the cover) that provides a view of the city and an isolated place to talk.

Darius becomes frustrated when Laleh begins watching Star Trek with Stephen—the only thing that Darius and Stephen had together—and started without him, because he's already seen the episodes. Darius feels that Laleh is his better replacement. Darius receives an Iranian national football team jersey as a present from Sohrab, which he loves as it makes him feel like a true Persian and feel like he fits in. His family visits multiple sights of Yazd and Iran throughout the book, including Persopolis, Tower of Silence, Jameh Mosque, and the Fire Temple of Yazd.

In a few days before Darius and his family must leave Iran, Darius decides to buy Sohrab a pair of cleats as a gift. He visits the house to find their family in grief. Sohrab lashes out at Darius before revealing his father has just died (who was previously revealed to be jailed by the Iranian government for unknown reasons). Sohrab complains that Darius is always crying but has nothing to be sad for, and tells him to leave. Darius runs to the rooftop and cries.

Darius' dad finds him. They open up emotionally to each other: Stephen tells him of how he was close to suicide when Darius was young, and went on pills to prevent it. He states, "Suicide isn't the only way you can lose someone to depression." Darius explains why he was upset about Star Trek, and how he feels that Stephen thinks Darius was disappointment to him. Stephen reassures him that he loves him.

Sohrab apologizes to Darius, saying that since he was hurting, he wanted Darius to hurt too. They end on good terms and the family leaves Iran. Back in Portland, Darius has a better relationship with his dad, has frequent video calls with Sohrab and Mamou, is feeling more confident at school, and is motivated to try out for his school's soccer team.

== Reception ==
Darius the Great Is Not Okay received starred reviews from School Library Journal, Publishers Weekly, and Kirkus, as well as positive reviews from The New York Times, BookPage, Entertainment Weekly, and Booklist.

=== Accolades ===
Accolades for Darius the Great Is Not Okay
Year	Accolade	Result	Ref.
N/A	Junior Library Guild	Selection	
2018	BuzzFeed's 24 Best YA Books Of 2018	Selection	
2018	BookBub's 30 of the Best Young Adult Books of 2018	Selection	
2018	Indigo's Top 10 Best Teen Books of 2018	Selection	
2018	New York Public Library's Best Books for Teens	Selection	
2018	Publishers Weekly Best Books for Young Adults	Selection	
2018	Time Best YA and Kids Books of 2018	Selection	
2019	Amelia Elizabeth Walden Award	Finalist	
2019	Asian/Pacific American Award for Literature for Young Adult Literature	Winner	
2019	Boston Globe-Horn Book Award for Fiction & Poetry	Honor	
2019	Cooperative Children's Book Center Choice: Fiction for Young Adults	Selection	
2019	Capitol Choices: Noteworthy Books for Children and Teens	Selection	
2019	Heartland Booksellers Award for Young Adult/Middle Grade	Winner	
2019	Indies Choice Award for Young Adult	Finalist	
2019	Lambda Literary Award for LGBTQ Children's/Young Adult	Nominee	
2019	Middle East Book Award for Youth Literature	Winner	
2019	Rainbow List	Top 10	
2019	William C. Morris YA Debut Award	Winner	
2019	YALSA's Best Fiction for Young Adults	Top 10	
2020	Rhode Island Teen Book Award	Nominee	
2021	Lincoln Award	Nominee	
2021	Time 100 Best YA Books of All Time	Selection	

== Adaptation ==
Universal purchased the rights to adapt Darius the Great Is Not Okay in a motion picture to be produced by Todd Lieberman and David Hoberman's Mandeville Films. The book will be adapted by Kevin Hamedani and Travis Betz.
