= Wonder Show =

2012 young adult novel by Hannah Barnaby

- First edition
- Author: Hannah Barnaby
- Language: English
- Genre: Young adult
- Published: 2012, Houghton Mifflin Harcourt
- Publication place: United States
- Media type: Print, e-book
- Pages: 288 pages

Wonder Show is the 2012 young adult debut novel of American writer Hannah Barnaby. The book was first published on 20 March 2012 in hardback and e-book formats, and was subsequently released in paperback on 8 October 2013. The work was a finalist for the 2013 William C. Morris Award. The book is set in the late 1930s and is told from multiple points of view, but primarily follows a young teen that decides to join a circus in hopes of finding her long missing father.

== Synopsis ==
When her aunt leaves her at the McGreavey Home for Wayward Girls, thirteen-year-old Portia begins to plan her escape, despite the owner "Mister" saying that she would never be able to escape his grasp. She's desperate to know what happened to her father Max, and as she believes that he left home to join the circus, Portia decides that the best way to find him is to join a carnival, Mosco's Traveling Wonder Show. Once there, Portia begins to slowly connect and form a family with the people around her, even as her attempts to locate her father never seem to come to fruition. Portia soon finds that not only is Mister keen on having her return to the home, but that the answers to her questions surrounding her father might just be at McGreavey's.

== Development ==
Barnaby was inspired to create Wonder Show based upon her childhood experiences, as she would frequently attend the Ringling Bros. and Barnum & Bailey Circus and on one occasion, was selected as a "Queen for the Day". Years later Barnaby began to research circus culture for the book while taking part in the Boston Public Library's Children’s Writer-in-Residence program, where she found that circus people did not freely associate with carnival people and that "They all had their own codes of conduct and it seemed like the social segregations that still exist. It was almost like cliques in school.” During this time she completed her first draft, but put the book aside for about two years due to her personal life and responsibilities as a teacher and parent. She resumed working on the novel after one of the Boston Public Library grant judges asked after the novel. Barnaby continued working on Wonder Show for an additional five years before the book was acquired.

== Reception ==
Critical reception for Wonder Show has been primarily positive. Multiple reviewers for the School Library Journal praised the work, and one marked it as a "Favorite Book Read in 2013". The Horn Book Guide and the Richmond Times Dispatch both gave favorable reviews for Wonder Show, and the Richmond Times Dispatch praised Barnaby's writing as mesmerizing.

=== Awards ===
- William C. Morris Award (2013, finalist)
- YALSA's Best Fiction for Young Adults (2013)
- Arkansas Teen Book Awards (2013/2014, won)
