= Girl Mans Up =

2016 novel by M-E Girard

- First edition
- Author: M-E Girard
- Language: English
- Genre: Coming-of-age story
- Publisher: HarperCollins
- Publication date: 6 September 2016
- Publication place: Canada
- Pages: 373
- Awards: Lambda Literary Award for Children's and Young Adult Literature
- ISBN: 978-0-0624-0419-0

Girl Mans Up is a coming-of-age novel written by M-E Girard and published by HarperCollins in 2016. The book tells the story of Penelope Oliveira, a queer Portuguese American teenager who struggles to find people who will accept her for who she is.

== Reception ==
Kirkus Reviews praised Pen's character, calling her a "strong genderqueer lesbian character, imperfect, independent, and deserving of every cheer." Jen Doll, writing for The New York Times, called the novel a compulsive read, and spoke positively about Pen, whom Doll considered to be "an inspiration to anyone who's struggled to be understood".

In her review for The Horn Book Magazine, Claire Gross comments on the design of some of the characters in the novel, especially Pen's parents, whom she considers to be "a bit too close to immigrant stereotypes", as well as Pen's girlfriend, Blake, as being generic. Despite that, Gross still praises the story presented in the novel, including its "nuanced drama built on themes of identity, respect, and the desire to be recognized for who you are."

Girl Mans Up was a finalist in the William C. Morris YA Debut Award and received the Lambda Literary Award for Children's and Young Adult Literature in 2017.

In 2023, the book was banned in Clay County District Schools.
