= The Girl of Fire and Thorns =

2011 young adult novel by Rae Carson

- First edition
- Author: Rae Carson
- Cover artist: Lara Jade and Sammy Yuen
- Language: English
- Series: The Fire and Thorns Trilogy
- Genre: Young adult Romance; Fantasy
- Publisher: Greenwillow Books
- Publication date: September 2011
- Publication place: United States
- Media type: Print (hardback), audiobook
- Pages: 423
- Followed by: The Crown of Embers

The Girl of Fire and Thorns is the debut novel of author Rae Carson, published by Greenwillow Books, an imprint of HarperCollins. It is the first novel of the Fire and Thorns trilogy, followed by The Crown of Embers (2012) and The Bitter Kingdom (2013).

== Plot ==
The Princess of Orovalle, Lucero-Elisa de Riqueza, was born as the chosen one, selected by God to fulfill a prophecy shown by a blue gem in her navel called the Godstone. Lucero-Elisa lacks confidence in herself, and often eats out of unhappiness; she is described as "fat" in the novel. On her sixteenth birthday, Lucero-Elisa is married to King Alejandro de Vega of Joya d'Arena, a country soon to be at war with Invierne. While traveling to Joya d'Arena, Elisa's caravan is attacked. Elisa, who has studied military history, provides sound military advice about the conflict, rescues herself and her companions, and saves the king's life, but her companion Aneaxi dies of injuries sustained in the attack, leaving her with one ally, her nurse and bodyguard, Ximena.

When they arrive at Alejandro's palace, the King announces Elisa as princess and special guest, but conceals his marriage, and her Godstone. For some weeks, Elisa lives at the Palace as a "guest", making connections with the local priest, Alejandro's friend, and Alejandro's son, Prince Rosario. She is also forced to contend with a rival, Condesa Ariña, the king's mistress, and Ariña's maid, Cosmé. While at court, Elisa is asked to advise the king's Council about war, as well as to keep watch on his court. Elisa comes to learn that she was raised by a religious sect that believed in keeping her ignorant about her Godstone. Cosmé accidentally discovers Elisa's identity as bearer of the Godstone, and arranges for her to be kidnapped. They travel for a month across the desert, facing harsh conditions, and Elisa is pleased to have lost weight and have more physical endurance.

When they arrive at their destination, Elisa is informed that the war has been under way for many years, and that Alejandro is a "weak king," who has not been willing to protect the desert villagers. She also learns that her kidnappers believe that her Godstone will be able to use sorcery to battle the powerful sorcerers of Invierne, the animagi.

Elisa sees that the people of Joya are unprepared for war. To learn more of the army of Invierne, she, Cosmé, Humberto, and two others go to observe them from a cave hideout. The Invierno army decides to investigate the cave one day and the group flees, leaving Elisa hidden behind because she will only slow them down. Elisa is captured, and taken to an Animagi who wears a Godstone around his neck. She plays dumb and tricks him into sipping a drug to knock him out. She dons his robes and Godstone pendant and escapes, burning the Animagi in his tent. Elisa finds Humberto using her Godstone, and he nurses her back to health.

Later, a message states that the Conde Treviño, the father of Condesa Ariña, wishes to discuss an alliance with the Malficio, the group Elisa has created to conquer the Invierne. They travel to his village only to discover he has allied with the Invierne. He demands Elisa tell him where the camp is, while everyone else is held captive in his home. When Elisa refuses to give information, he kills Humberto and throws Elisa in the cell with the rest of her party. King Alejandro's men show up and break Elisa and the rest out of the cell. They escort them back to King Alejandro's palace, where Elisa is re-introduced to the king as the leader of the Malficio. The King is shocked to discover it is her, and finally announces that she is queen. At the palace, Elisa discovers her potted plant with the Godstones is missing from her room. She asks Prince Rosario to locate them for her. Days later, the army of Invierne marches in against Joya d'Arena. Elisa receives a message from Cosmé that five animagi are headed towards the palace escorted by the Invierne army. The army breaks through the palace's defenses and kills Condesa Ariña and severely injures the King. Elisa's nurses quickly plan to flee with Elisa and the Prince, but the animagi break in. Elisa steps up as the bearer of the Godstone to save her nurses, and, getting the Godstones from Prince Rosario, which he found in Ariña's room, places all four plus her own into the pendant she stole from the first animagus she encountered. This sets off an explosion that destroys all the animagi. The King dies from his wounds, and Elisa becomes queen of Joya. She is prepared for the tasks to come that God has set out for her.

== Characters ==
- Lucero-Elisa: The heroine of the story, known as Elisa. She is the chosen one, the bearer of the Godstone, set to perform an as-yet unknown act of service and fulfill a prophecy set by God. She is married off to King Alejandro of Joya d'Arena to help his country at war. She also fell in love with Humberto just before he was killed.
- King Alejandro: The King of Joya d'Arena and husband of the girl.
- Cosmé: Worked in the palace as a maid but is actually a member of a hidden rebel village in the hill country on the other side of the desert. She captures Elisa to bring the Godstone bearer to her people, who suffer the depredations of the army of Invierne without help from the King or from Conde Treviño.
- Humberto: Cosmé's brother. He helps with the kidnapping and is very kind to Elisa. He reveals that he has feelings for her.
- Ximena: Elisa's nurse and guardian. Trained as a scribe, she has raised Elisa as a little girl, and has secret abilities of the art of assassination.
- Condesa Ariña: Alejandro's mistress. She is the daughter of Conde Treviño, a traitor who secretly has a treaty with Invierne.
- Prince Rosario: The young son of King Alejandro and his late wife, Queen Rosaura. He is adopted by Elisa after the death of his father.
- Lord Hector: King Alejandro's personal guard and man-at-arms. He is the one who finds Elisa in Conde Treviño's place.
- Father Nicandro: A priest who informs Elisa about Homer's Afflatus. He gives her a bag of three Godstones that his monastery watched over.
- Father Alentín: A priest and Cosmé's uncle. He asked Cosmé to bring the Godstone bearer to the village to assist in the war.
- Juana-Alodia: Elisa's older sister, the future queen of Orova lle.
- Aneaxi: Elisa's lady-in-waiting. She dies after the attack in the forest to a broken leg and an untreated gash above her ankle that became infected.

== Reception ==
The book generally received positive reviews, with Publishers Weekly calling the characters "stellar" and Booklist saying the book was "thought-provoking". It was a finalist in 2012 for the William C. Morris YA Award. It was also selected as 2012 Top Ten Best Fiction for Young Adults by Young Adult Library Services Association. It was nominated for the 2011 Andre Norton Award.
