= Dusa =

Hades character

- Hades character
- Dusa in Hades
- First appearance: Hades (2020)
- Created by: Greg Kasavin
- Designed by: Jen Zee
- Voiced by: Courtney Vineys

Dusa is a character in the 2020 video game Hades. She is a maid who serves Hades, and who periodically interacts with the protagonist, Zagreus, in addition to the character Megaera. She was created by Greg Kasavin and designed by Jen Zee, with her design made attractive due to Zee's desire to appreciate "classical tradition" and the mindset that gods are beautiful because they are gods. She is voiced by Courtney Vineys. During the game, the player may have Zagreus pursue her romantically, only for Dusa to turn out to not share these feelings and possibly not having romantic feelings at all, instead forming a platonic love for one another. This has been well-received, with critics noting how her being asexual and aromantic was a rarity. She has also been praised for her design and voice.

== Concept and creation ==
Dusa is based on the Greek mythological figure Medusa. She is a floating gorgon head with green skin and snakes for hair who carries a feather duster while she works as a maid in the House of Hades. She was designed by Hades character designer Jen Zee and created by creative director Greg Kasavin. On the subject of the attractiveness of Dusa and other characters in the game, Kasavin attributed this to Jen Zee, the game's character artist. He stated that the portrayal of Dusa and the rest "owe greatly to classical tradition," which Zee cared about. He added that they justified the gods being hot by virtue of them being gods. While she was originally a comic relief character, Kasavin stated that her popularity led to her being made more significant. Later in the game's development, Dusa was given additional dialogue through a patch. She is voiced by Courtney Vineys, who previously voiced the character Ti'zo from Pyre. According to Waypoint writer Elizabeth Ballou, she was a good fit for Dusa due to her history of voicing "cute, puckish creatures" like Ti'zo and Dusa.

== Appearances ==
Dusa appears as a non-playable character in the video game Hades. She works as a maid in the House of Hades for Hades, and can have conversations with various characters, including the protagonist Zagreus and another character named Megaera. Zagreus may pursue her romantically, and while she appears to have a crush on him, she ultimately comes to the conclusion that she does not have romantic feelings for Zagreus, and may not have such feelings for anyone, instead choosing to be friends with one another.

== Reception ==
Dusa has received generally positive reception. Authors Jane Draycott and Kate Cook discussed how, despite some characters being sexualized, monsters like Dusa are not, noting how she and other gorgons are the only female monsters in the game. They noted that, despite Dusa being a monster, she did not behave monstrously.

Her sexuality has been the subject of discussion. Automaton writer Taijiro Yamanaka found Dusa to be a particularly attractive character, praising her voice acting for expressing her "hard-working personality" and commenting how her shyness made her feel cute. As part of a celebration of fictional asexual characters in television and video games for Ace Week, GLAAD writer Adam Weinreb considered Dusa among their favorites, identifying her as both asexual and aromantic. Meristation writer Laura Luna and Wired writer Gabriel Aikins commented that Dusa lacking romantic interest was a rarity in digital media. Super Jump Magazine writer Antony Terence considered Dusa a standout character in the game's cast, finding her interactions with Zagreus, particularly when receiving gifts, to be precious. Game Informer writer Liana Ruppert discussed her relationship with Zagreus, talking about how adorable and pure she is. She commented on how she couldn't bring herself to attempt to romance Dusa as she saw her as a sister, while stating how odd it was that she turned out to not be interested in Zagreus considering their interactions. She also felt that the interactions between her and Megaera were adorable. The Mary Sue writer Briana Lawrence appreciated the relationship between Dusa and Zagreus, particularly how the friendship between them develops the same way as the romantic relationships with Thanatos and Megaera do. Lawrence also discussed the relationship between Dusa and Megaera, feeling that Megaera has the same platonic love for Dusa that Zagreus has for Dusa. Gayming Mag writer Aimee Hart discussed Dusa as a romance option for Zagreus, appreciating how, once Dusa declined Zagreus' advances, they established a strong platonic relationship. She described Dusa as "too sweet for this world" and an "incredibly charming character."
