= I Want to Be a Wall =

Manga by Honami Shirono

わたしは壁になりたい
- Manga
- Written by: Honami Shirono, Emma Schumacker (translator)
- Published by: Kadokawa
- English publisher: NA: Yen Press
- Original run: December 1, 2020 – April 1, 2023
- Volumes: 3

I Want to Be a Wall is a manga by Honami Shirono. It follows an aromantic asexual woman and a gay man who enter a lavender marriage together. Originally published from 2020 to 2023 across three volumes by Kadokawa, an English translation by Emma Schumacker was published by Yen Press from 2022 to 2024.

== Synopsis ==
Yuriko, an aromantic asexual woman, and Gakurouta, a closeted gay man, marry each other. Despite their mutual lack of romantic attraction to one another, Yuriko, who is invested in Boys' Love manga, and Gakurouta, who secretly yearns for his childhood friend, an unmarried heterosexual gardener named Sousuke, are determined to make their marriage work and the two gradually form a close platonic bond.

== Release ==
The manga consists of three volumes.

Vol.	Release Date (original)	Release Date (English)
1	December 1, 2020 (ISBN 978-4047362154)	May 17, 2022 (ISBN 978-1975338961)
2	February 28, 2022 (ISBN 978-4047369450)	January 17, 2023 (ISBN 978-1975361020
3	April 1, 2023 (ISBN 978-4047373259)	June 18, 2024 (ISBN 978-1975393960

== Reception ==
Reception to the manga was largely positive, with many reviewers commenting on the asexual representation. Anime News Network described the manga's depiction of Yuriko's struggles in a society that is often unaccepting or unaware of asexuality as being "so real it hurts[.]"

School Library Journal called the first volume "a rare comedy that presents an asexual lead with sincerity."

Briana Lawrence of The Mary Sue compared Yuriko's experiences discovering her asexuality to her own experiences realizing she was bisexual.

Paulina Przystupa of WomenWriteAboutComics commented on how the manga tackled the Boys' Love genre from the perspective of a gay man, with Gakurouta becoming invested in one of Yuriko's manga.

Sarah of Anime UK News reviewed all three volumes, giving the first volume a rating of 7 out of 10 and the two subsequent volumes rating of 8 out of 10.
