= Megaera (Hades) =

Hades character

- Hades character
- Megaera in Hades
- First appearance: Hades (2020)
- Created by: Greg Kasavin
- Designed by: Jen Zee
- Voiced by: Avalon Penrose

Megaera is a character in the 2020 video game Hades. She is the first major opponent of the protagonist, Zagreus, being tasked with preventing him from leaving the Underworld by Hades. She was created by Greg Kasavin, designed by Jen Zee, and voiced by Avalon Penrose. She is fought most times Zagreus travels through the first area of the game, Tartarus, and can be found at the House of Hades. Zagreus is able to pursue a relationship with her alone or together with the character Thanatos, with Megaera consenting to a polyamorous relationship with the three. Her polyamorous relationship, as well as her relationship with Zagreus, was the subject of commentary, with one critic suggesting that she and Zagreus have a dominant-submissive relationship respectively. She has also been well received, praised for the attractiveness of her voice.

== Concept and creation ==
Megaera is a character in Hades, based on the mythological figure of the same name in Greek mythology. Her design was created by Jen Zee. When asked why the character designs in the game were so attractive, Hades creative director Greg Kasavin attributed this to Jen Zee, the game's character artist. He stated that the designs "owe greatly to classical tradition," which Zee cared about. He added that they justified the gods being hot by virtue of them being gods. When making characters in 3D in the game, 3D artist Paige Carter used either Megaera or Thanatos, with characters like Nyx being based on Megaera's model.

Kasavin touched upon the possible polyamorous relationship between Megaera, Zagreus, and Thanatos, noting that it was something that developed over time instead of being present from the beginning. He discussed that polyamory would make sense for gods, as they did not face the same challenges as mortals, though he noted that polyamory fit the Ancient Greece setting as well.

Megaera is voiced by Avalon Penrose. Penrose read for multiple characters in Hades, but ultimately booked Megaera. When doing her voice, she starts with her normal, raspy voice before removing the singsongy and expressive parts of it before dropping it as low as she can. She then adopts a vocal fry, not speaking above a whisper. She had difficulties at times staying in Meg's voice, returning after being prompted by audio director Darren Korb to redo it with "a little more Meg." Before Megaera, she had not played a romantic interest, discussing how much she enjoyed certain qualities of Megaera, such as her "sharp, brutal beauty and commanding athleticism," commenting that fanart that depicts Megaera as powerful made her feel empowered.

== Appearances ==
Megaera is a boss that Zagreus faces on multiple occasions at the end of the first location on Zagreus' way out of the Underworld. Tasked with preventing him from leaving, she fights to the death, upon which either him or her is sent back to the House of Hades. She is one of the three Fury Sisters; one of her other two sisters, either Tisiphone or Alecto may take her place. In the House of Hades, the player may have Zagreus give her a Nectar, which improves the relationship between him and her. Eventually, Megaera may attempt to seduce Zagreus, which the player may choose to accept or turn down. If Zagreus is in a relationship with Thanatos, Megaera expresses a willingness to be involved in a polyamorous relationship.

== Reception ==
Megaera was named one of the 10 best characters of 2020 by Game Informer writer Joe Juba, feeling that Zagreus' repeated battles with Megaera creates a lasting impact, particularly thanks to her "wry and competitive personality" that improves the dialogue for Juba. Some fans of Hades have expressed their attraction for Megaera's voice, with voice actor Avalon Penrose noting that people being attracted to her voice created a cognitive dissonance, in part due to an insult about her not being fit for "pretty girl" roles. Destructoid writer Noelle Warner enjoyed her voice acting, noting that it made her swoon and calling it the standout performance of the game. She attributed her attraction to Megaera's "low, gravelly voices," adding that despite not enjoying negging, she particularly enjoyed when Megaera did it. The Gamer writer Stacey Henley was critical of the boss fight against Megaera. She described her as one of the more interesting characters, as well as one of the game's first challenges, which she felt helped lead to her boss fight being popular, but argued that it was the worst encounter in the game. She felt that the fight feels too much like a tutorial, and that her skillset lacks the diversity of other bosses, including her sisters. Kotaku writers Nathan Grayson and Ari Notis discussed Megaera and Zagreus' relationship, with Grayson enjoying how she tries to keep Zagreus at arm's length to make it easier for her to view him as an opponent she has to stop instead of a "weird sorta-friend."

The relationship between Megaera and Zagreus, as well as the potential polyamorous relationship they may have with Thanatos, was the subject of discussion by critics. The Mary Sue writer Briana Lawrence was shocked to discover that polyamory between the three was possible, enjoying watching Zagreus work out the issues he has with them over him trying to leave. Lawrence also discussed the relationship between her and Dusa, feeling that Megaera has the same platonic love for Dusa that Zagreus has for Dusa. Wired writer Gabriel Aikins also discussed the polyamory between the three, as well as the matter of kink and consent in their relationship. They argued that polyamorous relationships were a rarity in media, games or otherwise. On kink, Aikins discussed the interpretation of Megaera and Zagreus' relationship as a dominant-submissive one, with Megaera serving as the sadist and Zagreus the masochist, suggesting this correlated with the gameplay experience of Megaera and Zagreus' multiple battles with one another. Wired writer Autumn Wright Megaera's androgynous appearance represented a "subvers[ion] to classical tradition" in Ancient Greek culture, and that this androgyny would be considered demeaning to Zagreus. Comic Book Resource writer Noelle Corbett felt that the trio represented three different Ancient Greek conceptions of love, with Megaera specifically representing eros due to her forwardness and sexual passion.
