= Megara (Thessaly) =

Megara (Ancient Greek: Μέγαρα) was a town in ancient Thessaly. It is unlocated.
