= Andrew Joseph White =

American author

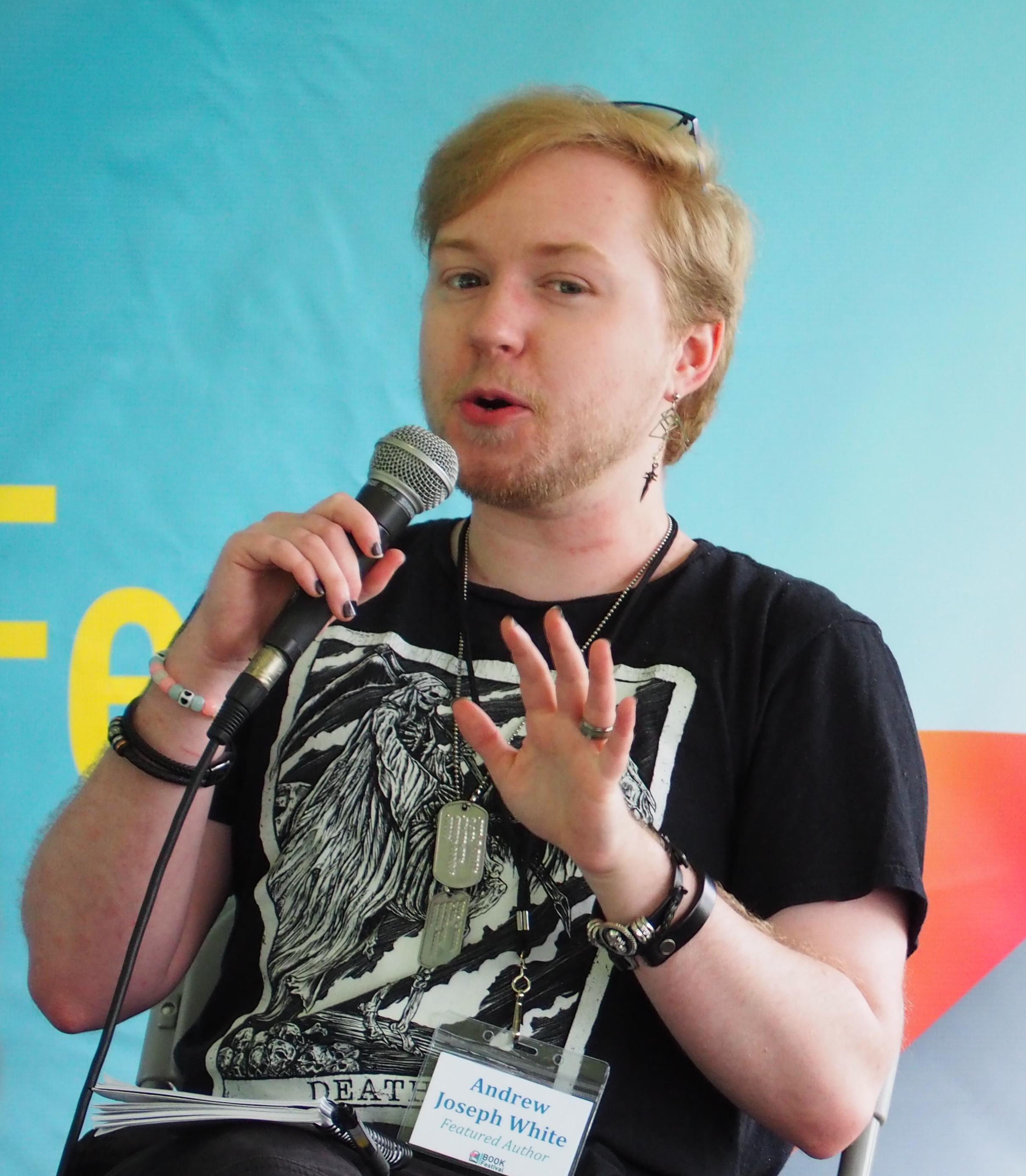
- White speaking at the 2024 Gaithersburg Book Festival
- Occupation: Writer
- Writing career
- Years active: 2018–present
- Notable work: Hell Followed with Us
- Website: andrewjosephwhite.com

Andrew Joseph White is an American young adult fiction author. He is best known for New York Times bestselling dystopian young adult novel Hell Followed with Us (2022).

== Early life and education ==
White began writing stories about queer people when he was 12 years old. He went to Handley High School in Winchester, Virginia, graduating in 2016. While in high school, he participated in the nonprofit Project Write program. White graduated from George Mason University in 2022 with an MFA in Creative Writing.

== Career ==
White's books center on LGBTQ characters and themes. Paste magazine described his writing as "filled with difficult truths, righteous fury, and complex queer characters". His desire to write about LGBTQ characters was inspired by the many anti-transgender laws being passed in state legislatures. White's work has been recommended by many other LGBTQ authors, including T.J. Klune. In a 2022 interview, he said that many transgender people feel drawn to the horror genre because of "themes like social transgression, vulnerability, and alienation". Additionally in a 2025 interview with Geeks OUT Magazine, White had stated how feels at home when writing about the trans experience through the lens of horror, sympathizing with his younger trans audience. "It's amazing how you can connect to the roughest, messiest parts of yourself and others through the lens of fiction."

White was a major contributor to the #LGBTWIP writing movement on Twitter between 2018 and 2020. He also participated in the #TransBooks365 Twitter campaign in 2021.

White's work has also been recognized in the American Library Association, with essayist Fin Leary discussing how White, among many other queer authors of trans young adult (YA) books, helped him come out.

=== Hell Followed with Us (2022) ===
White's debut young adult novel, Hell Followed with Us (2022), was published to positive reviews. It was a finalist for the Young Adult Library Services Association's 2023 William C Morris Award. Before its publication, it was featured by Lambda Literacy as one of June 2022's most highly anticipated LGBTQIA+ young adult novels. Hell Followed With Us was ranked #10 on the New York Times Young Adult Bestseller list in August 2022, and was included in The Year-To-Date 2023 Indie Bestsellers List by the American Booksellers Association. Paste Magazine listed it as one of the Best YA Books of 2022. White cited videogames Far Cry 5 and Dead Space as inspiration for the book, as well as Alexander Gordon Smith's Escape from Furnace series. Author V. E. Tirado commissioned a custom chest binder based on the novel, gaining significant attention. Trustbridge Entertainment acquired the film rights to Hell Followed with Us in 2024. The project is stated to be an anime-inspired film, and is being produced in part by Lilly Wachowski of the Matrix franchise.

=== The Spirit Bares its Teeth (2023) ===
White's sophomore novel The Spirit Bares its Teeth was published on September 5, 2023. It was listed as one of The Observer's Best New Books of 2023, with the newspaper noting, "White brilliantly spins a novel that deftly explores gender roles and queerness in a strict, laced-up society." Paste Magazine also listed it as one of their Best YA Books of 2023, marking the second time one of White's novels would make the list. The Southern Bookseller Review described The Spirit Bares Its Teeth as a necessary addition to LGBTQ and horror literature. It was featured as a 2024 Stonewall Book Award Honoree.

=== Compound Fracture (2024) ===
White's third novel Compound Fracture was published on September 3, 2024. It received the 2025 Printz Honor Book award. Publishers Weekly called it "a stunning testament to the intertwining realities of politics and queerness, as well as community focused ideologies and the impact of those ideals in the face of oppression". It also once again landed White on Paste Magazine's Best YA Books of 2024 list. It received overwhelmingly positive reviews from Kirkus, Shelf Awareness, Booklist, The Horn Book, Bulletin of the Center for Children's Books, and School Library Journal.

=== You Weren't Meant to be Human (2025) ===
White's adult debut, You Weren't Meant to be Human, was published on September 9, 2025. Publishers Weekly gave it a starred review, calling it "a brilliant, page-turning piece of trans splatterpunk body horror and an earnest, heart-rending tragedy". It was a LibraryReads Top 10 pick for September 2025.

=== Later releases ===
White has two YA novels, You're No Better and Beast//Warden, which are scheduled for release in fall 2026 and spring 2028, respectively.

== Personal life ==
White is a bisexual transgender man. He says he had his first "gender crisis" at age 16, but did not come to terms with his trans identity until several years later. He is autistic. He is married to speculative fiction author Alice Scott.

== Bibliography ==
- Hell Followed with Us (2022)
- The Spirit Bares its Teeth (2023)
- Compound Fracture (2024)
- You Weren't Meant to be Human (2025)
- You're No Better (2026)
