= Compound Fracture (novel) =

2024 novel by Andrew Joseph White

- Author: Andrew Joseph White
- Language: English
- Genre: Thriller, Horror
- Publisher: Peachtree Teen
- Publication date: September 3, 2024
- Publication place: United States
- Pages: 370
- ISBN: 9781682636121

Compound Fracture is a 2024 thriller young adult novel by Andrew Joseph White published by Peachtree Teen. Set in West Virginia in 2017, the story follows Miles Abernathy, a trans, autistic, and aromantic teen, whose family is part of an ongoing feud with the sheriff over the exploitation of the locals. He releases photographic evidence of the sheriff staging an accident that injured his father and killed others and is beaten close to death by the sheriff's son in retaliation. After recovering he becomes haunted by the spirit of Saint Abernathy, an executed relative.

== Reception ==
The book received starred reviews from Booklist, Publishers Weekly and Kirkus Reviews and was listed as one of the best Young Adult Books of 2024 by Paste Magazine. Publishers Weekly wrote that book was "a stunning testament to the intertwining realities of politics and queerness, as well as community focused ideologies and the impact of those ideals in the face of oppression."

=== Accolades ===
| Year | Award/honor | Result | Ref |
|---|---|---|---|
| 2025 | Michael L. Printz Award | Shortlisted | |
| 2025 | Dragon Award for Best Young Adult / Middle Grade Novel | Shortlisted | |
| 2026 | American Library Association Rainbow Book List - Teen Readers | Top Ten | |
