= Mağara, Gadabay =

Mağara
- Location within Azerbaijan
- Coordinates: 40°35′N 45°49′E
- Country: Azerbaijan
- Rayon: Gadabay
- Time zone: UTC+4 (AZT)
  - Summer (DST): UTC+5 (AZT)

Mağara is a village in the Gadabay Rayon of Azerbaijan.
