= MEGARA (spectrograph) =

Optical spectrograph for the Gran Telescopio Canarias

MEGARA (acronym in Spanish for Multi-Espectrógrafo en GTC de Alta Resolución para Astronomía) is a scientific instrument installed at the Gran Telescopio Canarias (GTC), designed to perform medium- to high-resolution spectroscopy in the visible spectral range. It was developed by a consortium led by the Complutense University of Madrid (UCM) in collaboration with the National Institute of Astrophysics, Optics and Electronics (INAOE) of Mexico, the Institute of Astrophysics of Andalusia (IAA-CSIC) and the Technical University of Madrid (UPM), among other technological partners.

== Technical characteristics ==
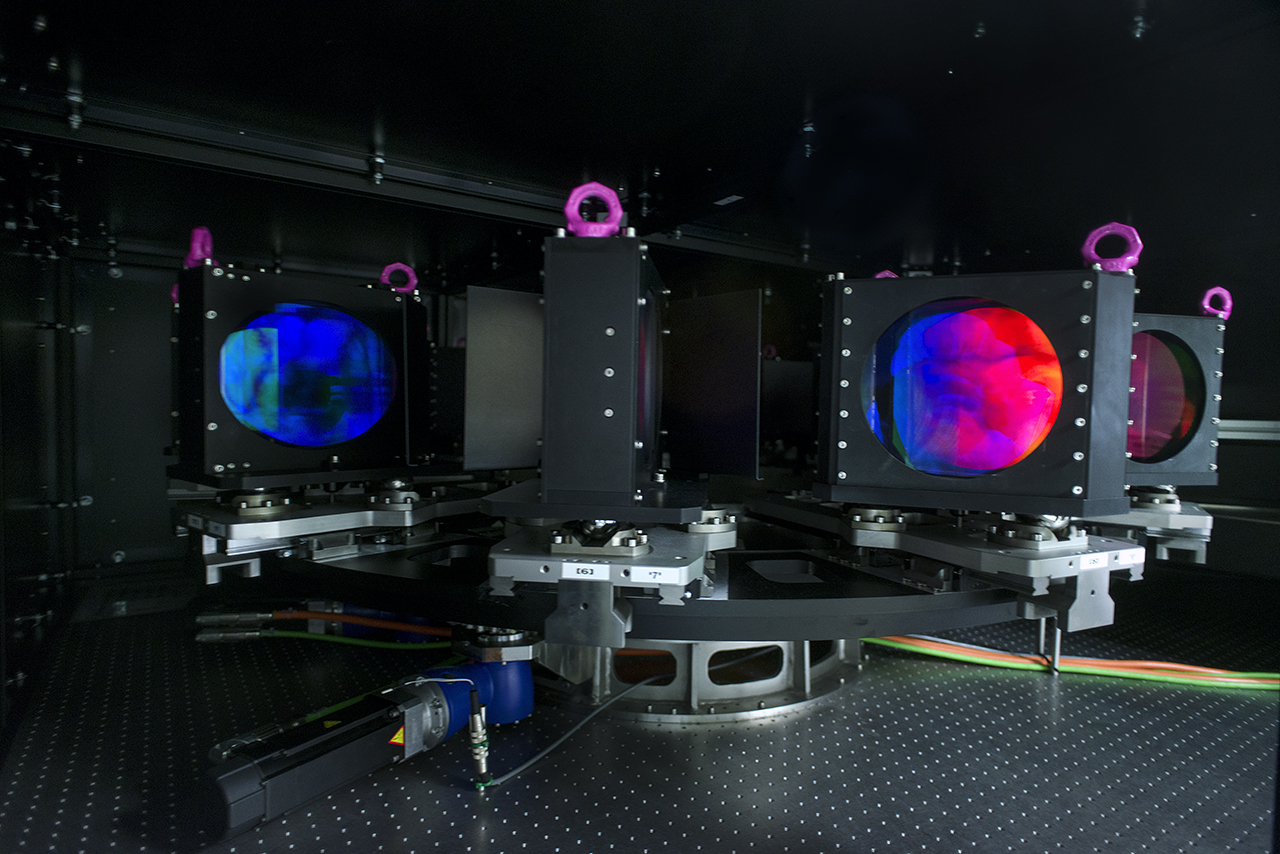
Interior view of the MEGARA instrument, showing some of its light-dispersing optical components.

MEGARA operates in two main spectroscopic observing modes: an integral field spectrograph (IFU) with a field of view of 12.5 × 11.3 arcsec², and a multi-object spectroscopy (MOS) mode that allows the simultaneous observation of up to 92 objects using independent optical fibers. The instrument covers a wavelength range from 365 to 970 nm, with spectral resolutions ranging from R ≈ 6,000 to 20,000 depending on the diffraction grating employed.

MEGARA employs volume phase holographic (VPH) diffraction gratings, which lack physical grooves and are therefore more robust and efficient than traditional ruled diffraction gratings. The instrument uses an optical fiber system fed by a microlens array to ensure high coupling efficiency and optimal light transmission.

== Development and commissioning ==
MEGARA was conceived as a second-generation instrument for the GTC. The design and construction phase took place between 2010 and 2016, with final integration and verification carried out at the Roque de los Muchachos Observatory (La Palma). The instrument achieved first light in June 2017.

The project was funded by several institutions, including the public company GRANTECAN S.A. and the consortium institutions: the Complutense University of Madrid (UCM), the National Institute of Astrophysics, Optics and Electronics (INAOE), and the Institute of Astrophysics of Andalusia (IAA-CSIC).

== Scientific production ==
Since entering operation, MEGARA has been used in a variety of astrophysical studies, including investigations of ionized gas in nearby galaxies, planetary nebulae, and especially active galactic nuclei (AGN). Its high spectral resolution makes it particularly well suited for precise kinematic studies and for the decomposition of complex spectral line profiles.

== See also ==
- Gran Telescopio Canarias
- Spectroscopy
- Diffraction grating
