= Elizabeth Kilcoyne =

American writer of young adult fiction

- Born: Kentucky, USA
- Occupation: Novelist
- Writing career
- Language: English
- Genre: Young adult fiction
- Notable work: Wake the Bones
- Website: elizabethkilcoyne.com

Elizabeth Kilcoyne is an American William C Morris Award winning author of young adult fiction, playwright, and poet, best known for her debut novel Wake the Bones.

== Personal life ==
She was born and raised in Kentucky.

Kilcoyne says she has always been drawn to speculative stories, even though a lot of her work is grounded in reality. She was a 21-year-old college graduate when she wrote the first draft of her debut novel.

She has also been published in several literary journals. Kilcoyne currently lives in Lexington, Kentucky.

== Wake the Bones ==
In Kilcoyne's debut, young adult Southern Gothic Wake the Bones, a teen returns home after dropping out of college and starts experiencing strange things in her hometown that she suspects are tied to her late mother's ghost. Kilcoyne says she was inspired to write the novel while on a walk through the woods. It was published by Wednesday Books in 2022 and a finalist for the William C. Morris Award. It received a starred review from Kirkus Reviews and Publishers Weekly.
