= Genesis Begins Again =

2019 children's novel by Alicia D. Williams

- First edition
- Author: Alicia D. Williams
- Language: English
- Publisher: Atheneum
- Publication date: January 15, 2019
- Publication place: United States
- Pages: 400
- Awards: Newbery Honor
- ISBN: 978-1-4814-6580-9

Genesis Begins Again is a 2019 children's book by Alicia D. Williams. It tells the story of thirteen-year-old Genesis Anderson, whose family has been evicted several times from their home due to the father's gambling addiction. Genesis is also a victim of bullying and colorism, both at home and school, two recurring themes of the novel. Genesis Begins Again, Williams's debut novel, received general praise and won a Newbery Honor and "Steptoe Award for New Talent".

== Plot ==
Genesis Anderson is a thirteen-year-old girl that lives in Detroit. Her father is alcoholic who also suffers of gambling addiction. While the two of them have dark skin color, Genesis's mother has a lighter skin. Genesis is constantly bullied by her schoolmates due the color of her skin, and she also blames herself for the troubles at home, to the point she keeps a list of all the things she thinks is wrong about her.

One day, Genesis manages to spend some time with some of the more popular girls of her school, and decides to invite them to her house. When they get there, the furniture had been thrown outside; her family had once again been evicted from their home due to her father not paying the rent. Genesis and her mother go stay with her grandmother and she begins attending a new school. While at home her grandmother repeats colorist ideologies, such as the use of the "paper bag test" to know if someone has a light enough skin to pass as not black, at school Genesis is no longer bullied, she meets Troy, the love interest, and joins the chorus after finding out she has a talent for singing.

Genesis is encouraged to participate in the school's talent show, which her father goes to watch. Despite being drunk, he tells Genesis the reason why he became an alcoholic, and tells her he has been going to Alcoholics Anonymous.

== Major themes ==
One of the main themes in the novel is colorism and the consequences it can lead to the life of a young person. Genesis, the main character, is constantly bullied by her classmates, who call her names due to her darker skin color. Her father, also dark skinned, is an alcoholic with a gambling addiction responsible for their family being evicted several times throughout her life. He is also verbally abusive towards her when drunk, and dislikes her resemblance to himself.

Genesis's family on her mother's side, who are light skinned, believe in colorist ideologies, to the point they use the "paper bag test" to see if someone's skin is "light enough", which Genesis's is not. Surrounded by a family struggling with housing and substance abuse, the main character ends up believing the only way to make things better is by straightening her hair and lightening her skin, which she does through excoriation.

== Development ==
Alicia D. Williams first began writing Genesis Begins Again in 2012, when she was studying for her master's degree at Hamline University. This shorter version, which was about 80 pages long, was used as her graduate thesis for her master's in creative writing for children and young adults. The story began as autobiographical, with many of the experiences that Genesis goes through being based on Williams's own childhood. After receiving advices from colleagues, Williams decided to separate herself from the main character so the book could better reflect the present instead of the past.

In 2014, one year after graduating, Williams finished writing the manuscript for her book, which by then was around a hundred pages long. On that same year, writer Anne Ursu, whom she had met before during workshops, asked to read her work. On November, Williams sent a revised manuscript to Ursu, who loved what she saw, and advised her to send it to publishing agents.

She closed a publishing deal in 2015, with an expected release for spring of 2017. She began working on the second draft in February 2016. Williams kept writing the book while working as a teacher assistant at kindergartens, and said in an interview to the NPR she was inspired by the children she met there. Many of them would choose colors that were much lighter than their skin tone when drawing themselves. While waiting for the draft to come back, Williams wrote two other texts, both biographies. When her draft was returned six months later, she was advised by her editor to improve the several threads that were developed throughout the book's chapters, which she did by reading other books her editor published, as well as award-winning authors.

== Reception ==
Williams's debut novel received wide praise by critics. Kirkus Reviews called its prose "smooth and engrossing", and said it was a familiar story that needed to be told. Writing for the Horn Book Magazine, Monique Harris commented on how the author manages to tell a story about living with colorism and the consequences of addiction. The Washington Informer called the novel "perfect" for a middle-schooler, praising it for how it deals with topics that might be uncomfortable for some without using much profanity or "unnecessary drama".

Writing for The New York Times, Katherine Marsh called Genesis Begins Again a "stunning debut novel", as well as "tender and empowering". She praised it for the complex relationship that is created between each family member of Genesis's family. Marsh also admired how the story "explores racism within the black community", and called Genesis's self-discovery and development "reminiscent of Toni Morrison's 'The Bluest Eye'", but for a younger audience.

Deborah Stevenson praised the book for its "hard-hitting frankness" about the effects colorism has on the main character, and called Genesis's finally "finding her own voice" the most compelling part of the novel. Stevenson criticized the sections of the story about Genesis' parents, saying "[her father's] concluding turnaround is more device than believable development". She made a similar negative comment about how believable it is that the main character suddenly becomes a "gifted vocalist".

== Awards and nominations ==
Genesis Begins Again was a "Kirkus Prize" finalist and received a Newbery Honor in 2020. Williams also received the Author's John Steptoe Award for New Talent, which serves to highlight new African-American writers and illustrators of children's books.

The book was in Kirkus Reviews's list of "Best Books of 2019" and in the 2020 Association for Library Service to Children list of "Notable Children's Books".
