= Echo Brown =

American author (1984–2023)

Echo Unique Ladadrian Brown (April 10, 1984 – September 16, 2023) was an American writer whose work is known for addressing race, class, and identity. Her debut novel, Black Girl Unlimited: The Remarkable Story of a Teenage Wizard (2020), is a semi-autobiographical work that blends magical realism with her experiences growing up in Cleveland.

== Biography ==
Brown was born in Cleveland on April 10, 1984, where she was raised by her seamstress mother and welder stepfather. Her early life was marked by the challenges of growing up in poverty. During her senior year at John Jay High School, she lived temporarily with an English teacher who recognized her academic potential. Despite this, a guidance counselor discouraged her aspirations for Dartmouth College, citing her background. Undeterred, Brown, who was class valedictorian, attended Dartmouth, wrote for the student newspaper, and earned a bachelor's degree in political science in 2006. She became the first person in her family to graduate college, an experience that was a major theme in her writing. While at Dartmouth, Brown was called a "nigger," an experience she would go on to say would "shatter" her.

After graduation, Brown worked in New York City's Civilian Complaint Review Board, investigating police misconduct and later served as a legal secretary. She briefly enrolled at Columbia Journalism School but subsequently faced a period of depression. She then moved to the San Francisco Bay Area, started engaging in yoga and meditation, and began working at Challenge Day, a nonprofit organization focused on anti-bullying and violence prevention.

== Writing and performing ==
=== "Black Virgins Are Not For Hipsters" (2015–2017) ===
Brown discovered that she had a knack for storytelling while working for Challenge Day. Under the guidance of David Ford at The Marsh theater in San Francisco, Brown developed her one-woman show, "Black Virgins Are Not for Hipsters," which debuted in Oakland in 2015. The performance addressed various societal and personal challenges, including an incident of racial aggression she faced at Dartmouth. Brown performed across the country and author Alice Walker described Brown as "stunning and powerful," comparing her to Whoopi Goldberg and Anna Deveare Smith.

=== Writing (2018–2022) ===
After reading Brown's profile in the Dartmouth Alumni Magazine, Jessica Anderson, an editor at Christy Ottaviano Books at Henry Holt Books for Young Readers, contacted Brown and encouraged her to write a memoir. Brown authored two young-adult novels: Black Girl Unlimited: The Remarkable Story of a Teenage Wizard (2020) and The Chosen One: A First-Generation Ivy League Odyssey (2022), which drew upon her experiences at Dartmouth College navigating as a first-generation college student and includes elements of magical realism. Brown became ill in 2020 and was writing a third book, A Jazzman's Blues, in collaboration with Tyler Perry at the time of her death.

== Personal life ==
Brown gave a TEDx talk in 2017.

She died in Cleveland on September 16, 2023, due to end-stage renal failure caused by lupus. She was 39 years old.

== Bibliography ==
- Black Girl Unlimited: The Remarkable Story of a Teenage Wizard (2020)
- The Chosen One: A First-Generation Ivy League Odyssey (2022)
- A Jazzman's Blues (2026)
