= 464 Megaira =

Main-belt asteroid

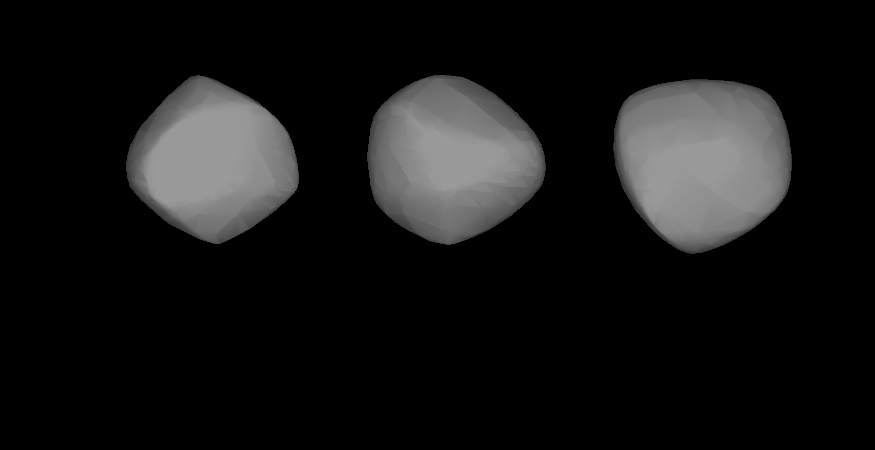
- Lightcurve-base 3D-model of 464 Megaira.

Discovery
- Discovered by: M. F. Wolf
- Discovery site: Heidelberg Obs.
- Discovery date: 9 January 1901

Designations
- Pronunciation: /mɪˈɡaɪərə/ (Megaira) /mɪˈdʒɪərə/ (Megaera)
- Named after: Megaera (Greek mythology)
- Alternative designations: A901 AB · 1929 AH; A912 JB · A912 JC; A916 FD · 1901 FV
- Minor planet category: main-belt · (middle); background

Orbital characteristics
- Epoch 31 May 2020 (JD 2459000.5)
- Uncertainty parameter 0
- Observation arc: 119.07 yr (43,489 d)
- Aphelion: 3.3764 AU
- Perihelion: 2.2248 AU
- Semi-major axis: 2.8006 AU
- Eccentricity: 0.2056
- Orbital period (sidereal): 4.69 yr (1,712 d)
- Mean anomaly: 253.43°
- Mean motion: 0° 12^{m} 37.08^{s} / day
- Inclination: 10.170°
- Longitude of ascending node: 102.37°
- Argument of perihelion: 258.19°

Physical characteristics
- Mean diameter: 75 ± 1 km (pole solution 1); 79 ± 1 km (pole solution 2)
- Mass: (6.0±6.0)×10^{17} kg (Note: Calculated from its standard gravitational parameter GM = 0.04±0.04 km^{3}/s^{2}.) (SB441)
- Mean density: 2.7±2.7 g/cm^{3} (pole solution 1); 2.3±2.3 g/cm^{3} (pole solution 2)
- Synodic rotation period: 12.878573±0.000001 h
- Pole ecliptic longitude: 45° ± 3° or 234° ± 4°
- Pole ecliptic latitude: 13° ± 5° or 34° ± 14°
- Geometric albedo: 0.045±0.002; 0.046±0.011; 0.0502±0.009
- Spectral type: Tholen = FXU: SMASS = C; B–V = 0.638±0.063
- Absolute magnitude (H): 9.7

464 Megaira (prov. designation: A901 AB or 1901 FV) is a dark and large background asteroid, approximately 77 kilometers (48 miles) in diameter, located in the central region of the asteroid belt. It was discovered by astronomer Max Wolf at the Heidelberg Observatory in southwest Germany on 9 January 1901. The carbonaceous C-type asteroid (FX) has a rotation period of 12.9 hours. It was named after Megaera from Greek mythology.

== Orbit and classification ==
Megaira is a non-family asteroid of the main belt's background population when applying the hierarchical clustering method to its proper orbital elements. It orbits the Sun in the central asteroid belt at a distance of 2.2–3.4 AU once every 4 years and 8 months (1,712 days; semi-major axis of 2.8 AU). Its orbit has an eccentricity of 0.21 and an inclination of 10° with respect to the ecliptic. The body's observation arc begins at Heidelberg Observatory with its official discovery observation on 9 January 1901.

== Naming ==
This minor planet was named after Megaera, the avenging spirit from Greek mythology. She is one of the three Erinyes (Furies), who bring retribution on those guilty of sins. The naming was also mentioned in The Names of the Minor Planets by Paul Herget in 1955 (H 50). It was the first numbered minor planet detected in the 20th century.

== Physical characteristics ==
In the Tholen classification-SMASS classification, Megaira is closest to a dark F-type asteroid, and somewhat similar to an X-type, though with an unusual (U) and noisy spectra (:). In the Bus–Binzel SMASS classification it is a common carbonaceous C-type asteroid.

=== Rotation period ===
In March 2019, a rotational lightcurve of Megaira was obtained from photometric observations by Frederick Pilcher. Lightcurve analysis gave a well-defined rotation period of 12.879±0.001 hours with a brightness variation of 0.12±0.01 magnitude (U=3). The result supersedes previously published period determinations.

=== Diameter and albedo ===
According to the surveys carried out by the Infrared Astronomical Satellite IRAS, the Japanese Akari satellite and the NEOWISE mission of NASA's Wide-field Infrared Survey Explorer, Megaira measures between 55.09 and 85.50 kilometers in diameter and its surface has an albedo between 0.03 and 0.06. The Collaborative Asteroid Lightcurve Link takes an albedo of 0.0469 from Petr Pravec's revised WISE data and calculates a diameter of 78.29 kilometers based on an absolute magnitude of 9.47.
