= Lish McBride =

American novelist

Lish McBride is an American writer of urban fantasy. Her first book was Hold Me Closer, Necromancer, a young-adult novel about a fast-food fry cook who learns he is a necromancer. It won a 2011 Washington State Book Award and was a finalist for the William C. Morris YA Debut Award. Her second novel, Necromancing the Stone, was released in September 2012.

McBride grew up outside Seattle. She moved to Seattle when she was 21, then to University of New Orleans for her MFA in fiction. After completing her degree, she returned to Seattle, where she lived as of late 2010.

== Bibliography ==
=== Necromancer Series ===
- Hold Me Closer, Necromancer (October 2010, ISBN 9780805090987)
- Necromancing the Stone (September 2012, ISBN 9780805090994)
- "Halfway Through the Wood" (short story) and You Make Me Feel So Young" (short story) in Freaks & Other Family (Dec 21, 2016 ISBN 0998403202)
- "We Should Get Jerseys 'Cause We Make a Good Team" (short story) in the anthology Cornered: 14 Stories of Bullying and Defiance (ISBN 0762444282)
- "Death & Waffles" (short story) in Burniac, Lauren, ed. (12 May 2015). Fierce Reads: Kisses and Curses. Square Fish (published 2015). ISBN 9781250060532.
- "Heads Will Roll" (short story)

=== Firebug series ===
- Firebug (September 2014, ISBN 9780805098624)
- Pyromantic (March 2017, ISBN 9780805098631), sequel to Firebug
- "Burnt Sugar" (short story) in released on Tor.com

== Other ==
- "School of Fish (short story) in What to Read in the Rain anthology
- "Just the Mustache" published in The Normal School: A Literary Magazine
