= Escape from Furnace =

Books series by Alexander Gordon Smith

- Front cover of Escape from Furnace: Lockdown, Book 1 of the series
- Author: Alexander Gordon Smith
- Language: English
- Genre: adult fiction, Science fiction
- Published: August 2010-November 2015
- Media type: Print (hardcover, paperback), novella
- No. of books: 5, plus one novella
- Followed by: Solitary; Death Sentence; Fugitives; Execution; The Night Children

Escape from Furnace is a series of five novels by British author Alexander Gordon Smith. The books follow teenage protagonist Alex Sawyer and describe his incarceration in the fictional London prison Furnace Penitentiary. Escape from Furnace: Lockdown is followed by Solitary, Death Sentence, Fugitives and Execution. Smith followed up the series with a novella, The Night Children, which tells the story of the 17-year-old commissioned officer Kreuz (known as Warden Cross in the series) and his meeting with Alfred Furnace, the prison's founder, and his creatures in the Belgian woods during World War II. Escape from Furnace is the United States title of the series, as in the United Kingdom the series is known as just "Furnace".

== Plot overview ==
=== Lockdown ===
Furnace Penitentiary, in the distant future, is the world’s most secure prison for young offenders. It is buried a mile beneath the Earth’s surface. One way in and no way out. Once you're here, you're here until you die, and for most of the inmates that doesn't take long - not with the sadistic guards and the bloodthirsty gangs. Convicted of a murder he didn't commit, sentenced to life without parole, ‘new fish’ Alex Sawyer knows he has two choices: find a way out, or resign himself to a death behind bars, in the darkness at the bottom of the world.

Only in Furnace, death is the least of his worries. Soon Alex discovers that the prison is a place of pure evil: where creatures in gas masks stalk the corridors at night, where giants in black suits drag screaming inmates into the shadows, where deformed beasts can be heard howling from the blood drenched tunnels below waiting to kill. And behind everything is the mysterious, all-powerful warden, a man as cruel and as dangerous as the devil himself, whose unthinkable acts have consequences that stretch far beyond the walls of the prison.

Together with a bunch of inmates - some innocent kids who have been framed, others cold-blooded killers - Alex plans the prison break to end all prison breaks. But as he starts to uncover the truth about Furnace’s deeper, darker purpose, Alex's actions grow ever more dangerous, and he must risk everything to expose this nightmare that's hidden from the eyes of the world...

=== Solitary ===
Alex, Zee and Gary are on the loose in Furnace tunnels and caves but are eventually found by the warden, the blacksuits and their hounds. Alex and Zee are condemned to a month in the 'hole', the solitary confinement, while a wounded Gary is taken to the infirmary. In the pitch black hole, where all the worst nightmares come true, Alex and Zee manage to stay sane by communicating to each other by banging on the steel pipes and the frequent visits of Simon - he yanks them out of their cells and works with them and his friends in order to make an escape attempt: first through a steeple, later through the incinerator. In the prison's underground mazes Alex and Zee discover the dark truth: the inmates are lab rats; the wheezers perform procedures on them in order to become blacksuits but these experiments sometimes fail so they're either turned into 'rats' which seek only for food and revenge or 'mutants', half rats half boys, who are harmless because they remember their old lives. In the infirmary Alex finds Gary and Donovan (who is later smothered by a pillow) who are turned into blacksuits. Alex's second escape plan doesn't go smoothly either: Zee is taken to the infirmary but is later saved by Simon and Alex, the steeple doesn't lead to the outside but to one of the rats' lair and on their way through the incinerator Alex, Zee and Simon are caught by the blacksuits.

=== Death Sentence ===
Alex undergoes the blacksuit procedure, while Simon, Zee and Ozzie are locked up. With the 'nectar', a dark liquid full of tiny golden flecks, in his veins, Alex starts to forget things - his life prior and in Furnace, his friends and even his name - and what's left is a cruel, merciless hatred toward the weak and a lust for power. But to become a real blacksuit, he has to pass a test, in which he successfully kills many rats and Ozzie. As a new recruit, he finds out other secrets: the existence of the 'berserkers' (creatures that are bigger, stronger, more merciless and with no rational thoughts as the blacksuits), and the nectar - the essence of it (the darkness that lies in someone's fear of death) and the motives behind it (to create perfect soldiers without fear, pain nor pity). When he has to pass another test by killing Zee, Alex starts to remember his name so he attempts to escape for the third time along with Zee and Simon, this time through the elevator that connects the prison with the main gate. After a while, he starts to feel weak due to the lack of the nectar; without it he can either become a boy again or completely lose his mind and become a merciless killer, worse than a berserker, but Simon takes care of it. In the prison's 'gen pop' they and the other prisoners successfully defeat their enemies sent - first the blacksuits, later two berserkers - and reach the main gate. They are finally free. Hearing the police sirens, Alex, Simon and Zee run for it while in Alex's mind there's Furnace's voice screaming I am coming for you.

=== Fugitives ===
The inmates are on the run with the police and the SWAT on their heels, but are also chased by Furnace nightmarish creatures that carry the 'red-flecked' nectar - it has evolved into a plague, so the infected creatures or humans spread it by attacking and/or killing others. Trying to get as far away from the prison as possible, Alex, Zee and Simon hide first in a mall, later in the metro where they meet Lucy. After encountering some infected, Alex is bitten by a red-flecked berserker that causes him to teeter on the brink of insanity thanks also to Alfred Furnace's voice and visions - he wants Alex to be his right-hand man in the new 'Fatherland'. Soon they realize that the city is in a state of chaos and destruction, a war between Furnace's infected and humanity. After an attack of the infected in St Martin's Cathedral that Alex, Zee, Simon and Lucy survive, they are brought by Annabel and another soldier to a supposed safe place of PMCs, later revealed as the blacksuits. During their short capture, Alex, Zee, Simon and Lucy discover another inconvenient truth: the red-flecked nectar has been created by Alfred Furnace and is more powerful than the warden's nectar, and the Furnace Penitentiary is not the only place where blacksuits are created. They decide to destroy Furnace's tower with Furnace and his creatures in it. When Alex comes to meet Furnace, he finds instead Warden Cross who fills himself with the red-flecked nectar. He fights Alex but is eventually defeated. Drinking from Cross' blood, Alex becomes a berserker. On the tower's roof while the building is being bombarded, Alex promises to find and kill Furnace.

=== Execution ===
Alex is brought by the army, along with Zee, Simon and Lucy, to St Margaret's hospital where he, Simon and other Furnace creatures are studied by Panettiere and others while the plague's spreading through and out of the country. During the experiments, Alex drifts in and out of sleep where he experiences Furnace's memories. With Zee's visit, Alex realizes that he's expendable - he doesn't have any information about the nectar reproduction/annihilation or the whereabouts of the culprit. So Panettiere kills him but is resurrected by Sam. After Cross' death, Alex's considered Furnace's right-hand man, therefore, Sam and some berserkers help him and his friends to escape. With Panettiere and her army on their heels (they want to study Zee's immunity to the nectar), they spend the night in Alex's house, where he finds out that his parents haven't abandoned him as he remembers but have been trying to get him out of prison, and then they finally reach the island where Furnace is. At last, Alex meets Furnace who's still alive by being attached to a machine and wants Alex to be his heir - Alex is the only one who could handle the nectar and remember his history, and that's what the Stranger needs to survive. He accepts Furnace's offer, in doing so Alex's nectar is replaced by the Stranger's blood in Furnace's veins. Furnace is turned to dust and the Stranger manipulates Alex in continuing the war. However, with his friends' support Alex ends it by killing all of Furnace's creatures, including Simon, through telepathic images of freedom and peace. When Panettiere finally reaches them, she receives all of Alex's blood and dies while Alex's saved by receiving a nectar transfusion. Alex, Zee and Lucy are then brought to a military base where he's interrogated about what's happened. As time passes, the three of them and the whole world are trying to live a better, normal life, and Alex goes under the knife in order to become human again.

== Main characters ==
Alex Sawyer - The main protagonist, 14 years old. Despite his young age, he makes several bad choices that lead him to imprisonment: he becomes a bully with two other kids, a thief and a liar. After a burglary, he is framed for the murder of his best friend and is sent to Furnace with no possibility of parole. With a bunch of inmates he tries to escape twice, but fails. After the second attempt he is turned into a blacksuit, and during a test to prove himself as a black suit, he kills Ozzie. However, he remembers his name and he successfully makes the third escape along with all of the prisoners of Furnace. He is on the brink of insanity due to the nectar running through his veins, but with his friends' help he manages to stay true to himself. After the escape he's infected with a new type of nectar, defeats Warden Cross and is turned into a berserker. After escaping the army who wants the nectar for themselves, he kills Furnace by becoming his heir and receiving the stranger's blood in Furnace's veins. Taking control of the war, he manages to end it by killing all of Furnace's creatures with his friends' help. He then escapes Furnace.

Zee Hatcher - One of Alex's closest friends, sent to Furnace at the same time as Alex. He is framed for driving into an older woman and prior to Furnace, he used to steal cars. He's immune to the nectar: to the warden in Death Sentence he's of no use (he is unable to be turned into a blacksuit), while the army in Execution is very interested in him (he could hold the key to the cure).

Carl Donovan - Alex's cellmate, 16 years old, one of the first to be brought to Furnace. At 11 years old he murders his mother's lover with a candlestick - he couldn't bear his mother's beatings. In Lockdown he acts as a guardian angel for Alex, although he is loath to admit it, and takes part in the escape plan until he is taken away in the blood watch. In Solitary he is turned into a blacksuit and is killed by Alex. Throughout the whole series, Alex still thinks of him and has imaginary talks with him.

Simon Rojo-Flores - A failed mutant who assists Alex and Zee with and after their escape plan from the hole. He is sent to Furnace because he accidentally murders the owner of a jewelry store during a robbery. He dies at the end of Execution.

Lucy Wells - A girl who tags along with Alex, Zee, and Simon after they meet in Fugitives. Her father was a policeman who was killed during the Summer of Slaughter, therefore, she hates them at first.

Warden Cross - One of the main antagonists whose eyes are so full of madness, hatred and rancid glee that meeting them is like watching yourself die a million times over. He is over 100 years old, and was 'adopted' by Furnace during WWII. Since then, he has regularly taken the nectar. In Furnace Penitentiary, he has control over the wheezers, blacksuits, prisoners and other creatures. He takes orders only from Alfred Furnace, often referring to himself as Furnace's 'right-hand man'. Due to Alex's rebellion against him, Furnace attempts to use Alex as Cross's replacement. Warden Cross is eventually drained of his own blood by Alex and fed to the wheezers in Fugitives.

Alfred Furnace - He is the founder of the Furnace Penitentiary and the main antagonist in the series. He communicates telepathically with Alex and the other creatures through the nectar but he appears only in Execution. Having been born in Hungary in the 18th century - thereby making him over 300 years old as of the events of the story - and has experienced this enhanced lifespan due to his usage of the Stranger's blood, the base product of the nectar. When he was a boy, he was framed for murdering his younger brother József - the real killer was the Stranger - and was crucified by the townspeople; instead of death he choose the Stranger's offer, receiving immortality through the Stranger's blood. For centuries, he traveled across Europe, creating soldiers with his nectar in order to make a world in which there is only strength and equality. However, Furnace isn't in control of his actions but is controlled by the Stranger. In Execution he finally dies and is replaced by Alex.

== Side characters ==
Sam The Blacksuit - A blacksuit who turns out to be assisting Alex while he is in the base in "Fugitives."

General Hamilton - A general in Execution who gives Alex, Zee and Lucy a lift from the island to a military base.

Monty - An inmate that shows up the same time as Alex. At first he is aloof and shows no warmness to Alex even after he saves his life during a skirmish in the trough room but at the end repays the kindness by making him, Donovan and Zee a legitimate meal using leftovers in the kitchen. He is taken by the blood watch and turned into a blacksuit - he murders Kevin. At the end of Lockdown, he saves Alex from Moleface and dies. Seconds before his death however, he tells Alex, "Never forget your name", and this would save Alex from turning into a complete monster many times later in the series. Alex and Monty seem to be the only characters in the series who remembered their names after being turned by the nectar (excluding Warden Cross).

Toby Merchant - A boy who arrives at Furnace shortly after Alex and is framed for murder as well. In Lockdown he attempts to commit suicide along with Ashley but is saved by Alex. He helps Alex, Donovan and Zee with the escape plan, but during the escape he is badly wounded by the explosion. In Lockdown he dies during the attempted escape.

Moleface - A blacksuit with a small mole on the chin. He is the one who frames Alex for murdering his best friend.

Skulls - One of the many gangs in Furnace, particularly cruel to "new fish". Gary became their leader in "Lockdown".

Fifty-Niners - One of the gangs responsible for the Summer of Slaughter and one of the first to come to Furnace

Rats - Furnace inmates who undergo the procedure to become blacksuits; experiment fails. They completely lose their mind due to the pain caused by the procedure and are always in search for food, including human's flesh, and revenge against the blacksuits and the warden.

Jimmy - He is framed for murder at the same time as Alex, Zee and Monty. In Lockdown he wants to escape with Alex, Zee, Toby, and Gary but fails and rats them out. His fate is unconfirmed - probably dead.

Ashley - A boy who upon arriving at Furnace, commits suicide.

Carlton Jones - Zee's cellmate in Lockdown. His fate is unconfirmed - probably dead.

Brandon - One of Alex's friends prior to Furnace. His fate is unconfirmed - probably dead.

Toby - Prior to Furnace, Toby was Alex's best friend and partner-in-crime who loved Elvis Presley. During a burglary, Toby is shot and killed by Moleface.
