= Megaera =

One of the Erinyes or Furies in Ancient Greek mythology

- Goddess of jealousy and envy
- Member of The Erinyes
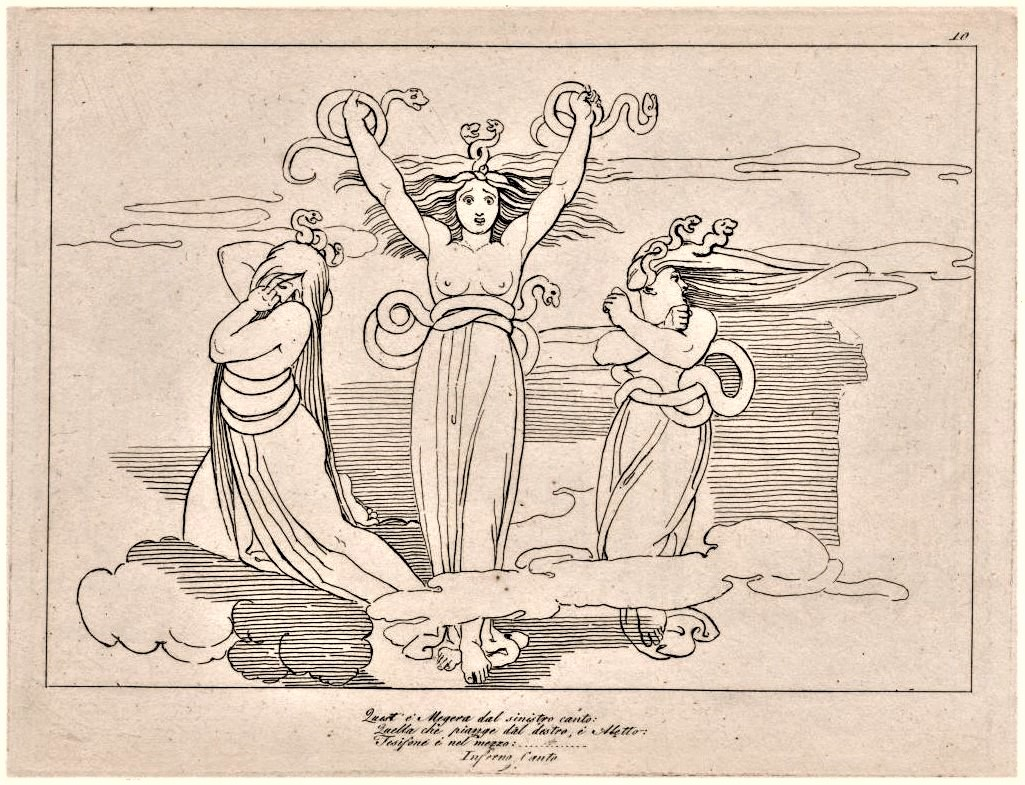
- "Questa e megera dal sinistro canto", front the Divine Comedy, 1793 printing

Genealogy
- Siblings: Alecto and Tisiphone

Megaera (/məˈdʒɪərə/ mə-JEER-ə; Ancient Greek: Μέγαιρα, romanized: Mégaira, lit. 'the jealous one') is one of the Erinyes, Eumenides or "Furies" in classical mythology. Bibliotheca Classica states "According to the most received opinions, they were three in number, Tisiphone, "Megaera ... daughter of Nyx and Acheron", and Alecto".

In other versions, she and her sisters, as well as the Meliae, were born of the blood of Uranus when Cronus castrated him.

In modern French (mégère), Portuguese (megera), Modern Greek (μέγαιρα), Italian (megera), Polish (megiera), Russian (мегера), Ukrainian (меґера), Czech (megera) and Swedish (megära), this name denotes a jealous or spiteful woman. She is not to be confused with Megara, the wife of Heracles.

== Namesakes ==
Minor planet 464 Megaira is named in her honour.

== See also ==
- Family tree of the Greek gods
- Shrew (archetype)
