= 2020 in video games =

In the video game industry, 2020 saw the launch of the next generation of video game consoles, with both Microsoft and Sony Interactive Entertainment releasing the Xbox Series X/S and PlayStation 5 consoles, respectively, in November 2020. The industry was heavily affected by the impact of the COVID-19 pandemic which had begun in March and was characterized by COVID-19 lockdowns and remote work. While this caused numerous delays in software and hardware releases and the cancellation of live conferences and events in favour of virtual shows, it also created a boom for the industry as people turned to gaming as a means to pass the time. The industry also reacted to various political/cultural events.

Mobile gaming continued its growth as a major platform for video gaming; as part of this, Epic Games initiated the Epic Games v. Apple lawsuit over mobile app store revenue cut policies. Major planned acquisitions included Xbox Game Studios' acquisition of ZeniMax Media and its subsidiaries, and Electronic Arts outbidding Take-Two Interactive for Codemasters.

Series which received new instalments included Animal Crossing, Assassin's Creed, Bloodstained, Bomberman, Call of Duty, Cook, Serve, Delicious!, Cookie Run, Crash Bandicoot, Danganronpa, Deadly Premonition, Dirt, Doom, Dragon Ball, Dragon Quest, Final Fantasy, Granblue Fantasy, Half-Life, Kingdom Hearts, Kirby, The Last of Us, The Legend of Zelda, Mafia, Mana, Medal of Honor, Megami Tensei, Microsoft Flight Simulator, Minecraft, MLB: The Show, Mystery Dungeon, Nioh, Oddworld, One Piece, Ori, Paper Mario, Persona, Project CARS, Resident Evil, Rune Factory, Serious Sam, Shantae, Spelunky, Spider-Man, Star Wars, Streets of Rage, Super Mario, Tom Clancy's Rainbow Six, Tony Hawk's Pro Skater, Total War, Trails, Vampire: The Masquerade, Wasteland, Watch Dogs, Windjammers, Yakuza, Command and Conquer, and Zombie Army.

== Financial performance ==
The global market for video games based on 2020 revenues was estimated to exceed $179.7 billion according to the International Data Corporation; the growth of 20% over 2019 revenues is attributes to the surge in spending in video games from the COVID-19 pandemic along with the releases of the new consoles.

SuperData Research estimated the global video game market grew by 12% in 2020 to a total $139.9 billion in revenues. Mobile games accounted for over $73.8 billion or 58% of the market, with computer games at $33.1 billion and console games at $19.7 billion. Virtual and augmented reality had about $6.7 billion, while video gaming content such as online streamers generated an additional $9.3 billion.

Newzoo estimated the global market for video games in 2020 was $177.8 billion, a 23.1% increase from 2019, buoyed by the COVID-19 pandemic. As a result, Newzoo anticipated that the 2021 market will see a small decline as the world recovers from COVID-19 and spending on video games slows down, but otherwise the industry would remain on track to break $200 billion in revenue by 2023.

According to PricewaterhouseCoopers, while the overall global entertainment and media market dropped by 3.8% during 2020, the video game market grew by 10% over the year, due to the use of video games to help with social distancing during COVID-19 lockdowns.

=== Largest markets ===
According to market research firm Newzoo, the following countries were the largest video game markets in 2020.

Rank	Country	Revenue
1	China	$45,642,000,000
2	United States	$39,065,000,000
3	Japan	$20,763,000,000
4	South Korea	$7,530,000,000
5	Germany	$5,702,000,000
6	United Kingdom	$5,117,000,000
7	France	$4,024,000,000
8	Canada	$3,551,000,000
9	Italy	$3,205,000,000
10	Brazil	$2,288,000,000

=== Highest-grossing games ===
The following are the top ten highest-grossing video games of 2020. Each of the top ten titles grossed more than $1 billion, while the top four grossed more than $2 billion each. The majority of the top ten titles are published by Asian companies, including three from Chinese conglomerate Tencent which holds the top two spots.

Rank	Game	Revenue	Publisher(s)	Genre(s)	Business model	Ref.
1	PlayerUnknown's Battlegrounds (PUBG)	$2,824,000,000	Tencent / Bluehole	Battle royale	Free-to-play / buy-to-play	(Note: PlayerUnknown's Battlegrounds (PUBG): PUBG Mobile (Game for Peace / Peacekeeper Elite) – $2.7 billion (free-to-play); PC (buy-to-play) – $124 million (February & May))
2	Honor of Kings / Arena of Valor	$2,564,000,000	Tencent	MOBA	Free-to-play	(Note: Honor of Kings / Arena of Valor: January to December 14 – $2.5 billion; December 25–31 (China) – $64 million)
3	Roblox	$2,290,000,000	Roblox Corporation	GCS, MMO	Free-to-play	
4	Garena Free Fire	$2,130,000,000	Garena	Battle royale	Free-to-play	
5	Animal Crossing: New Horizons	$2,000,000,000	Nintendo	Social sim	Buy-to-play	
6	Pokémon Go	$1,920,000,000	Niantic / Nintendo	AR	Free-to-play	
7	Call of Duty: Modern Warfare / Warzone	$1,913,000,000	Activision (Activision Blizzard)	FPS, Battle royale	Buy-to-play / free-to-play	
8	League of Legends	$1,750,000,000	Riot Games / Tencent	MOBA	Free-to-play	
9	Candy Crush Saga	$1,660,000,000	King (Activision Blizzard)	Puzzle	Free-to-play	
10	AFK Arena	$1,450,000,000	Lilith Games	RPG	Free-to-play	

=== Highest-grossing free-to-play games ===
The following titles were the top ten highest-grossing free-to-play games in 2020. Three of the top ten free-to-play titles are published by Tencent, which holds the top two spots.

Rank	Game	Revenue	Publisher(s)	Genre(s)	Ref.
1	PUBG Mobile / Game for Peace	$2,700,000,000	Tencent / Bluehole	Battle royale	
2	Honor of Kings / Arena of Valor	$2,564,000,000	Tencent	MOBA	
3	Roblox	$2,290,000,000	Roblox Corporation	GCS, MMO	
4	Garena Free Fire	$2,130,000,000	Garena	Battle royale	
5	Pokémon Go	$1,920,000,000	Niantic / Nintendo	AR	
6	League of Legends	$1,750,000,000	Riot Games / Tencent	MOBA	
7	Candy Crush Saga	$1,660,000,000	King (Activision Blizzard)	Puzzle	
8	AFK Arena	$1,450,000,000	Lilith Games	RPG	
9	Gardenscapes: New Acres	$1,430,000,000	Playrix	Puzzle	
10	Dungeon Fighter Online (DFO)	$1,410,000,000	Nexon / Tencent	Beat 'em up, Action RPG	

Fortnite grossed more than $1 billion in 2020, but less than $1.41 billion. It fell out of the top ten, dropping from its top spot in 2019.

=== Best-selling premium games ===
The following titles were the best-selling premium games (including buy-to-play titles) in 2020. Three of the top ten best-selling titles are published by Nintendo, including the year's top-selling game.

Rank	Game	Units sold	Revenue	Genre(s)	Publisher
1	Animal Crossing: New Horizons	31,800,000	$2,000,000,000	Social sim	Nintendo
2	Call of Duty: Modern Warfare	< 25,250,000 (Note: 30 million units sold between October 2019 and September 2020, 4.75 million digital units sold during October–November 2019.)	< $1,913,000,000 (Note: Call of Duty: Modern Warfare and free-to-play battle royale game Call of Duty: Warzone grossed a combined $1.913 billion in 2020.)	FPS, Battle royale	Activision (Activision Blizzard)
3	FIFA 20	Unknown	$1,083,000,000	Sports	EA Sports (Electronic Arts)
4	Grand Theft Auto V / Online	20,000,000	$911,000,000	Action-adventure	Rockstar Games (Take-Two Interactive)
5	Cyberpunk 2077	13,000,000	$609,000,000	Action RPG	CD Projekt
6	Among Us	12,700,000 (Note: Among Us sales: Steam – 9.5 million+ (est.); As of September 2020 – 10 million+; Up until April 2020 – 200,000–500,000; Nintendo Switch – 3.2 million)	Unknown	Party, Social deduction	Innersloth
7	Fall Guys: Ultimate Knockout	11,000,000	Unknown	Battle royale, Platformer	Devolver Digital
8	Mario Kart 8 Deluxe	10,450,000	Unknown	Kart racing	Nintendo
9	Super Mario 3D All-Stars	8,320,000	Unknown	Platformer	Nintendo
10	NBA 2K21	8,000,000	$889,000,000	Sports	2K Sports (Take-Two Interactive)

=== Best-selling games by region ===
The following were 2020's top ten best-selling video games by region (excluding microtransactions and free-to-play titles) on PC and console platforms, for Australia, Japan, Europe, and the United States.

Rank	Australia	Japan (Note: Best-selling games by physical unit sales)	Europe	United States (Note: Highest-grossing games by sales revenue)
1	Animal Crossing: New Horizons	Animal Crossing: New Horizons	FIFA 21	Call of Duty: Black Ops Cold War
2	Grand Theft Auto V	Ring Fit Adventure	Grand Theft Auto V	Call of Duty: Modern Warfare
3	Call of Duty: Black Ops Cold War	Momotaro Dentetsu: Showa, Heisei, Reiwa Mo Teiban!	Animal Crossing: New Horizons (Note: Not including digital sales)	Animal Crossing: New Horizons
4	Call of Duty: Modern Warfare	Final Fantasy VII Remake	FIFA 20	Madden NFL 21
5	Mario Kart 8 Deluxe	Pokémon Sword / Shield	Call of Duty: Black Ops Cold War	Assassin's Creed Valhalla
6	FIFA 21	Mario Kart 8 Deluxe	Mario Kart 8 Deluxe	The Last of Us Part II
7	Assassin's Creed Valhalla	Super Smash Bros. Ultimate	The Last of Us Part II	Ghost of Tsushima
8	The Last of Us Part II	Minecraft: Switch Edition	Assassin's Creed Valhalla	Mario Kart 8 Deluxe
9	NBA 2K20	Clubhouse Games: 51 Worldwide Classics	Call of Duty: Modern Warfare	Super Mario 3D All-Stars
10	NBA 2K21	Super Mario 3D All-Stars	Red Dead Redemption 2	Final Fantasy VII Remake

== Top-rated games ==
=== Critically acclaimed games ===
Metacritic is an aggregator of video game journalism reviews. It generally considers expansions and re-releases as separate entities.

Releases scoring 90/100 or higher on Metacritic in 2020
Title	Developer(s)	Publisher(s)	Release	Platform(s)	Average score
Persona 5 Royal	Atlus	Atlus / Sega	March 31, 2020	PS4	95
Dragon Quest XI S: Echoes of an Elusive Age - Definitive Edition	Square Enix		December 4, 2020	PS4, XBO	93
Hades	Supergiant Games		September 17, 2020	WIN, NS	93
Half-Life: Alyx	Valve		March 23, 2020	WIN, LIN	93
Ori and the Will of the Wisps	Moon Studios	Iam8bit	September 17, 2020	NS	93
The Last of Us Part II	Naughty Dog	Sony Interactive Entertainment	June 19, 2020	PS4	93
Demon's Souls	Bluepoint Games / Japan Studio	Sony Interactive Entertainment	November 12, 2020	PS5	92
Crusader Kings III	Paradox Development Studio	Paradox Interactive	September 1, 2020	WIN, LIN	91
F1 2020	Codemasters Birmingham	Codemasters	July 10, 2020	XBO	91
Microsoft Flight Simulator	Asobo Studio	Xbox Game Studios	August 18, 2020	WIN	91
Spelunky 2	Mossmouth, BlitWorks	Mossmouth	September 29, 2020	WIN	91
Animal Crossing: New Horizons	Nintendo EPD	Nintendo	March 20, 2020	NS	90
Ori and the Will of the Wisps	Moon Studios	Xbox Game Studios	March 11, 2020	XBO	90
Yakuza 0	Ryu Ga Gotoku Studio	Sega	February 26, 2020	XBO	90

=== Major awards ===
Category/Organization		38th Golden Joystick Awards November 24, 2020	The Game Awards 2020 December 10, 2020	17th British Academy Games Awards March 25, 2021	24th Annual D.I.C.E. Awards April 22, 2021	21st Game Developers Choice Awards July 21, 2021	
Game of the Year		The Last of Us Part II		Hades			
Independent / Debut (Note: Some award presentations combine these categories.)	Indie	Hades	Hades	Carrion	Hades	Phasmophobia	
Independent / Debut	Debut	Hades	Phasmophobia	Carrion	Hades	Phasmophobia	
Mobile		Lego Builder's Journey	Among Us	—N/a	Legends of Runeterra	Genshin Impact	
VR/AR		—N/a	Half-Life: Alyx	—N/a	Half-Life: Alyx		
Artistic Achievement	Animation	The Last of Us Part II	Ghost of Tsushima	The Last of Us Part II		Ghost of Tsushima	
Artistic Achievement	Art Direction	The Last of Us Part II	Ghost of Tsushima	Hades	Ghost of Tsushima	Ghost of Tsushima	
Audio	Music	The Last of Us Part II	Final Fantasy VII Remake	Spider-Man: Miles Morales	Ghost of Tsushima	Hades	
Audio	Sound Design	The Last of Us Part II	The Last of Us Part II	Ghost of Tsushima		Hades	
Character or Performance	Leading Role	Sandra Saad as Kamala Khan; Marvel's Avengers	Laura Bailey as Abby; The Last of Us Part II	Laura Bailey as Abby; The Last of Us Part II	Miles Morales; Spider-Man: Miles Morales	—N/a	
Character or Performance	Supporting Role	Sandra Saad as Kamala Khan; Marvel's Avengers	Laura Bailey as Abby; The Last of Us Part II	Logan Cunningham as multiple characters (Note: Cunningham won for his performance as Hades, Achilles, Poseidon, Asterius, Charon, and the Storyteller.); Hades	Miles Morales; Spider-Man: Miles Morales	—N/a	
Game Design or Direction	Game Design	—N/a	The Last of Us Part II	Hades	Hades	Hades	
Game Design or Direction	Game Direction	—N/a	The Last of Us Part II	Hades	Hades	Hades	
Narrative		The Last of Us Part II		Hades	The Last of Us Part II		
Technical Achievement		—N/a		Dreams		Microsoft Flight Simulator	
Multiplayer / Online		Fall Guys: Ultimate Knockout	Among Us	Animal Crossing: New Horizons	Fall Guys: Ultimate Knockout	—N/a	
Action		—N/a	Hades	—N/a	Hades	—N/a	
Adventure		—N/a	The Last of Us Part II	—N/a	Ghost of Tsushima	—N/a	
Family		Fall Guys: Ultimate Knockout	Animal Crossing: New Horizons	Sackboy: A Big Adventure	Animal Crossing: New Horizons	—N/a	
Fighting		—N/a	Mortal Kombat 11 Ultimate	—N/a	Mortal Kombat 11 Ultimate	—N/a	
Role-Playing		—N/a	Final Fantasy VII Remake	—N/a	Final Fantasy VII Remake	—N/a	
Sports/Racing	Sports	—N/a	Tony Hawk's Pro Skater 1 + 2	—N/a	Tony Hawk's Pro Skater 1 + 2	—N/a	
Sports/Racing	Racing	—N/a	Tony Hawk's Pro Skater 1 + 2	—N/a	Mario Kart Live: Home Circuit	—N/a	
Strategy/Simulation		—N/a	Microsoft Flight Simulator	—N/a	Microsoft Flight Simulator	—N/a	
Social Impact		—N/a	Tell Me Why	Animal Crossing: New Horizons	—N/a	—N/a	
Special Award		—N/a		BAFTA Fellowship	—N/a	Pioneer Award	Lifetime Achievement
Special Award		—N/a		Siobhan Reddy	—N/a	Tom Fulp	Laralyn McWilliams

== Major events ==
Date	Event	Ref.
January 21	Daybreak Games was split into three separate game development studios: Dimensional Ink Games, Darkpaw Games, and Rogue Planet Games; and Daybreak was reorganized into a publisher.	
January 22	Tencent announced that it would fully acquire Norwegian developer and publisher Funcom.	
January 24	Activision Blizzard entered a multiyear deal with Google to exclusively broadcast all their esport content, via YouTube following the conclusion of a prior deal with Twitch.	
January 24	The Call of Duty League launched its inaugural season.	
February 5	Rod Fergusson left his role as lead on the Gears of War series at The Coalition to oversee the Diablo series at Blizzard Entertainment.	
February 8	The 2020 Overwatch League season began.	
February 11–13	Academy of Interactive Arts & Sciences hosted the 2020 D.I.C.E. Summit and 23rd Annual D.I.C.E. Awards at the Aria Resort and Casino in Las Vegas, Nevada. Connie Booth inducted into the AIAS Hall of Fame.	
February 19	World War Z developer Saber Interactive was acquired by Embracer Group for US$525 million.	
February 25	Sanzaru Games was acquired by Oculus Studios.	
February 27 – March 1	PAX East was held in Boston, Massachusetts.	
March 4	Star Theory Games was shut down.	
March 11	Rockstar Games' co-founder and lead writer Dan Houser left the company.	
March 11	Entertainment Software Association announced that E3 2020 has been canceled due to the COVID-19 pandemic.	
March 16–20	The 2020 Game Developers Conference was held virtually due to the COVID-19 pandemic.	
March 31	The Pokémon Company announced that the World Championships has been canceled due to the COVID-19 pandemic.	
April 3	Science Adventure developer Mages was acquired by Colopl for ¥1.612 billion (approximately US$14.92 million).	
April 17	Video game-centric crowdfunding and investment firm Fig was acquired by Republic, a larger investment firm, to expand Fig's capabilities for funding options.	
May 1	The first Summer Game Fest is held.	
May 22	Bandai Namco Entertainment officially celebrate the 40th anniversary of Pac-Man.	
June 11	Sony Interactive Entertainment held its "PS5 – The Future of Gaming" event where it unveiled the PlayStation 5 design and several new and upcoming games.	
June 22	Microsoft announces the closure of its Mixer stream service on July 22, instead transitioning and partnering with Facebook Gaming.	
June 22	Ready at Dawn was acquired by Oculus Studios.	
June 29	Deck13 Interactive was acquired by Focus Home Interactive.	
July 22	Microsoft's video game livestreaming service Mixer is shut down after four years.	
August 10–16	Playcrafting hosted its fourth annual Play NYC event online this year. Panels included talks from Avalanche Studios, Private Division, and Rockstar Games. The event was also home to the annual Graffiti Games. This year's initiative highlighted the work of black game developers.	
August 13	Embracer Group, using the Saber Interactive label, acquired 4A Games and New World Interactive.	
August 13	Epic Games released a version of Fortnite Battle Royale on iOS and Android that bypassed the stores' payment systems, leading to both Apple and Google to delist the game immediately, with Epic further turning around the same day to file lawsuits challenging the monopolistic behavior of both stores.	
August 27–30	An online version of Gamescom 2020 was held, after Germany banned physical events through August 2020.	
September 4	Nintendo celebrated the 35th anniversary of Super Mario Bros. by announcing new games, re-released games, and merchandise.	
September 12–20	An online-only version of PAX East, called the Global PAX Online Experience, was held.	
September 16	Embracer Group acquired Vertigo Games for €50 million.	
September 18	Rayman and Beyond Good & Evil creator Michel Ancel announced he would be leaving from the video game industry to focus full-time on a wildlife sanctuary. Ancel stated via Instagram that his two upcoming projects, Beyond Good & Evil 2 and Wild were in capable hands with his departure.	
September 19–20	The Game Devs of Color Expo was held.	
September 21	Xbox Game Studios and ZeniMax Media announced plans for Xbox Game Studios to acquire ZeniMax and its subsidiaries Bethesda Game Studios, Arkane Studios, id Software, MachineGames, and Tango Gameworks for US$7.5 billion, to be completed by the first half of 2021.	
September 23–27	A digital version of Tokyo Game Show was held.	
September 24	Amazon announced they would launch a cloud gaming service Luna. Games on the service would be offered via a channel-style subscription service, with the company's own games and those from Ubisoft available at the service's launch in October.	
October 14	Rockstar Games acquired Ruffian Games, which became part of the company as Rockstar Dundee.	
October 15	Blizzard Entertainment announced that they are no longer producing new content for Starcraft II after ten years.	
October 21	Serious Sam developer Croteam was acquired by Devolver Digital.	
November 10	Take-Two Interactive and Codemasters agreed to a Take-Two buyout of Codemasters in a stock and cash deal around US$994 million, expected to be completed by early 2021.	
November 19	Roblox Corporation filed for its initial public offering, estimated at US$37 billion.	
December 3	BioWare general manager and Mass Effect director Casey Hudson and Dragon Age executive producer Mark Darrah both announced that they were leaving the studio.	
December 10	The Game Awards 2020 was held, hosted and livestreamed from locations in Los Angeles, London, and Tokyo.	
December 14	Electronic Arts outbid Take-Two in acquiring Codemasters in a deal valued at about US$1.2 billion, expected to be completed by the first quarter of 2021.	
December 23	Tencent completed their acquisition of Leyou, the parent company of Digital Extremes and Splash Damage among others, for US$1.5 billion.	
December 31	Adobe Flash, which was used for certain online games, is officially discontinued.	

=== Impacts of the COVID-19 pandemic ===
The highly contagious coronavirus disease 2019, first observed in China in December 2019, began a major outbreak across the world in January 2020, which is ongoing as of November 2021. Within China, steps to prevent spread of the disease came around such as large-scale quarantine of affected populations which have impacted production within the country. This has had a large number of impacts on social, medical, and economic systems worldwide. The video game industry has been impacted by the outbreak in various ways, most often due to concerns over travel to and from China or elsewhere, or related to slowdowns in manufacturing processes within China. Numerous games have been delayed due to the COVID-19 pandemic, and most industry events were cancelled or reformated into virtual showcases.

The video game industry in general was boosted by the pandemic, since people under pandemic lockdowns were forced to stay home, with video games becoming a popular pastime. Total spending in video games grew to US$33.7 billion in the United States during the first nine months of 2020 compared to US$27.9 billion for the same period in 2019. Easy-to-learn games with little to no narrative and large audience enjoyment potential, including Fall Guys, Among Us, and the Jackbox Party Packs, saw great increases in popularity during the pandemic as a means to avoid the "cultural trauma" of the situation.

=== Reactions to the George Floyd protests ===
In the wake of the George Floyd protests and resurgence of support for the Black Lives Matter (BLM) movement across several entertainment sectors in June 2020, the video game industry also responded. Most large publishers and developers shared their support of the protests and BLM as with other larger entertainment companies. A number of video game announcement events had been planned on the week of June 6 and onward as a virtual replacement for E3 2020 (cancelled from the COVID-19 pandemic), but most of these were shifted by a week or more to allow the voices of the protests to have the necessary focus. Many companies announced plans to donate funds towards black-oriented organizations, including Electronic Arts, 2K Games, Riot Games and Humble Bundle committing US$1 million to such foundations, while others like Ubisoft, Square Enix and The Pokémon Company also committed to significant donations. Itch.io raised over US$8.1 million for black charities through sales of a game bundle with games from over 1,300 developers. Electronic Arts and Infinity Ward pledged to combat racism that they were aware had persisted by users in their games in light of the events.

=== Sexual misconduct accusations ===
In late June and early July, as a continuation of prior #MeToo movement effects on the industry from 2017, several people started speaking out of specific accounts of sexual misconduct and harassment towards others in the industry. Initial complaints had been directed towards Twitch streamers but soon had reached major companies including Insomniac Games, and Electronic Arts, with most studios taking actions to deal with the accused and instituting better policies to handle internal and external issued related to sexual misconduct. In particular, charges were made toward the CEO of Evolution Championship Series (EVO), Joey Cuellar, who was subsequently let go. Multiple publishers that had backed the event had pulled out on this news, and the EVO event, which had already been reworked as an online event due to the COVID-19 pandemic, was subsequently cancelled. A large number of cases were found through Ubisoft's executive-level staff, leading to a number of high-level departures and major internal review of how the company handled such complaints in the future.

== Notable deaths ==
- January 26 – Kobe Bryant, 41, basketball player who appeared in every NBA 2K game since NBA 2K9 (cover star of NBA 2K10, NBA 2K17, NBA 2K21 and NBA 2K24)
- February 25 – Kazuhisa Hashimoto, 61, video game developer and creator of the Konami code
- April 8 – Rick May, 79, voice actor best known for the voice of Soldier in Team Fortress 2.
- April 11 – Paul Haddad, 56, voice actor best known for the original voice of Leon Kennedy in the 1998 Resident Evil video game sequel Resident Evil 2.
- May 17 – Shad Gaspard, 39, pro wrestler who appeared in the WWE SmackDown vs. Raw games and provided motion capture for God of War.
- July 2 – Reckful, 31, Twitch streamer and esports player.
- July 25 – Regis Philbin, 88, TV host who appeared in 1999's Who Wants to Be a Millionaire and other video games based on the series.
- August 31 – Norm Spencer, 62, actor best known for portraying Cyclops in the Marvel vs. Capcom games.
- November 8 – Alex Trebek, 80, TV game show host who appeared in the Jeopardy! games.
- November 18 – Kirby Morrow, 47, voice actor (Gundam, Inuyasha, Ninjago).
- December 1 – Eric Engstrom, one of the three Microsoft "Beastie Boys" that helped to pioneer DirectX.
- December 26 – Brodie Lee, 41, pro wrestler (WWE 2K, AEW Fight Forever).

== Hardware releases ==
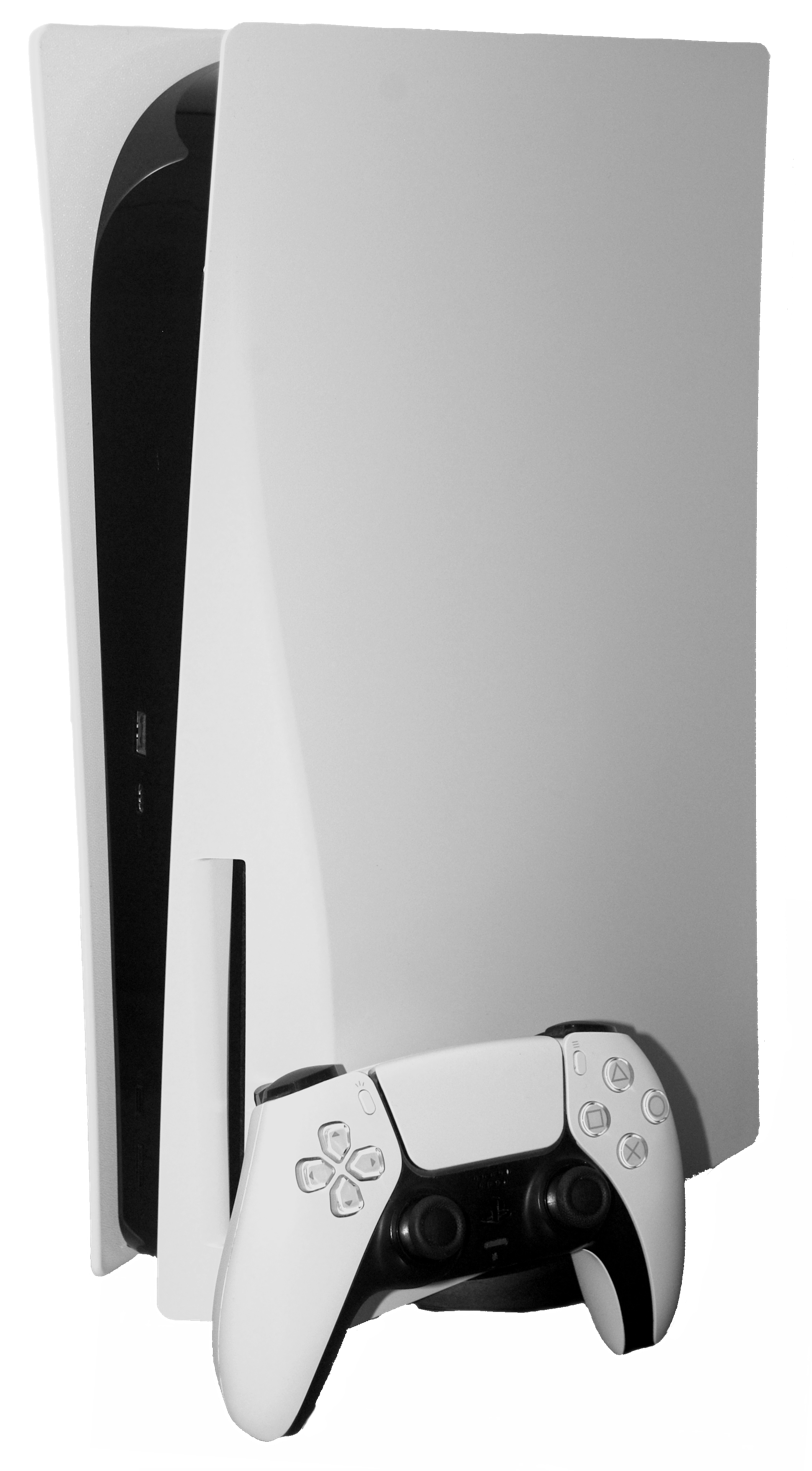
PlayStation 5

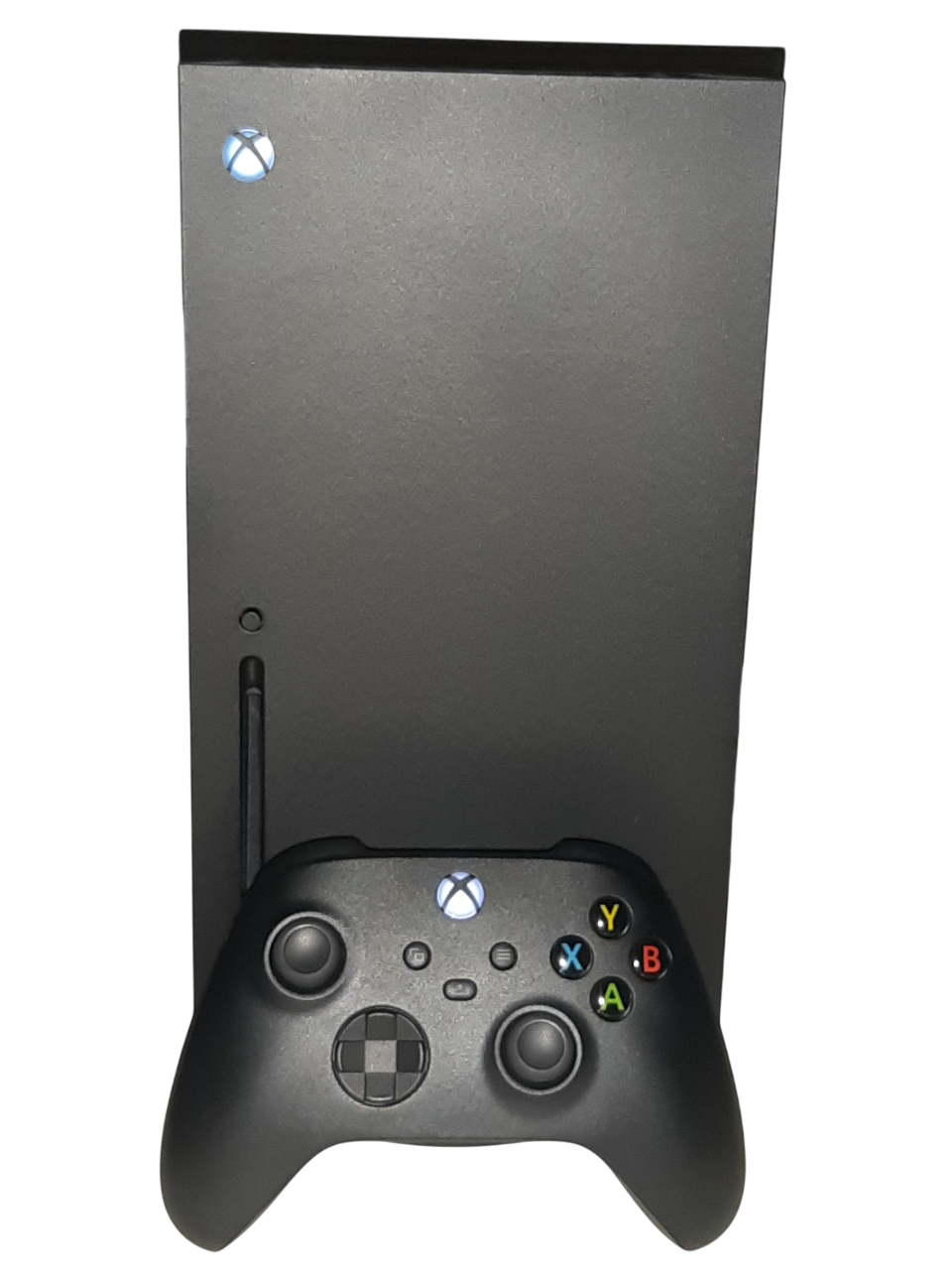
Xbox Series X

The list of game-related hardware released in 2020.

Date	Console	Manufacturer	Ref.
May 22	Evercade	Blaze Entertainment	
May 22	TurboGrafx-16 Mini	Konami	
June 6	Game Gear Micro	Sega	
October 13	Oculus Quest 2	Reality Labs	
November 10	Xbox Series X and Series S	Microsoft	
November 12	PlayStation 5	Sony	
November 13	Game & Watch: Super Mario Bros.	Nintendo	
December 14	Atari VCS (Note: Kickstarter backers only, wide release was on June 15, 2021.)	Atari	

Major hardware discontinuations in 2020 include the Xbox One X and Xbox One S All-Digital versions, which were discontinued on July 16. The Nintendo 3DS family was discontinued on September 17.

== Video game-based film and television releases ==
Title	Date	Type	Distributor(s)	Franchise	Original game publisher(s)	Ref.
Darwin's Game	January 3, 2020	Anime television series	Tokyo MX (Japan)	—N/a	—N/a	
Pokémon: Twilight Wings	January 15, 2020	Limited anime webseries	YouTube	Pokémon	Nintendo; The Pokémon Company	
Sonic the Hedgehog	February 14, 2020	Feature film	Paramount Pictures	Sonic the Hedgehog	Sega	
Glitch Techs	February 21, 2020	Animated series	Netflix	—N/a	—N/a	
Sakura Wars: The Animation	April 3, 2020	Anime television series	Funimation	Sakura Wars	Sega	
Mortal Kombat Legends: Scorpion's Revenge	April 12, 2020	Animated film	Warner Bros. Home Entertainment	Mortal Kombat	Midway Games	
Pokétoon	June 5, 2020	Web anime	YouTube	Pokémon	Nintendo; The Pokémon Company	
Ninjala	June 23, 2020	Limited animated webseries	YouTube	Ninjala	GungHo Online Entertainment	
The Sims Spark'd	July 17, 2020	Reality competition TV series	TBS	The Sims	Electronic Arts	
Dragon's Dogma	September 17, 2020	Anime series	Netflix	Dragon's Dogma	Capcom	
Console Wars	September 23, 2020	Documentary film	CBS All Access	Console Wars	—N/a	
Dragon Quest: The Adventure of Dai	October 3, 2020	Anime television series	Toei Animation	Dragon Quest	Square Enix	
Grand Blues!	October 8, 2020	Anime television series	Funimation	Granblue Fantasy	Cygames	
Pokémon Master Journeys: The Series	December 11, 2020 (Note: The series debuted on Netflix in September 2021, and released consequent batches of episodes every 4 months till May 2022.)	Anime television series	TV Tokyo (Japan); Netflix (United States)	Pokémon	Nintendo; The Pokémon Company	
Monster Hunter	December 18, 2020	Feature film	Screen Gems	Monster Hunter	Capcom	
Secrets of the Jungle	December 25, 2020 (Note: The film made its VOD debut on Netflix worldwide in October 2021, except for Japan, Korea and China.)	Anime film	Toho (Japan); Netflix (international)	Pokémon	Nintendo; The Pokémon Company	

== See also ==
- 2020 in esports
- 2020 in games
