= Console Wars =

Console Wars may refer to:

- Console war, a video game term referring to the competition for market dominance among console manufacturers
- Console Wars (book), a 2014 book
  - Console Wars (film), a 2020 documentary based on the book
