= Console war =

Video game industry term

A console war is the competition between two or more video game console manufacturers. While console manufacturers are generally always trying to outperform other manufacturers in sales, these console wars engage in more direct tactics to compare their offerings directly against their competitors or to disparage the competition in contrast to their own, and thus the marketing efforts have tended to escalate in back-and-forth pushes.

The term became popular to describe competition between Sega and Nintendo during the late 1980s and early 1990s as Sega attempted to break into the United States video game market with its Sega Genesis console. Through a novel marketing approach and improved hardware, Sega had been able to gain a majority of the video game console market by 1991, three years after the Genesis' launch. This caused back and forth competition between the two companies throughout the early 1990s. Nintendo eventually regained its market share and Sega stopped making home console hardware by 2001.

A second major console war was between Sony's line of PlayStation consoles and Microsoft's Xbox consoles, which outside of Nintendo were the only major console manufacturers in the 21st century. This war has been driven by first-party titles developed by the companies' respective internal studios (PlayStation Studios and Xbox Game Studios) and their exclusivity on their respective platforms.

== Background and etymology ==
The video game console market started in 1972 with the release of the first home console, the Magnavox Odyssey. As more manufacturers entered the market and technology improved, the market began to coalesce around releases of more advanced hardware every few years on a predictable cycle, which are typically grouped into generations. Since 1972, there have been nine console generations, with two to three dominant manufacturers controlling the marketplace.

As with most industries without a single dominant leader, console manufacturers have marketed their products in a manner to highlight them in a more favorable manner compared to their competitors', or to focus on features that their competitors may lack, often in aggressive manners. For example, console manufacturers in the 1980s and 1990s heavily relied on the word size of the central processor unit, emphasizing that games had better capabilities with 16-bit processors over 8-bit ones. This type of aggressive marketing led video game journalists to call the competitive marketing a "war" or "battle" as early as August 1988. As each new console generation emerged with new marketing approaches, journalists and consumers continued to use variations of the "war" language, including "system wars" and "console wars". By the early 2000s, the term "console war" was most commonly used to describe heated competition between console manufacturers within any generation.

== Nintendo versus Sega ==
While not the only console war, the rivalry between Sega and Nintendo for dominance of the North American video game market in the late 1980s and early 1990s is generally the most visible example of a console war. It established the use of aggressive marketing and advertising tactics by each company to try to gain control of the marketplace, and ended around 1995 when a new competitor, Sony, entered and disrupted the console space.

=== Background ===
The United States video game industry suffered a severe market crash in 1983 from numerous factors which led to a larger market recession and increasing popularity of personal computers as a video game platform. A key contributing factor to the crash was the loss of publishing control for console games. Early success by some of the first third-party developers like Activision for the Atari VCS console led to venture capitalists bringing in teams of inexperienced programmers to try to capture the same success, but only managed to flood the market with poor quality games, which made it difficult for good quality games to sell. The video game crash impacted other factors in the industry that were already in decline, such as video game arcades.

In Japan, Nintendo had released its Famicom (Family Computer) console in 1983, one of the first consoles of the third generation. Japan did not have a similar third-party development system in place, and Nintendo maintained control on the manufacturing of game cartridges for the Famicom using a licensing model to limit which third-party games were published on it. Nintendo looked to release the unit in the United States, but recognized that the market was still struggling from the 1983 crash. Nintendo took several steps to redesign the Famicom prior to a United States launch. It was made to look like a VCR unit rather than a console, and was given the name the "Nintendo Entertainment System" to distance it from being a video game console. Further, Nintendo added a special 10NES lockout system that worked as a lock-and-key system with game cartridges to further prevent unauthorized games from being published for the system and avoid the loss of publishing control that had caused the 1983 crash. The NES revitalized the U.S. video game industry and established Nintendo as the dominant name in video game consoles over Atari. In lifetime sales, the NES had sold nearly 62 million units worldwide, with 34 million in North America.

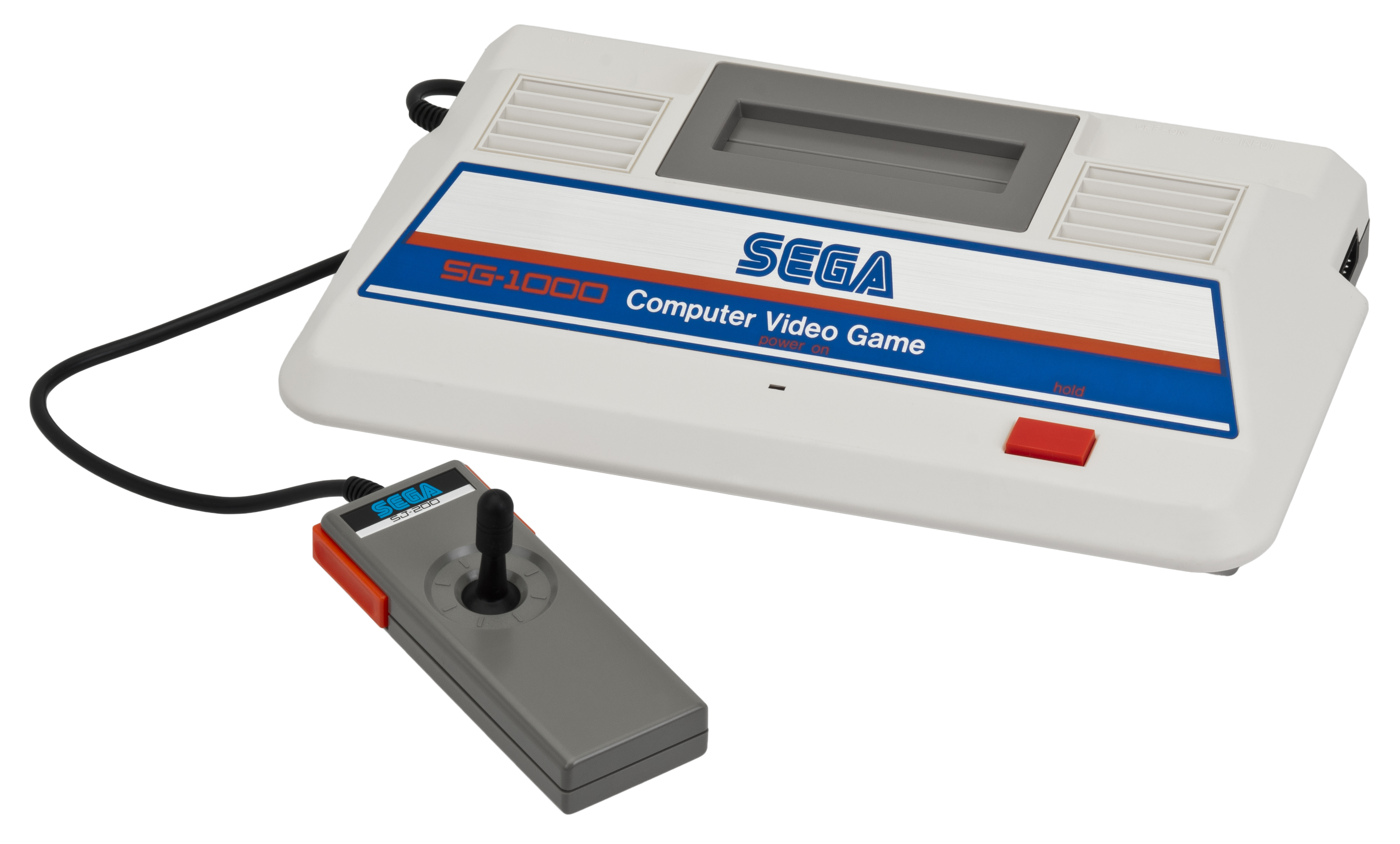
The Sega SG-1000 console

At the same time, Sega was looking to get into the video game console industry as well, having been a successful arcade game manufacturer, but due to the downturn in arcade game business, looked to use that expertise for the home market. They released the SG-1000 console in Japan the same day as the Famicom in 1983, but sold only 160,000 units of the SG-1000 in its first year.

Sega redesigned the SG-1000 twice to try to build a system to challenge Nintendo's dominance; the SG-1000 Mark II remained compatible with the SG-1000 but failed to gain any further sales. The next iteration, the Sega Mark III, was released in 1985, using Sega's arcade hardware for its internals to provide more refined graphics. The console was slightly more powerful than the Famicom, and Sega's marketing attempted to push on the more advanced graphics their system offered over the Famicom. Sega attempted to follow Nintendo with a worldwide release of the Mark III, rebranded as the Master System. The Master System was released in the United States in 1986, but Nintendo of America developed a licensing plan in the U.S. to keep developers exclusive to the NES, limiting the library of games that Sega could offer and to also ensure that another gaming crash did not begin. Further, Sega's third-party distributor, the toy company Tonka, opted against localizing several of the Japanese games Sega had created, further capping the game library Sega could offer in the U.S. Only a total estimated two million systems were sold.

=== Entering the United States market ===
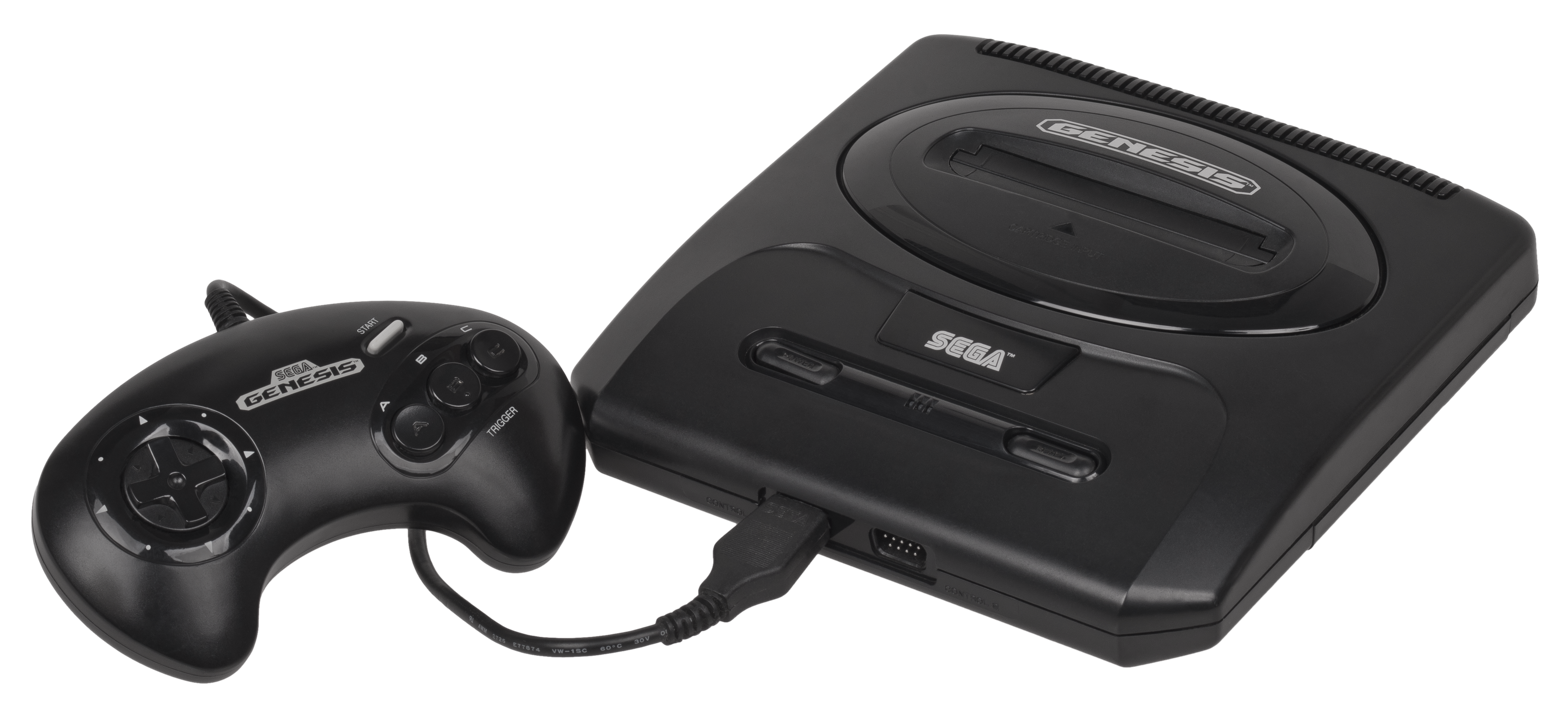
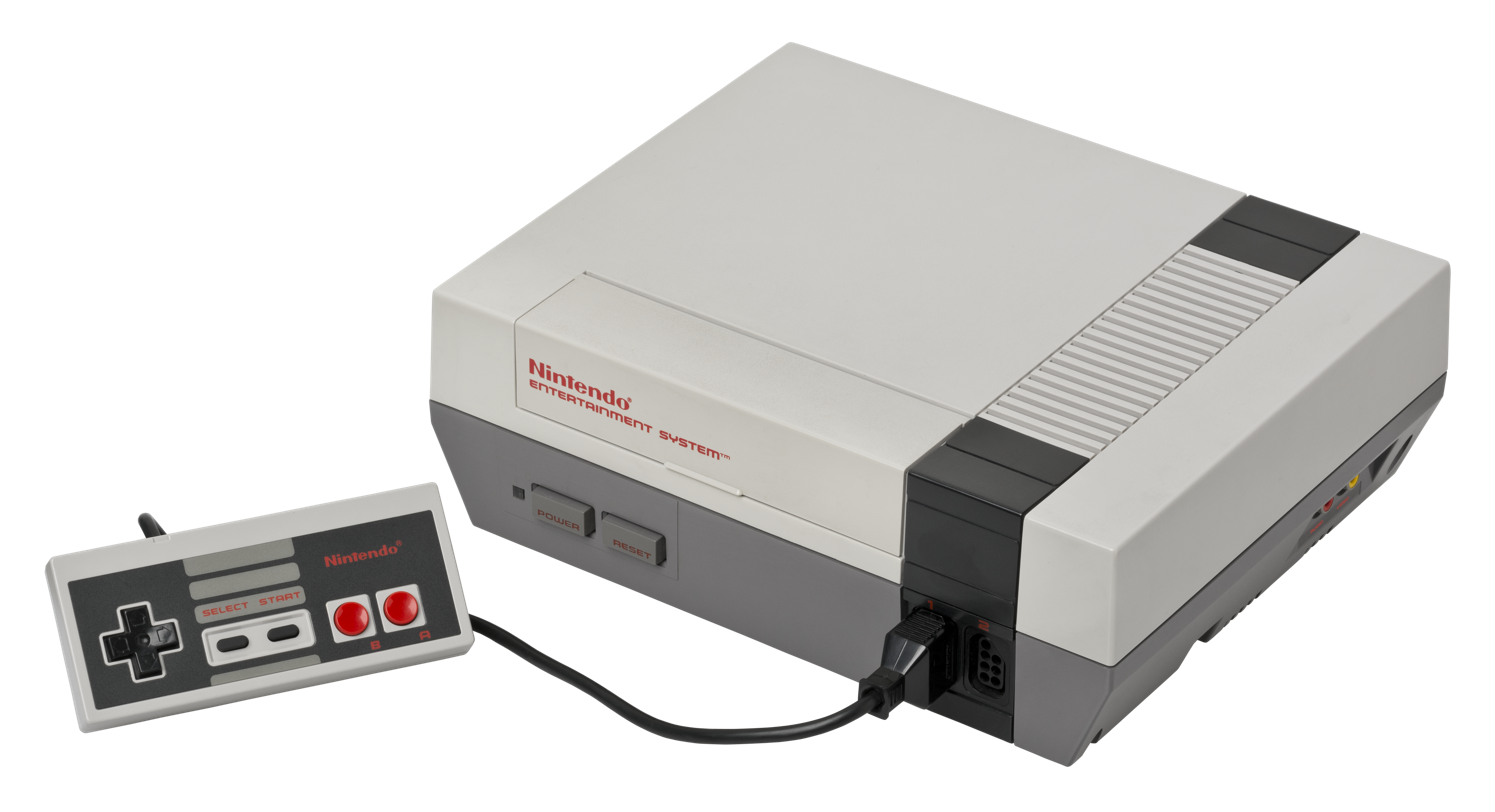
The Sega and Nintendo console war primarily centered on the launch of the Sega Genesis (top) to try to outsell the Nintendo Entertainment System in the United States.

The fourth generation of video game consoles was started by the launch of NEC's PC Engine in 1987 in Japan. While the PC Engine used an 8-bit CPU, it included 16-bit graphic rendering components, and NEC marketed this heavily as a 16-bit game console to distinguish it from the Famicom and Mark III; when NEC brought the PC Engine worldwide, it was rebranded as the "TurboGrafx-16" to emphasize this. After the release of the TurboGrafx-16, use of the bit designation caught on, which led manufacturers to focus their advertising heavily on the number of bits in a console system for the next two console generations.

NEC was one of many competitors to Sega and Nintendo. Following a similar path they had done for the Mark III, Sega used their arcade game technology, now using 16-bit processor boards, and adapted those into a home console, released in Japan in October 1988 as the Mega Drive. Compared to its prior consoles, the Mega Drive was designed to be more mature-looking and less like a toy compared to the Famicom to appeal to an older demographic of gamers, and "16-bit" was emblazoned on the console's case to emphasize this feature. While the system was positively received by gaming magazines like Famitsu, it was overshadowed by the release a week prior of Super Mario Bros. 3 for the Famicom.

As with the Master System, Sega also planned for a major push of the Mega Drive into the United States to challenge Nintendo's dominance among other markets, with the unit rebranded as the Sega Genesis. Sega was dissatisfied with Tonka's handling of the Master System and so sought a new partner through the Atari Corporation led by Jack Tramiel. Tramiel was bullish on the Genesis due to its cost, and turned down the offer, instead focusing more on the company's computer offerings. Sega instead used its dormant Sega of America branch to run a limited launch of the console in August 1989 in test markets of New York City and Los Angeles, with its launch system being bundled with the port of the arcade game Altered Beast.

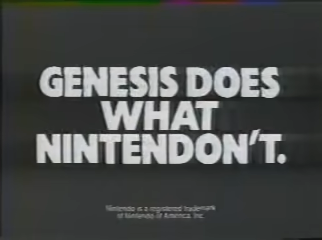
Screenshot from a "Genesis does what Nintendon't" commercial

In October 1989, the company named former Atari Entertainment Electronics Division president Michael Katz as CEO of Sega of America to implement a marketing strategy for a nation-wide push of the Genesis with a target of one million consoles. Katz used a two-prong strategy to challenge Nintendo. The first was to stress the arcade-like capabilities of the Genesis with the capabilities of games like Altered Beast compared to the simpler 8-bit graphics of the NES, and devising slogans such as "Genesis does what Nintendon't." Katz also observed that Nintendo still held most of the rights to arcade game ports for the NES, so the second part of his strategy was to work with the Japanese headquarters of Sega to pay celebrities for their naming rights for games like Pat Riley Basketball, Arnold Palmer Golf, Joe Montana Football, and Michael Jackson's Moonwalker.

Most of these games were developed by Sega's Japanese programmers, though notably, Joe Montana Football had originally been developed by Mediagenic, the new name for Activision after it had become more involved in publishing and business application development alongside games. Mediagenic had started a football game which Katz wanted to brand under Joe Montana's name, but unknown to Katz at the time, the game was only partially finished due to internal strife at Mediagenic. After the deal had been completed and Katz learned of this, he took the game to Electronic Arts. Electronic Arts had already made itself a significant force in the industry as they had been able to reverse engineer the cartridge format for both the NES and the Genesis, though Electronic Arts' CEO Trip Hawkins felt it was better for the company to develop for the Genesis. Electronic Arts used their reverse engineering knowledge as part of their negotiations with Sega to secure a freer licensing contract to develop openly on the Genesis, which proved beneficial for both companies. At the time Katz had secured Mediagenic's Joe Montana football, Electronic Arts was working on its John Madden Football series for personal computers. Electronic Arts was able to help bring Joe Montana Football, more as an arcade title compared to the strategic John Madden Football, to reality, as well as bringing John Madden Football over as a Genesis title.

=== The second push in 1991 ===
The Genesis still struggled in the United States against Nintendo, and only sold about 500,000 units by mid-1990. Nintendo had released Super Mario Bros. 3 in February 1990 which further drove sales away from Sega's system. Nintendo themselves did not seem to be affected by either Sega's or NEC's entry into the console market. Sega's president Hayao Nakayama wanted the company to develop an iconic mascot character and build a game around it as one means to challenge Nintendo's own Mario mascot. Company artist Naoto Ohshima came up with the concept of Sonic the Hedgehog, a fast anthropomorphic character with an "attitude" that would appeal to teenagers and incorporating the blue color of Sega's logo, and Yuji Naka helped to develop the game Sonic the Hedgehog to showcase the character as well as the graphics and processing speed of the Genesis. The game was ready by early 1991 and launched in North America in June 1991.

Separately, Sega fired Katz and replaced him with Tom Kalinske as Sega of America's new CEO in mid-1990. Kalinske had been president of Mattel and did not have much experience in video games but recognized the razor and blades model, and developed a new strategy for Sega's push to challenge Nintendo's dominance in America with four key decisions, which included cutting the price of the Genesis from $189 to $149, and continue the same aggressive marketing campaigns to make the Genesis look "cool" over the NES and of Nintendo's upcoming Super Nintendo Entertainment System (SNES). Further, Kalinske pushed hard for American developers like Electronic Arts to create games on the Genesis that would better fit American preferences, particularly sports simulation games which the console had gained a reputation for. Finally, Kalinske insisted on making Sonic the Hedgehog the bundled game on the system following its release in June 1991, replacing Altered Beast and even offering those that had purchased a Genesis with Altered Beast a trade-in replacement for Sonic.

Under Kalinske, Sega also revamped its advertising approach, aiming for more of a young adult audience, as Nintendo still was positioning the SNES as a child-friendly console. Advertising focused on Sonic, the edgier games in the Genesis library, and its larger library of sports games which appealed to this group. Television ads for the Genesis and its games ended with the "Sega Scream" – a character shouting the name "Sega" to the camera in the final shot – which also caught on quickly.

These changes, all predating the SNES's planned North American release in September 1991, gave Sega its first gain on Nintendo in the U.S. market. Further, a price cut to $149 made the Genesis a cheaper option than the planned $199 price for the SNES led many families to purchase the Genesis instead of waiting for the SNES. The Genesis had a larger library of games for the U.S. with over 150 titles by the time the SNES launched alongside eight games, and Sega continued to push out titles that drew continuous press throughout the year, whereas with the SNES, its game library was generally held up by flagship Mario and Zelda games that only came at out once a year, along with less which further made the Genesis a more desirable option.

Nintendo, until 1991, had been passive towards Sega's approach in North America, but as the SNES launch approach, the company recognized that it was losing ground. The company shifted it advertising in North America to focus on more of the advanced features of the SNES that were not present in the Genesis, such as its Mode 7 to create simulated 3D perspective effects. When the SNES launched, this would be most prominently seen with the release of F-Zero, where the 3D made the game look more complex, compared to earlier 3rd person racing games on home consoles. Pilotwings used Mode 7 to better simulate the landings that would happen, after players completed the other objectives in the level. The initial shipment of one million SNES units sold out quickly and a total of 3.4 million SNES were sold by the end of 1991, a record for a new console launch, but the Genesis maintained strong sales against the SNES. The Genesis's resilience against the SNES led several of Nintendo's third-party developers to break their exclusive development agreements with Nintendo and seek out licenses to also develop for Genesis. These developers included Acclaim, Konami, Tecmo, Taito, and Capcom, the latter of which arranged to have a special licensing mechanism with Sega that allowed them to publish select titles exclusively for the Genesis.

During this period, the push for marketing by both Nintendo and Sega led to the growth of video game magazines. Nintendo had already established Nintendo Power in 1988 in part to serve as a help guide for players on its popular titles, and was able to use this further to advertise the SNES and upcoming games. Numerous other titles grew in the late 1980s and early 1990s, giving Sega the opportunity to market its games heavily in these publications.

=== The war escalates in 1992 and 1993 ===
Nintendo publicly acknowledged that it knew it was no longer in the dominant position in the console market by 1992. A year into the SNES's release, the SNES's price was lowered to $149 to match the Genesis, to which Sega reduced the Genesis to $129 shortly after. The SNES was helped by Capcom's decision to maintain exclusivity of its home port of its popular brawler arcade game Street Fighter II: The World Warrior to the SNES when it was released in June 1992. Nintendo also experimented with including processing chips within game cartridges to augment to power of the SNES, with the Super FX chip bring real-time 3D rendering first used in Star Fox. While the SNES outsold the Genesis in the U.S. in 1992, the Genesis had a larger install base.

The success of Street Fighter II in arcades and on consoles led to the growth of the fighting game genre, and numerous variations from other developers followed. Of significant interest was Midway's Mortal Kombat, released to arcades in 1992. Compared to most other fighting games at the time, Mortal Kombat was much more violent. The game showed combatants' blood splatter during combat and allowed players to end matches in graphically intense "fatalities". Because of its controversial style and gameplay, the game proved extremely popular in arcades.

By 1993, both Nintendo and Sega recognized the need to have Mortal Kombat on their consoles. However, Nintendo, fearing issues with the game's violence, licensed a "clean" version of the game from Acclaim for the SNES. Which included replacing the blood splatter with sweat and removing the aforementioned fatalities. Sega also licensed a censored version of the game for the Genesis. However, players could enter a cheat code that reverted the game back to its original arcade version. Both home versions were released in September, and approximately 6.5 million units were sold over the game's lifetime. But the Genesis version was more popular with three to five times more sales than its SNES counterpart.

External videos
- C-SPAN footage of the first congressional hearing on December 9, 1993.

The popularity of the home console version of Mortal Kombat, coupled with other moral panics in the early 1990s, led to concerns from parents, activists and lawmakers in the United States, leading up to the 1993 congressional hearings on video games first held in December. Led by Senators Joe Lieberman and Herb Kohl, the Senate Committees on Governmental Affairs and the Judiciary brought several of the video game industry leaders, including Howard Lincoln, vice president of Nintendo of America, and Bill White, vice president of Sega of America, to discuss the way they marketed games like Mortal Kombat and Night Trap on consoles to children. Lincoln and White accused each other's companies of creating the issue at hand. Lincoln stated that Nintendo had taken a curated approach to selecting games for their consoles, and that violent games had no place in the market. White responded that Sega purposely was targeting an older audience than Nintendo, and had created a ratings system for its games that it had been trying to encourage the rest of the industry to use; further, despite Nintendo's oversight, White pointed out that there were still many Nintendo titles that incorporated violence. With neither Lincoln nor White giving much play, Lieberman concluded the first hearing with a warning that the industry needs to come together with some means to regulate video games or else Congress would pass laws to do this for them.

By the time of the second hearing in March 1994, the industry had come together to form the Interactive Digital Software Association (today the Entertainment Software Association) and were working to establish the Entertainment Software Rating Board (ESRB), a ratings panel, which ultimately was introduced by September 1994. Despite Sega offering its ratings system as a starting point, Nintendo refused to work with that as they still saw Sega as their rival, requiring a wholly new system to be created. The ESRB eventually established a form modelled off the Motion Picture Association of America (MPAA)'s rating system for film, and the committee was satisfied with the proposed system and allowed the video game industry to continue without further regulations.

=== The arrival of Sony and the end of the war ===
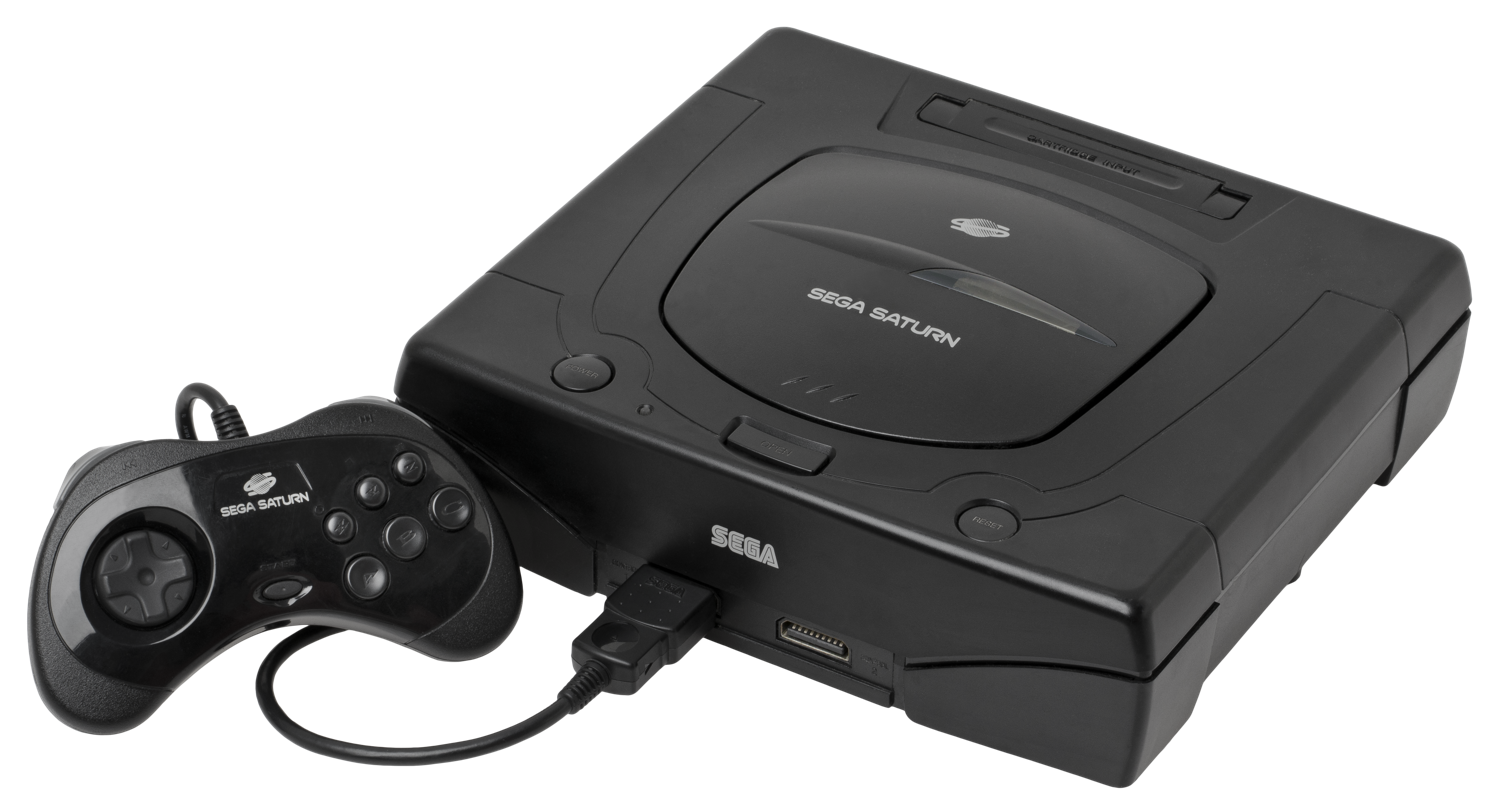
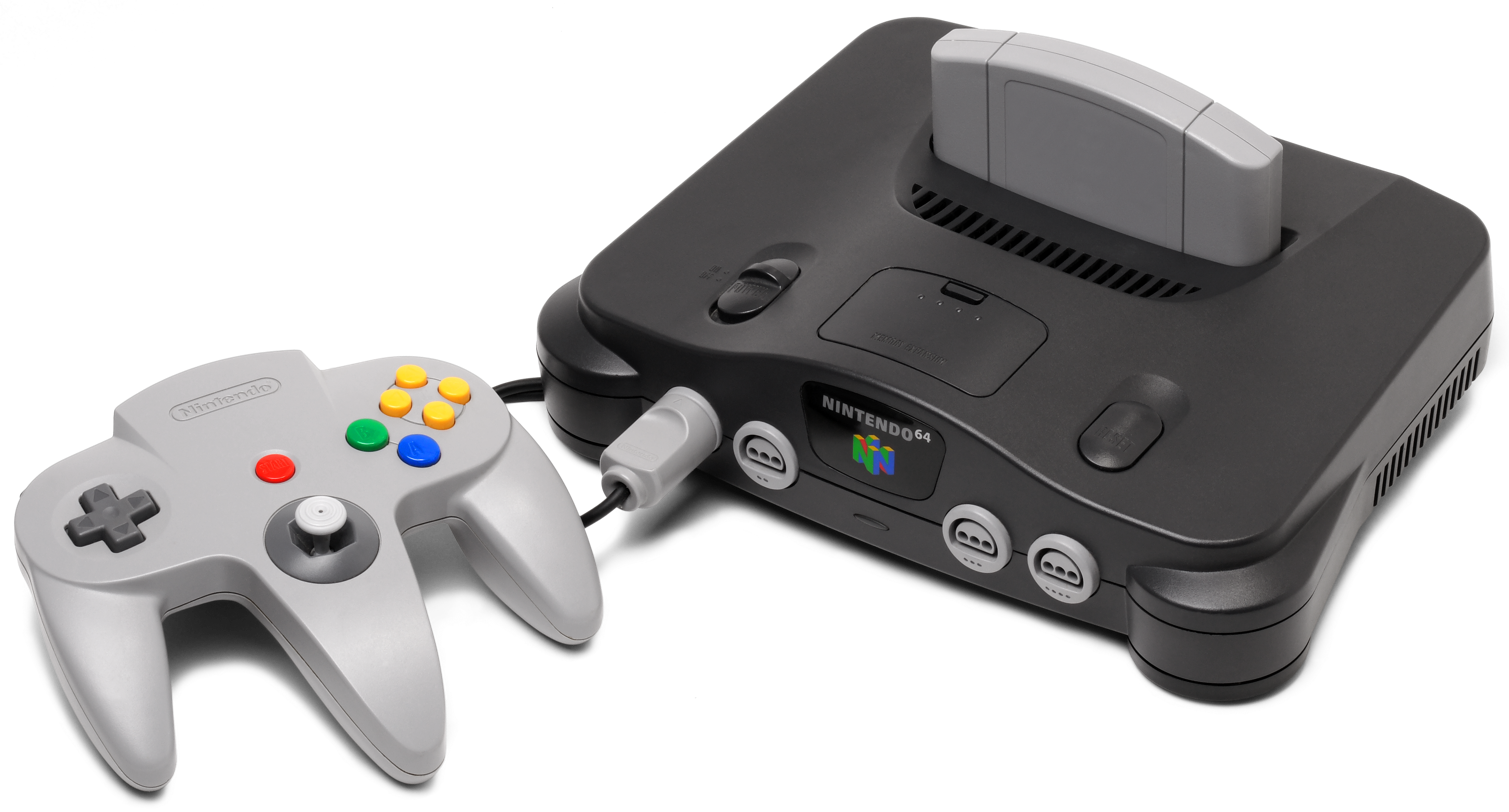
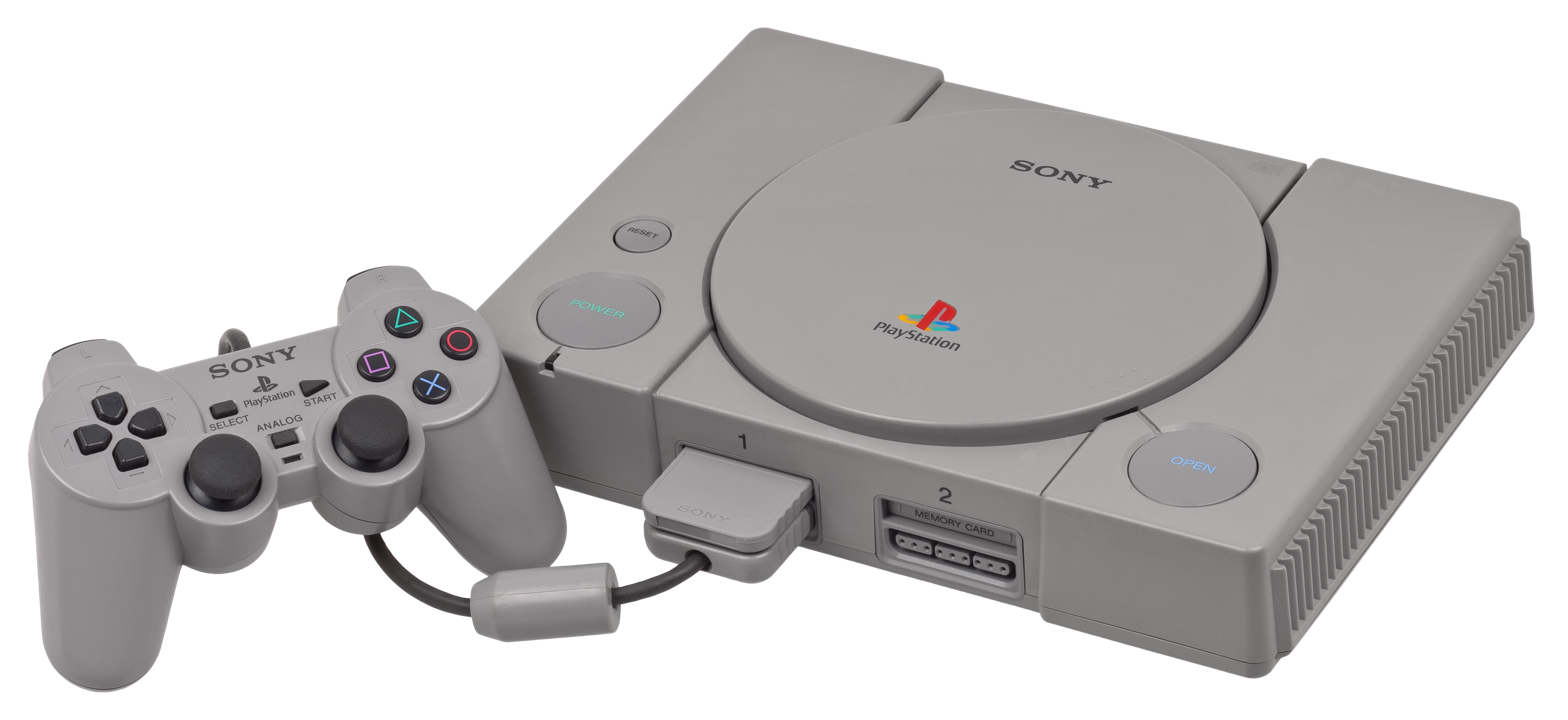
The Sega Saturn (top) and Nintendo 64 (middle) struggled against Sony's newcomer, the PlayStation, which ultimately ended Sega and Nintendo's console war.

In 1994 and 1995, there was a contraction in the video game industry, with NPD Group reporting a 17% and 19% year-to-year drop in revenue. While Sega had been outperforming Nintendo in 1993, it still carried corporate debt while Nintendo remained debt-free from having a more dominant position in the worldwide market, even beating Sega in the North American and US market winning the 16 bit console war. To continue to fight Nintendo, Sega's next console was the Sega Saturn, first released in November 1994 in Japan. It brought in technology used by Sega's arcade games that used 3d polygonal graphics, and launch titles featured home versions of these arcade games including Virtua Fighter. While Virtua Fighter was not a pack-in game, sales of the title were nearly 1:1 with the console in Japan. Sega, recognizing that they had numerous consoles with disparate games they were now trying to support, decided to put most of their attention onto the Saturn line going forward, dropping support for the Genesis despite its sales still being strong in the United States at the time.

At the same time, a new competitor in the console marketplace emerged, Sony Computer Entertainment, with the introduction of the PlayStation in December 1994. The PlayStation moved away from cartridges and took advantage of nascent CD-ROM technology for game distribution, allowing much more data to be stored on each disc and reducing the costs for reproduction. Nintendo had worked with Sony on a prototype add-on for the SNES, the Super NES CD-ROM, that would allow it to read CD-ROMs, but the project was terminated by 1992 after Nintendo revealed it opted to start working with Philips and its own optical disc technology due to Sony securing the rights to both license and retain publishing profits derived from the dual-compatible CD-ROM software on the Super NES CD-ROM, so Sony shifted their development towards the PlayStation. Sega, aware of Sony's potential competition in Japan, made sure to have enough Saturns ready for sale on the day the PlayStation first shipped as to overwhelm Sony's offering.

Both Sega and Sony turned to move these units to the North American market. With the formation of the IDSA, a new North American tradeshow, the Electronic Entertainment Expo (E3) was created in 1995 to focus on video games, to distinguish it from the Consumer Electronics Show (CES), which covered all home electronics. Nintendo, Sega and Sony gave their full support to E3 in 1995. Sega believed they had the stronger position going into E3 over Sony, as gaming publications, comparing the Saturn to the PlayStation, rated the Saturn as the better system. At the first E3 in May 1995, Sega's Kalinske premiered the North American version of the Saturn, announced its various features and its selling price of $399, and said that while it would officially launch that same day, they had already sent a number of systems to selected vendors for sale. Sony's Olaf Olafsson of Sony Electronic Publishing began to cover the PlayStation features, then invited Steve Race, president of Sony Computer Entertainment America to the stage. Race stated the launch price of the PlayStation, "$299", and then left to "thunderous applause". The surprise price cut caught Sega off-guard, and, in addition to several stores pulling Sega from their lineup due to being shunned from early Saturn sales, the higher price point made it more difficult for them to sell the system. As a result of this strategy by Sony, future E3s became a battleground for other console wars, with journalists judging the various hardware manufacturers' presentations to determine which one had the most successful pitches.

When the PlayStation officially launched in the United States in September 1995, its sales over the first two days exceeded what the Saturn had sold over the prior five months. Because Sega had invested heavily on Saturn into the future, Sony's competition drastically hurt the company's finances.

In the case of Nintendo, they bypassed the 32-bit CPU and instead their next offering was the Nintendo 64, a 64-bit CPU console first released in June 1996. While this gave them powerful capabilities such as 3D graphics to keep up and surpass those on the Saturn and PlayStation, it was still a cartridge-based system limiting how much information could be stored for each game. This decision ultimately cost them Square Soft who moved their popular Final Fantasy series over to the PlayStation line to take advantage of the larger space on optical media. The first PlayStation game in the series, Final Fantasy VII, drove sales of the PlayStation, further weakening Nintendo's position and driving Sega further out of the market.

By this point, the console war between Nintendo and Sega had evaporated, with both companies now facing Sony as their rival. Sega made one more console, the Dreamcast, which had a number of innovative features including a built-in modem for online connectivity, but the console's lifespan was short-lived in part due to the success of Sony's next product, the PlayStation 2, currently being the best-selling home console of all time. Sega left the home console hardware business in 2001 to focus on software development and licensing. Nintendo remains a key player in the home console business, but more recently has taken a "blue ocean strategy" approach to avoid competing directly with Sony or Microsoft on a feature-for-feature basis with consoles like the Wii, Nintendo DS, and Nintendo Switch.

=== Legacy ===
The Sega/Nintendo console war is the subject of the non-fiction novel Console Wars by Blake Harris in 2014, as well as a film adaption/documentary of the book in 2020.

Sega and Nintendo have since collaborated on various software titles. Sega has developed a biennial Mario & Sonic at the Olympics series of sports games based on the Summer and Winter Olympics since 2008 featuring characters from both the Super Mario and Sonic series, while Nintendo has developed the Super Smash Bros. crossover fighter series for numerous Nintendo properties that has included Sonic as a playable character along with other Sonic characters in supporting roles since Super Smash Bros. Brawl.

== Sony versus Microsoft ==
=== Background ===
Since the sixth generation, both Sony and Microsoft have been direct competitors for home consoles. Since 2000, both companies have released a new console model within a year of each other with roughly comparable specifications. While Nintendo also has remained a significant competitor to both companies, its development and marketing strategy using the "blue ocean" approach is considered fundamentally different from Sony or Microsoft that it is usually not regarded as major participant in the console war. According to Sony's former president Shuhei Yoshida, Sony did not see Nintendo as a competitor outside of Japan (where Xbox did not have a significant presence) and focused their attention primarily at the Xbox brand; the Xbox was a more comparable high-end system, while Sony had considered that Nintendo was "bringing a young audience into gaming; and some of them when they grow up, might graduate to more mature systems like PlayStation or Xbox."

=== Initial challenge from Microsoft ===
Microsoft specifically entered the console market with the Xbox console in 2001 as it saw Sony's PlayStation 2 as a potential competitor to the home computer as a ubiquitous device in the living room. Whereas the PlayStation 2 was developed from mostly custom components, Microsoft approached the Xbox as a highly refined personal computer based on Microsoft Windows and DirectX technology. The original Xbox did not compete well against the PlayStation 2, selling only about 24 million units worldwide against the PlayStation 2's 160+ million, with Microsoft reportedly failing to profit on the console hardware. Nonetheless, Microsoft, satisfied with the Xbox's overall performance, reaffirmed its commitment to the console marketplace with the reveal of the Xbox 360 in 2005.

=== Xbox 360 vs PlayStation 3 ===
Microsoft was able to take lessons learned from the first Xbox to its second model, the Xbox 360 released in 2005, ahead of Sony's release of the PlayStation 3 in 2006. Besides the earlier release and improved design, Microsoft had secured more first-party developers in its Microsoft Game Studios, mimicking Sony's own first-party developers and other third-party developers for several console exclusives. The PlayStation 3, on the other hand, had fewer exclusives at launch and was hampered by a higher price point at launch, giving the Xbox 360 an edge in the first years of release. Both consoles aimed to include multimedia feature into high-definition movie playback. One miscue Microsoft had was backing the HD-DVD standard for movie playback over the Blu-ray standard that Sony had selected, as shortly after the Xbox 360's release, the movie industry had standardized on Blu-ray. The Xbox 360 also suffered from the "Red Ring of Death", a hardware fault on a large fraction of retail models that cost Microsoft over $1.1 billion in repairs over the console's lifetime.

Both consoles were challenged by Nintendo's Wii and specifically its novel Wiimote motion-sensing device. To compete, both Microsoft and Sony released their motion-sensing systems, the Kinect and PlayStation Move, respectively, for their consoles. The companies also released console refreshes mid-generation. Microsoft released a low-cost Xbox 360 S, which shipped with less internal storage space, as well as a high-end Xbox 360 E, which shipped with more storage space and the Kinect sensor. Sony released two different Slim models of the PlayStation 3 that reduced the system size and subsequent retail price which helped improve sales. Ultimately, the Xbox 360 sold an estimated 84 million units, based on industry estimates as Microsoft stopped reporting its sales, while the PlayStation 3 sold 87 million units; the Wii comparatively sold over 101 million units.

=== Xbox One vs PlayStation 4 ===
Sony and Microsoft both released their next consoles, the PlayStation 4 and the Xbox One, in 2013. Sony considered the difficulties developers had with using the custom instruction set for the Cell processor on the PlayStation 3 and restructured the PlayStation 4 to use the more standard x86 instruction set used by most personal computers helping to bring development in convergence with computer systems. Microsoft initially wanted to drive the Xbox One as a replacement for a cable box in the living room as a single source for entertainment with features aimed around television viewing in addition to gaming. To achieve this, the Xbox One was to be shipped with Kinect and was to use an always-on Internet connection to enable numerous features, such as the ability to share games with other family members. However, when these features were first promoted, there was a heavy backlash from journalists and consumers, considering these unnecessary, privacy-invading features. Microsoft had to pull many of these features from the Xbox One before launch, such as eliminating the always-connected requirement and the need to use Kinect. Sony took the opportunity in their PlayStation 4 marketing to play off Microsoft's missteps, such as demonstrating the simplicity of game sharing by simply passing along the physical media to another person, as well as its lower price point. While Microsoft was able to course-correct the Xbox One after launch, Sony had gained enough ground with the capabilities of the PlayStation 4 along with a strong library of console-exclusive titles, and the PlayStation 4 outsold the Xbox One, 117 million units to 58 million units.

The Xbox One was ultimately the more expensive of the two, however, both console prices were high when compared to the historical console market, setting a trend for ever more expensive consoles.

=== Xbox Series X/S vs PlayStation 5 ===
Both companies released their next consoles in November 2020, the PlayStation 5 and the Xbox Series X and Series S. Both console families represent technology improvements with similar target specifications, including high-resolution and high framerates, high-speed internal storage, and backward compatibility with earlier systems. More recently Microsoft has expanded game offerings beyond consoles, such as Xbox Game Pass and the xCloud game streaming service, as to move away from a console war mentality. Phil Spencer, head of Xbox for Microsoft, stated that they see Xbox in competition with Netflix and other online streaming services vying for entertainment options, rather than Sony. Similarly, Sony launched a more intense focus into streaming services. For example, in 2020, a "media remote" was launched, advertising "effortless control of a wide range of blockbuster entertainment on the PS5".

With Microsoft's acquisition of Zenimax Media in 2021 and acquisition of Activision Blizzard in 2023, the potential for escalation in Sony/Microsoft console war grew, as Microsoft could potentially make Bethesda Softworks and Activision Blizzard's games exclusive to the Xbox line. Microsoft's potential ownership of the Call of Duty series had become a focus of Sony's concerns of the acquisition. While Microsoft has given Sony a written commitment to keep the Call of Duty series on the PlayStation consoles for several years, Sony has expressed concern that this is not adequate and that Microsoft would make the series Xbox-exclusive following that period. As regulatory agencies considered these positions, Microsoft stated that they had been losing the console war against Sony, having always been in a weaker sales position against the PlayStation 5.

Starting in 2024, Microsoft began releasing ports of its first-party games for the PlayStation 5 and Nintendo Switch, which Spencer said was part of Microsoft's plan to focus more on the reach of its games across a wider range of devices and preparing for Microsoft for anticipated changes in game distribution in the industry. Some publications considered this change to be an example of Microsoft conceding to Sony in their console war, deprioritizing console hardware sales in favor of software sales. On 26 August 2025, Helldivers 2, a game originally released in February 2024 as a PlayStation 5 console exclusive by developer Arrowhead Game Studio, launched for Xbox Series X/S consoles. In addition to being the first PlayStation Studios-published title to release on Xbox consoles, the release coincided with the launch of Gears of War: Reloaded on PlayStation 5 the very same day, becoming the first entry in the previously Xbox-exclusive game series to release on a non-Xbox console, and further signaling a de-escalation in the ninth generation console war.

During 2025, among layoffs and price hikes for hardware due to tariffs, Microsoft's strategy appeared to shift towards making its games available across a range of platforms, and backing off its hardware approach. The Xbox Series X and S units were falling well behind sales of the PlayStation 5 as well as the Nintendo Switch 2. Instead, the company took steps towards supporting multiple platforms, with rumors stating the next generation of hardware from Microsoft will support seamless play between console, computer, and cloud gaming.

Both Sony and Microsoft reported losses in their gaming divisions in early 2026. Along with claims that the next Xbox console would likely be a combination of Windows and Xbox, allowing it to play Windows games, Sony opted to no longer publish its single-player in-house games for Windows in a May 2026 statement. Around the same time, Microsoft made a major structuring of the gaming division, with Asha Sharma replacing Phil Spencer, and among her changes was reconsidering their approach to console exclusivity, with in-house games Gears of War: E-Day and Clockwork Revolution revealed in June 2026 to remain console exclusive to the Xbox. These changes in approach were considered to restart the console wars between the two companies.

== Other console wars ==
=== Atari versus Intellivision ===
Following the release of the Atari 2600 in 1977, Mattel sought to enter the console market, and released the Intellivision in 1979. The console was designed for improved graphics and other features compared to the Atari 2600, a factor that dominated the marketing campaign for Intellivision. Intellivision's launch included a number of sports games, using licenses from the major sports leagues, and included an advertising campaign with sports writer George Plimpton. Mattel also focused on hardware accessories to the console like a keyboard for programming. While the Atari 2600 sold an estimated 30 million consoles, the Intellivision sold around 5 million units and was considered the primary competitor to Atari in the second generation of video game consoles.

In the following years, Mattel sought to expand the Intellivision line, releasing the Intellivision II in 1983 and with development of an Intellivision III starting in 1982. Atari released its successor to the 2600, the Atari 5200, in 1982 to compete with the Intellivision. The console war between Atari and Intellivision was shaken up by the arrival of Coleco's ColecoVision in 1982, which was a further technological improvement over both Atari and Intellivision. Both Atari and Mattel suffered significant financial losses in the video game crash of 1983. Atari would scale back its video game efforts in the years that followed, while Mattel sold off the Intellivision brand in 1984.

After decades where the intellectual property from both Atari and Mattel shifted across different agencies, Atari SA acquired the Intellivision brand and rights to over 200 games from its systems in May 2024, which Atari SA jokingly stated to have put an end to the decades-long console war. Atari announced the Intellivision Sprint in October 2025 for release in December 2025, a retro console based on the first Intellivision model with 45 built-in games and other modern updates.

=== 1990s handheld consoles ===
A number of major handheld consoles were released on the market within about a year of each other: Nintendo's Game Boy, Sega's Game Gear, and the Atari Lynx. While the Game Boy used a monochromatic display, both the Game Gear and Lynx had colour displays. As these handheld releases were alongside the Sega v. Nintendo console war, they were also subject to heavy marketing and advertising to try to draw consumers. However, the Game Boy ultimately won out in this battle, selling over 118 million units over its lifetime (including its future revisions) compared to 10 million for the Game Gear and 3 million for the Lynx. The Game Boy initially sold for $50 or more cheaper than its competitors, and had a larger library of games, including what is considered the handheld's killer app, Tetris, that drew non-gamers to purchase the handheld to play it.

=== In video games ===
The Hyperdimension Neptunia series of video games started as a parody of the console wars, incorporating personified consoles, developers, consumers, and other such figures within the gaming industry.

== See also ==
- Browser wars
- Format war
- Smartphone patent wars
