= Tom Kalinske =

American businessman (born 1944)

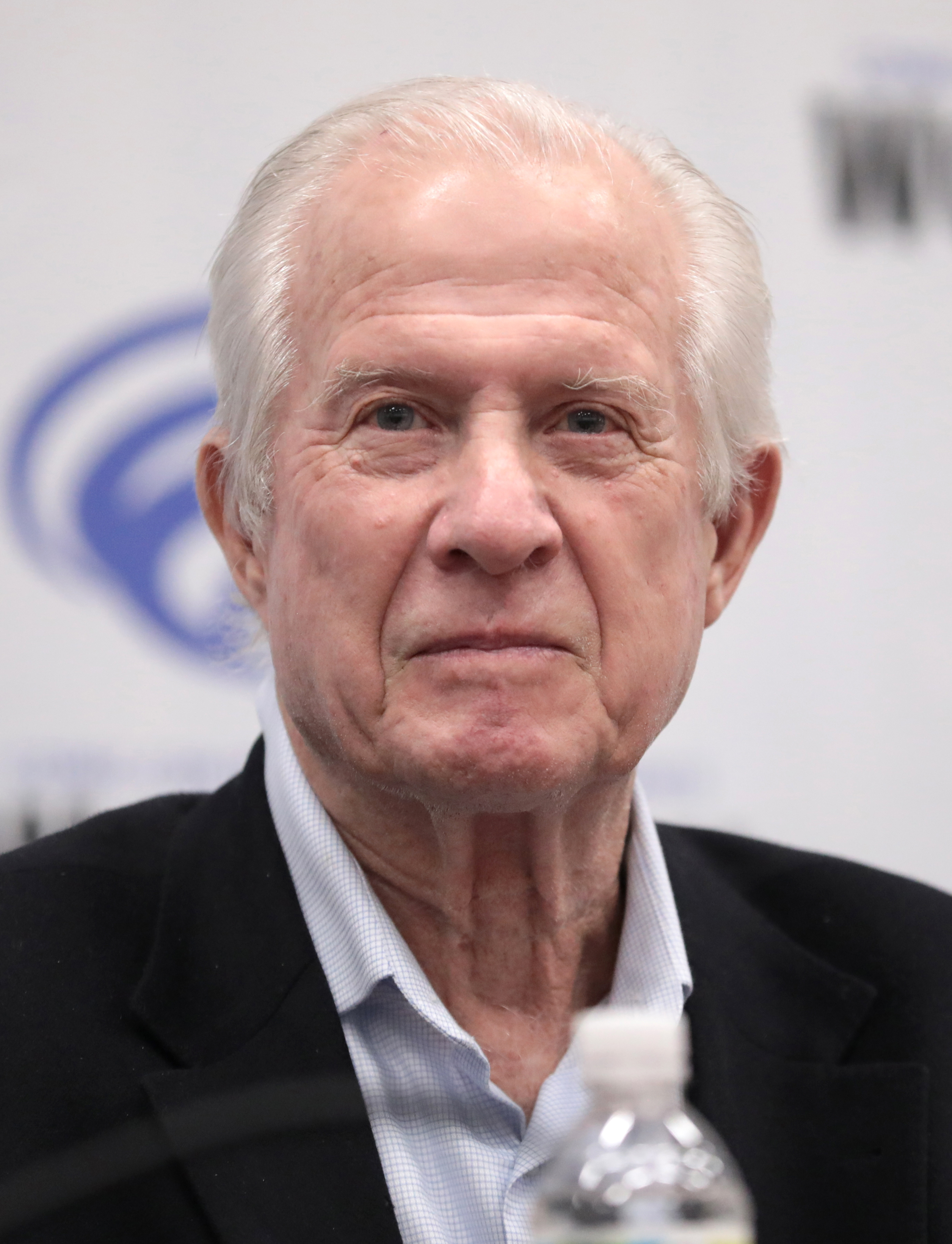
- Kalinske in 2023
- Born: July 17, 1944 (age 82); Iowa, US
- Education: University of Wisconsin (BA); University of Arizona (MBA)
- Occupation: Executive Chairman of Global Education Learning
- Known for: former CEO, Sega of America, Inc.
- Spouse: Karen Kalinske
- Children: 6

Thomas Kalinske (born July 17, 1944) is an American businessman who has worked for Mattel (1972–1987), Matchbox (1987-1990), Sega of America (1990–1996) and LeapFrog (1997–2006).

At Mattel, Kalinske was credited with reviving the Barbie and Hot Wheels brands, launching Masters of the Universe, then being promoted to CEO from 1985 to 1987. He next became CEO of Matchbox, and then was recruited to be the president and CEO of Sega of America from 1990 to 1996, and then CEO and COB of LeapFrog from 1997 to 2006.

His aggressive marketing decisions during his time at Sega, such as price drops, anti-Nintendo attack ads and the famous "Sega Scream" TV campaign, are often cited as key elements in the success of the Sega Genesis. The book Console Wars and the documentary film of the same name chronicles Kalinske's strategies and success in competing with Nintendo.

Kalinske was inducted into the Toy Industry Hall of Fame in 1997 and received a Lifetime Achievement award from People of Play in 2021. He has also been honored as "Man of the Year" by the NY Boy Scouts and LA Make A Wish Foundation.

He is Chairman of Mixed Dimensions, a 3D printing company, and on the boards of Stitched Insights, Adjunct Professor Link, Storyworld, the University of Wisconsin School of Business and Teach The World Foundation. His estimated net worth is $10–$20M.

== Career ==
Thomas Kalinske earned a Bachelor of Science degree at the University of Wisconsin in 1966 and MBA at the University of Arizona in 1968. After college, he served in the United States Army as a tanker and in military intelligence. In 1976, he attended Harvard Business School's Strategic Management Program.

After leaving Mattel in 1987, Kalinske went to work for rival company Matchbox, which had been recently placed into receivership. He implemented plans to cut costs by moving production to more labor-cheap regions in Asia, and by 1990, the company had managed to turn a profit for the first time in years, with a revenue of over $350 million.

While Kalinske was CEO of Sega of America, the company grew from $72 million to more than $1.5 billion and the market value of Sega grew from less than $2 billion to more than $5 billion. His market strategies have been cited as the key factor in breaking Nintendo's dominance of the video game industry, added greatly by a strategic partnership that Kalinske developed with Blockbuster CEO Joe Baczko and Blockbuster's Retail Strategy Officer Mark Allen Stuart. The partnership included the renting of Sega hardware units at a time when in-home penetration of Sega hardware was very low. Providing consumers with the ability to rent the hardware and then rent the video games became a form of marketing, with increased retail sales of both hardware and software as a result. The Sega Genesis and Game Gear systems were highly successful during this time. Later, the commercial failure of the Sega Saturn in the US was exacerbated by Sega's announcement during E3 1995 that the system was available in selected stores effective immediately, instead of on the planned date of September 2, 1995, which had been dubbed "Saturnday". Kalinske was generally against releasing the Saturn early, but was forced to do so by Sega. With few games and consoles in stock, the pre-selected retailers simply were not ready to begin distributing the console, and retailers not provided consoles were so offended by this that they refused to distribute the Saturn at all. Kalinske was not a fan of the Saturn's architecture, and was later quoted saying that he believed no one would be able to successfully market the console. After having tendered his resignation from Sega on July 15, 1996, to take effect on September 30, Isao Okawa, who owned Sega at the time via CSK, reached out to him and invited him to work with the Okawa Foundation. Kalinske remained on Sega's board of directors following his resignation.

Kalinske later became the CEO and chairman of the educational toy company, Leapfrog, which grew to over $600M in revenue, becoming the largest education toy company in the US. He was President of Knowledge Universe, a company that aimed to use technology to improve education. According to Oregon Business in 2011, the company was "the largest single private provider of early childhood education services in the country", with 40,000 employees on three continents and the biggest market share in the United Kingdom, Malaysia and Singapore. Many education companies came out of Knowledge Universe, including LeapFrog, K-12, Knowledge Beginnings (the largest chain of preschools in the US), Spring and Vistage (Executive Education).

Kalinske was on the board of directors of the Toy Manufacturers of America for twelve years. He was on the board of Blackboard between 2005 and 2012. He is on the board of Cambium Learning Group, the board of Genyous (a cancer drug development company) and the board of WCEPS (Wisconsin Center for Educational Products & Services). He is emeritus advisor to the UW Business School and University of Arizona Eller School of Management, and is vice chairman of LeapFrog Inc.

== Legacy ==
Blake J. Harris's book Console Wars, released in May 2014, is a retelling of Tom Kalinske's efforts to overthrow Nintendo. The story is formulated in a third person narrative, which was assembled based on more than two hundred interviews carried out by the author with former Sega and Nintendo employees. A documentary based on the book was released on September 23, 2020.

For his work at Mattel, Universal Matchbox, Sega and Leapfrog, Kalinske was a 1997 inductee into the Toy Industry Hall of Fame. He has received the NYC Boy Scout's Good Scout Award, the Starlight Foundation Man of Year Award, the University of Wisconsin Business Partners "Distinguished low" Award and the Video Software Dealers Man of Year Award.
