= Video games in Italy =

Video games in Italy are a popular consumer product, making the country a large market for foreign distributors. The establishment of a domestic industry was long hampered by a lack of intellectual property protections. Strong consumer protection laws continue to limit the activities of industry actors. Video games in Italy are increasingly used as a tool for the preservation of the country’s cultural heritage. However, the increase of time spent playing video games during the COVID-19 pandemic also prompted concerns regarding potential adverse health effects of excessive video gaming on adolescents in the country.

== History ==
Arcade video games arrived in Italy in the late 1970s. The commercialization of home video games in Italy began in 1983 with the launch of the Commodore 64 microcomputer, which was sold at an affordable price on the Italian market. The publication of magazines and books relating to the set up and usage of home computers, such as the 1983 book Il mio primo libro sui computer (My first computer book) quickly popularized the new technology amongst young adults.

Up until the early 1990s, the distribution of video games in Italy was significantly driven by piracy. This included both copying games with only minor adjustments, and unauthorized linguistic adaptation of foreign games. In the legal gray zone created by an outdated intellectual property law from 1941, pirated games were sold in bundles at newsstands by magazines such as Special Program, which contained 10 cassettes with pirated games per issue.

The dominant role held by piracy in the distribution of video games in Italy also adversely impacted the development of the domestic video game industry. The early sector was characterized by small-scale businesses, often run by students and young adults. The few companies that managed to establish themselves on the domestic market despite its unregulated structure were unable to keep up with foreign enterprises in countries like Japan and the United States, such that most went out of business by the early 1990s.

The introduction of Law 547 in 1993 finally improved the protection of intellectual property in the realm of computer games in Italy.

== Demographics ==
According to the Italian Interactive Digital Entertainment Association (IIDEA), in 2024, Italy had an estimated 14 million video gamers, representing about 33% of the population. Italy’s gaming population is primarily adult. The IIDEA reported that the age demographic of Italian players ranges from ages 6 to 64, with an average age of about 31 years. The IIDEA further reports that 84% of players are between the ages of 18 and 64. 16% of Italian players are under the age of 18, with a higher concentration of players in the age groups ranging between 15-24 and 45-64.

The IIDEA reports a gender distribution of 59% male players (8.2 million) and 41% female players (5.7 million). This represents an increase of female gamers by 16%, with male gamers increasing by 2.5% per year.

== Market Statistics ==
Italy is the fifth largest market for video games in the EMEA (Europe, Middle East, Africa) region, behind Spain, Germany, France, and the UK. In 2009, Italy’s video game revenue totaled $1.4 billion.

In 2024, overall consumer spending in Italy’s video game market reached nearly $2.7 billion. The software sales accounted for 76.8% ($2.07 billion) of that total revenue, while hardware represented about 23.2% ($632 million). In comparison to the year before, hardware sales decreased by 18%, while software sales increased by 11%.

=== By Platform ===
From 2004 to 2008, Italy’s mobile gaming market size grew from $22.9 million to $134.8 million, including a 34% increase between 2007 and 2008 alone (from $100.9 million to $134.8 million respectively).

10.4 million Italian users played via mobile devices in 2024, representing a 13% increase from 2023. Additional data from the IIDEA indicates that mobile gaming is the most commonly used platform (74.1%), followed by console (44.2%), and PC (34.4%) gaming.

== Regulatory Framework ==
Italy’s gaming industry is challenged by growing concerns of consumer safety and regulations regarding the digital market. A shift in player algorithm and game development, especially during the COVID-19 pandemic, led to an increase of controversial gaming practices such as the implementation of loot boxes and micro transactions. Italian Legislative Decree 206/2005, which enforces consumer transparency and protects fair competition and practices, is violated by the lack of adequate information regarding renewals, subscriptions, and refunds. Other practices such as “dark patterns”, manipulate consumer decisions and promote risky purchases that consumers otherwise would not have made. Loot boxes also violate consumer transparency as the contents of the purchase is not revealed until after the purchase is made. Critics have argued against the implementation of loot boxes in video game design, warning of the risks of addiction towards minors and the younger audience. Italy’s Legislative Decree 496/1948 defines loot boxes under “gambling”, which further hinders Italy’s outreach in the digital market. Under this law, offering any type of reward is also prohibited, affecting Italy’s ability to hold any type of Esports tournament. As some esports tournaments require money to enter, competitive video gaming is regulated by this law as gambling. Because of this, any organization of any esports event must be authorized from the state to prevent legal repercussions.

As esports events gain more popularity worldwide, Italy’s gaming industry have also turned their attention to the competitive video game stage. However, there is a slow movement due to lack of investors in the Italian Esports ecosystem and additional legal roadblocks. Copyright infringement and right of intellectual property by game developers have limited the number of games open to the esports arena. Presidential Decree no. 430/2001 is one legislation that regulates prize competition. 430/2001 affects how competitive stages are set and organized, as well as prohibiting cash prizes if there is a lack of a promotional purpose, whether it be to promote products or advertise for certain brands. Because of this, 430/2001 also bans direct and indirect advertising on any type of gambling activity and any game that incorporates a cash prize. As many esports events reward cash prizes, 430/2001 limits Italy’s esports community's ability to grow and expand to larger digital markets.

== Cultural Impact ==
=== Cultural Heritage Preservation ===
In Italy, video games are actively used as a cultural heritage communication and promotion tool. Among the top 500 Italian museums, 80 gaming initiatives involving 63 cultural institutions have been identified – 49 titles located in Northern Italy, 16 in Central Italy, and 13 in South Italy. These initiatives include the use of video games, gamified visit experiences and playful learning projects to better engage visitors.

Gamification continues to grow in importance for promoting historical museum collections and Italian cultural sites. Many Italian cultural institutions use video games as a strategic digital marketing tool to promote cultural heritage and tourism on top of the conventional “learning by playing” function. As inspiration drawn from local heritages fuels creativity and innovation in the new European game scene, game developers are becoming increasingly dedicated towards embracing cultural heritages.

=== Tourism ===
Video games generate significant tourist demand in Italy. In particular, the popular video game series Assassin’s Creed has multiple games set in Italy (Assassin's Creed II – set in Renaissance Italy, primarily Florence and Venice; Assassin's Creed: Brotherhood – set in Monteriggioni and Rome; Assassin's Creed Identity – features reconstructions of landmarks from 15th century Florence, Rome, and Monteriggioni). As video game players virtually visit cities, villages and other sites of Italy, players learn about these places from playing the game and become interested in visiting them in real life.

== Controversies ==
=== Risks ===
Regular exposure to violent video games increases the risk of developing aggressive behaviors in adolescents. An Italian study shows that the consumption of video games leads to sadistic and rebellious behavior in minors, and weakens their empathy and prosocial skills. Those who play violent video games have greater issues with externalization, aggression, and avoidant coping strategies compared to those who do not. As younger age groups tend to spend more time playing video games, this increases their risk of developing Gaming Disorder.

=== Gaming Disorder (GD) ===
Gaming Disorder (GD) refers to persistent gaming behavior characterized by loss of control, daily predominance of gaming over other activities in life, and the continuation of playing despite negative repercussions. Among Italian young adults, Internet Gaming Disorder (IGD) is noted to be a direct cause of psychopathological distress. Greater use of video games leads to higher levels of depression, anxiety, psychoticism, and poorer familial relationships. GD is officially recognized as a formal psychological disorder associated with playing video games by the World Health Organization (WHO), and it is listed as a formal diagnostic entity in the 11th edition of the International Classification of Diseases (ICD-11), under the chapter on addictive disorders in mental health.

== See also ==
- Science and technology in Italy
