= 2020 in esports =

List of esports events in 2020 (also known as professional gaming). Several events have been cancelled due to the COVID-19 pandemic, and some organizers opted to continue running tournaments remotely through the internet.

== Calendar of events ==
=== Tournaments ===
Date	Game	Event	Location	Winner(s)
January 24 – 26	Counter-Strike: Global Offensive	DreamHack Open Leipzig 2020	Leipzig Messe − Leipzig, Germany	BIG
February 8 – 9	Call of Duty: Modern Warfare	CDL London Homestand	Copper Box Arena − London, United Kingdom	Chicago Huntsmen
February 14 – 16	Rainbow Six Siege	Six Invitational	Place Bell − Montreal, Canada	SpaceStation Gaming
February 21 – 23	Counter-Strike: Global Offensive	DreamHack Open Anaheim 2020	Anaheim Convention Center − California, United States	Gen.G
February 22 – 23	Call of Duty: Modern Warfare	CDL Atlanta Homestand	Gateway Center Arena − Georgia, United States	Atlanta Faze
March 20 – 22	iRacing	eNASCAR Pro Invitational Series Dixie Vodka 150	Remote venues	Denny Hamlin
May 28 – 31	League of Legends	Mid-Season Cup 2020	Online	Top Esports
June 13 – 14	rFactor 2	24 Hours of Le Mans Virtual	Remote venues	Rebellion Williams Esports _{(Louis Deletraz; Raffaele Marciello; Nikodem Wisniewski; Kuba Brzezinski)}
August 7 – 9	Counter-Strike: Global Offensive	DreamHack Open Summer 2020 Oceania	Online	Renegades
August 8 – 16	Counter-Strike: Global Offensive	DreamHack Open Summer 2020 Europe	Online	BIG
August 8 – 16	Counter-Strike: Global Offensive	DreamHack Open Summer 2020 North America	Online	FURIA
August 14 – 16	Counter-Strike: Global Offensive	DreamHack Open Summer 2020 Asia	Online	TYLOO
August 15 – November 1	Clash Royale	Clash Royale League 2020 East Fall Season	Online	Nova Esports
September 19 – November 21	Clash Royale	Clash Royale League 2020 West Fall Season	Online	Team Queso
September 25 – October 31	League of Legends	2020 League of Legends World Championship	Shanghai Media Tech Studio - Shanghai, China Pudong Football Stadium - Shanghai, China (final only)	Damwon Gaming
October 10	Overwatch	2020 Overwatch League Grand Finals	Online	San Francisco Shock
October 15 – 25	Counter-Strike: Global Offensive	DreamHack Open Fall 2020	Online	HEROIC
November 21 – 22	Brawl Stars	Brawl Stars World Finals 2020	Online	PSG Esports
November 26 – 29	Counter-Strike: Global Offensive	DreamHack Open November 2020	Online	Gambit
December 5 – 6	Clash Royale	Clash Royale League 2020 World Finals	Online (Other team) Baoshan Sports Centre - Shanghai, China (China's team)	Team Queso
December 10 – 13	Counter-Strike: Global Offensive	DreamHack Open December 2020	Online	Virtus.pro
