= Console Wars (book) =

2014 book by Blake J. Harris

- Book cover
- Author: Blake J. Harris
- Subject: History of video games
- Published: 2014 (HarperCollins)
- Pages: 558

Console Wars: Sega, Nintendo, and the Battle That Defined a Generation is a 2014 non-fiction novel written by Blake J. Harris. It follows businessman Tom Kalinske in his venture as CEO of video game company Sega of America from 1990 to 1996, and details the history of the fierce business competition between Sega and Nintendo throughout the 1990s as well as the internal conflicts that took place between Sega of America and its Japanese parent company, Sega Enterprise. Harris wrote the book in the style of a novel by compiling several interviews with people who were involved with the events, using the information gathered to create a dramatic interpretation of the events. A documentary of the book directed by Harris and Jonah Tulis was released on CBS All Access on September 23, 2020. A miniseries adaptation is in development with Seth Rogen and Evan Goldberg executive producing with Jordan Vogt-Roberts directing.

== Synopsis ==
A few years after stepping down as CEO of Mattel, Tom Kalinske is on vacation with his family in Hawaii when he is visited by an old friend, Hayao Nakayama, who offers Kalinske a job as CEO of the American division of a small video game company called Sega. Despite being initially reluctant to take the job as he knows nothing about video games, Kalinske agrees to fly out to Japan, where Nakayama shows him several products being developed by Sega, including their handheld portable system, the Game Gear, and their 16-bit home console, the Sega Genesis. Kalinske is enthralled, especially when he spots a man playing a Game Boy while drinking at a geisha club.

However, when Kalinske arrives for his first day as CEO, he finds Sega of America to be in complete disarray: his predecessor, Michael Katz, has driven the firm to near-bankruptcy by overspending on unpopular titles like James 'Buster' Douglas Knockout Boxing, the company is unable to source third-party games due to Nintendo having exclusive contracts with most developers, and the staff is rife with infighting and finger-pointing. The Genesis, hampered by poor marketing and a shoddy game library, has sold fewer than 500,000 units, only half of the sales needed to keep Sega of America afloat. Taking charge, Kalinske assembles a new leadership team and decides to adopt the "Gillette model", demanding complete control over marketing for the Genesis, which includes replacing the game originally bundled with the Genesis, Altered Beast, with a new, little-known title, Sonic the Hedgehog. Sega's Japanese executives politely refuse to authorize his plans, but Nakayama overrules them and gives Kalinske the green light. Following a successful demonstration of Sonic at the 1991 Summer Consumer Electronics Show, the newly released Super NES was unable to outsell the Genesis throughout 1991, marking the first time since 1985 that the Nintendo does not dominate the home console market.

Bolstered with confidence, Kalinske and Sega decide to further establish their newfound dominance by promoting the Genesis (and by extension, Sega), as a cool, edgier alternative to the "family-friendly" games of Nintendo, targeting teenage gamers and adults. For example, when Nintendo decides to release a censored version of Mortal Kombat following a public outcry over the game's violent content, Sega of America puts out its own version on the Genesis with a special "blood code" that bypasses such restrictions. In response to criticism that the decision is tasteless, Kalinske decides to create the industry's first "ratings system" for Sega's games, which eventually evolves into the Entertainment Software Ratings Board.

Despite all this success, cracks begin to appear in Sega of America's fortunes. Kalinske works on a deal with Sony to collaborate on a new console that Nintendo had abandoned, but his superiors in Japan, believing the project to be wasteful, cancel it; the console is eventually released by Sony as the "PlayStation" to instant success. Sega of Japan begins producing a new 32-bit console, the Sega Saturn, and gradually discontinues support for the Genesis despite Kalinske's protests that the latter is still commercially viable; this, coupled with distribution and logistical issues as well as the Saturn's disappointing selection of games, lack of a Sonic title, and unpolished design, make it a commercial failure. Kalinske and his team find that Sega of Japan is increasingly shutting them out of company decisions.

Aware that Nintendo's latest project, the Nintendo 64, will effectively render the Saturn obsolete, Kalinske and several other staffers decide to resign from Sega of America, with Kalinske shifting his focus towards producing educational games for children. The book ends with Kalinske and his family once again vacationing in Hawaii, only to discover a note from then-chairman of Nintendo of America Howard Lincoln upon returning home, expressing his sadness towards Kalinske's departure from Sega while acknowledging him as a driving force in the video game industry. Sega quickly discontinues the Saturn and in 1999 releases the Sega Dreamcast, a console with advanced features such as Internet connectivity, but it becomes clear that the company is losing money on consoles. By 2001, Sega has transitioned to a third-party developer making games for their former rivals, Nintendo and Sony, and their replacement in the console market, Microsoft.

== Critical reception ==
Reviewing for The A.V. Club, John Teti gave the book a "C" grade, criticizing the sections of dialogue: "Harris’ acts of embroidery drag Console Wars down", but also stating that "the innovation and corporate skulduggery of the Sega-Nintendo clash is so entertaining that Harris’ functional prose still tells a lively tale". Frank Cifaldi of Kotaku had similar critiques but praised the level of research that went into the book.

The New York Times, The Daily Telegraph, and The Independent all gave negative reviews, citing the dialogue as the fatal flaw. Chris Suellentrop for The New York Times observed that "the reconstructed dialogue can be stilted and phony".

A positive review came from Wired, with Chris Kohler writing "Console Wars slots in nicely to the previously existing library of history books covering the game industry".

== Documentary ==
In 2016 the producers of BBC's The Gamechangers secured the rights from Sony Pictures to develop a television documentary film inspired by the book, as part of a series of documentary films based on video game culture. In 2019, the project moved to Paramount+. It was to premiere at the SXSW event in March 2020, but due to the COVID-19 pandemic, the SXSW event was cancelled. The documentary complements the dramatized adaptation that was also announced. The documentary was released on Paramount+ on September 23, 2020.

== Television drama series ==
Harris had support from Seth Rogen and Evan Goldberg while writing the book, both of whom contributed to the book's foreword. In 2014, Rogen stated he was interested in turning the book into a movie under Sony Pictures, and had already secured the rights from Harris. By November 2018, this project had transitioned to become a limited television series to be produced by Legendary Television with both Rogen and Goldberg serving as executive producers from their production company, Point Grey Pictures. Jordan Vogt-Roberts was slated to direct. The series was picked up by CBS to be streamed via their Paramount+ service alongside the aforementioned documentary, that was also executive produced by Rogen and Goldberg.
