= Console Wars (film) =

2020 documentary

- Directed by: Jonah Tulis; Blake J. Harris
- Based on: Console Wars: Sega, Nintendo, and the Battle That Defined a Generation by Blake J. Harris
- Produced by: Jonah Tulis; Blake J. Harris; Seth Rogen; Evan Goldberg
- Music by: Jeff Beal
- Production companies: CBS Television Studios; Legendary Television; Point Grey Pictures
- Distributed by: Paramount+ CBS All Access
- Release date: September 23, 2020
- Running time: 92 minutes
- Country: United States

Console Wars is a 2020 documentary film directed by Jonah Tulis and Blake J. Harris, exploring the 1990s console wars between Nintendo and Sega and Sega's rise and fall in the home console market. Based on Harris's 2014 book Console Wars, it was the first original film for CBS All Access, which became Paramount+.

== Premise ==
Console Wars examines the late 1980s and early 1990s rivalry between gaming giants Sega and Nintendo. The documentary highlights Sega's strategies to challenge Nintendo and its eventual decline by decade's end.

== Development ==
In 2010, Blake J. Harris received a retro Sega Genesis console, sparking nostalgia and curiosity about the console wars. Noting the lack of media attention on the topic, he began researching. In 2012, Harris and his business partner, Jonah Tulis, met with producers and game enthusiasts Seth Rogen and Evan Goldberg, who supported publishing a book and producing a documentary. Producer Scott Rudin secured financing through a book auction with HarperCollins and helped Sony acquire documentary rights.

The 2014 Sony Pictures hack, linked to North Korea and possibly triggered by Seth Rogen's film The Interview, leaked Sony's plans for many of their upcoming projects, threatening the documentary's progress. Sony transferred the rights to Legendary studios in 2018, and the documentary premiered on CBS All Access in 2020.

Harris used a VHD-to-DVD converter to obtain archival footage depicting the Nintendo-Sega rivalry.

== Reception ==
On the review aggregator website Rotten Tomatoes, 85% of 13 critics' reviews are positive. Critics noted the documentary's late introduction of Nintendo and its heavy focus on Sega, describing it as intriguing but unfocused. Others praised the interviews for capturing the unique spirit of Sega America's employees. The film was described as a nostalgic David and Goliath story.

== See also ==
- GameStop: Rise of the Players
