= Uncharted (disambiguation) =

Uncharted may refer to:

- Uncharted, an action-adventure video game series, and media franchise
  - Uncharted: Drake's Fortune, the first game in the series
  - Uncharted 2: Among Thieves, the second game in the series
  - Uncharted 3: Drake's Deception, the third game in the series
  - Uncharted 4: A Thief's End, the fourth game in the series
  - Uncharted: Golden Abyss
  - Uncharted: Fight for Fortune
  - Uncharted: The Lost Legacy
  - Uncharted Live Action Fan Film, a 2018 short film starring Nathan Fillion
  - Uncharted (film), a 2022 action-adventure film based on the video game series
- Uncharted, a Baen alternate history by Sarah A. Hoyt and Kevin J. Anderson
- Uncharted, a music chart published by Billboard between 2011 and 2014
- "Uncharted" (song), a song by Sara Bareilles
- Uncharted (album), the sixth studio album by The Piano Guys
- Uncharted, a retail chain owned and operated by The Paper Store
- Gordon Ramsay: Uncharted, a travel and food television series starring celebrity chef Gordon Ramsay
- Uncharted with Hannah Fry, a 2023 BBC Radio series
- Subaru Uncharted, an electric crossover SUV

== See also ==
- Uncharted Channels, 1920 American silent drama film directed by Henry King
- Chart (disambiguation)
