= Uncharted: Fortune Hunter =

2016 video game

- Developer: PlayStation Mobile Inc.
- Publisher: Sony Computer Entertainment
- Series: Uncharted
- Platforms: Android, iOS
- Release: May 5, 2016
- Genre: Puzzle
- Mode: Single-player

Uncharted: Fortune Hunter is a free-to-play puzzle game developed by PlayStation Mobile Inc. in collaboration with Naughty Dog, and published by Sony Computer Entertainment. Released on May 5, 2016, for Android and iOS, the game is a spin-off of the Uncharted franchise and served as a companion app to Uncharted 4: A Thief's End.

== Gameplay ==
Uncharted: Fortune Hunter featured stylized puzzle gameplay in which players controlled series protagonist Nathan Drake across a grid-based board. The objective was to solve over 200 logic puzzles by navigating traps, activating switches, and collecting treasures. The game combined classic puzzle mechanics with the aesthetic and tone of the Uncharted series.

By linking a PlayStation Network account, players could unlock rewards for Uncharted 4: A Thief's End's multiplayer mode, including character skins, relics, and boosters.

== Development and release ==
The game was developed by PlayStation Mobile Inc., with input from Naughty Dog, and released globally on May 5, 2016, for Android and iOS devices. It was designed to coincide with the launch of Uncharted 4: A Thief's End, offering complementary gameplay and unlockable content for console players.

In March 2022, Naughty Dog announced that Uncharted: Fortune Hunter had been officially discontinued. The app was removed from the App Store and Google Play, and in-app purchases were disabled. Players who had previously downloaded the game could continue to use it in offline mode.

== Reception ==
Uncharted: Fortune Hunter received generally positive reviews. The iOS version held a score of 77 out of 100 on Metacritic, based on several critic reviews. Reviewers praised the puzzle mechanics and visuals, though noted limited long-term replayability. Pocket Gamer described it as "an enjoyable distraction" for fans of the franchise.

Despite its connection to a popular console title, the game saw limited commercial performance. Reports indicated it generated approximately $88,000 in revenue from 1.9 million downloads. Although it did not achieve major commercial success, Uncharted: Fortune Hunter was notable as the franchise's only dedicated mobile puzzle title. It represented part of Sony's broader transmedia strategy to expand the Uncharted brand beyond console gaming.
