= Josh Scherr =

American video game writer and designer

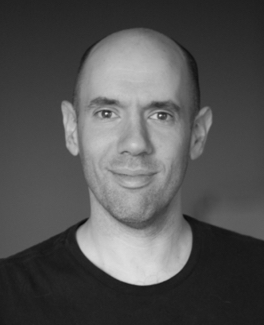
- Education: USC School of Cinematic Arts
- Occupations: Writer; video game designer
- Employers: Naughty Dog (2001–22); Crop Circle Games (2022–24); Cautionary Tales (2024–present)
- Notable work: Uncharted 2: Among Thieves, Uncharted 4: A Thief's End, Uncharted: The Lost Legacy

Josh Scherr is an American video game writer and designer best known for his work on the Uncharted series.

== Education ==
Josh Scherr received his Master of Fine Arts in Animation from the USC School of Cinematic Arts in 1997.

== Career ==
He worked on several films, including Los Gringos (1999) and Dinosaur (2000), before joining Naughty Dog in 2001. He worked as the cinematics animation lead on the Jak and Daxter series (2001–05), and also led the cinematics team for the first three Uncharted games from 2007 to 2011. He supervised and co-wrote the Uncharted comic book, released from 2011 to 2012. He has been a staff writer for Naughty Dog since early 2014, co-writing Uncharted 4: A Thief's End (2016) with Neil Druckmann, and Uncharted: The Lost Legacy (2017) with Shaun Escayg. On July 15, 2022, Scherr announced his departure from Naughty Dog after 21 years with the company. In October 2022, he announced he had joined new studio Crop Circle Games as narrative director; the studio was shuttered in March 2024. Under the name Cautionary Tales, Scherr provides writing and consultant work for games; his first credit was for Sleep Awake (2025), for which he honed the character development and narrative arcs.

== Works ==
=== Video games ===
Year	Game title	Role
2001	Jak and Daxter: The Precursor Legacy	Cinematic animator
2003	Jak II	Lead cinematic animator
2004	Jak 3	Lead cinematic animator
2005	Jak X: Combat Racing	Lead cinematic animator
2006	Daxter	Additional cut-scene animator
2007	Uncharted: Drake's Fortune	Co-writer, lead cinematic animator
2009	Uncharted 2: Among Thieves	Co-writer, lead cinematic animator
2011	Uncharted 3: Drake's Deception	Lead cinematic animator
2016	Uncharted 4: A Thief's End	Co-writer
2017	Uncharted: The Lost Legacy	Co-writer
2020	The Last of Us Part II	Narrative designer, additional writing
2025	Sleep Awake	Narrative design consulting, additional writing

=== Other ===
Year	Game title	Role	Notes
1999	Los Gringos	Animator	Short film
2000	Dinosaur	Animator	Film
2000	"Californication"	Animator	Music video
