= Nathan Drake =

Protagonist of the Uncharted series

- Uncharted character
- Drake as he appears in A Thief's End
- First appearance: Uncharted: Drake's Fortune (2007)
- Last appearance: Uncharted 4: A Thief's End (2016, games)
- Created by: Amy Hennig
- Portrayed by: Nolan North (games); Tom Holland (2022 film); Other performers: Billy Unger (games; teen); Britain Dalton (games; child); Tiernan Jones (film; child)
- Voiced by: Other languages: Bruno Choël (French); Roberto Encinas (Spanish); Leandro "Leto" Dugatkin (Latin American Spanish); Matteo Zanotti (Italian); Hiroki Tōchi (Japanese); Jarosław Boberek (Polish); Denis Bespaly (Russian); Jens Wendland (German); Rafael Tombini (Brazilian Portuguese); Sérgio Calvinho (Portuguese); Okan Yalabık (Turkish)

In-universe information
- Full name: Nathan Morgan
- Nickname: Nate
- Family: Cassandra Morgan (mother); Sam Drake (brother)
- Spouse: Elena Fisher
- Children: Cassie Drake
- Nationality: American

Nathan Drake (né Morgan) is a character and the protagonist of the Uncharted franchise, most notably in the video game series, developed by Naughty Dog. He appears in all mainline games: Uncharted: Drake's Fortune, Uncharted 2: Among Thieves, Uncharted 3: Drake's Deception, and Uncharted 4: A Thief's End, the spin-offs Uncharted: Golden Abyss and Uncharted: Fight for Fortune, the motion comic prequel series Uncharted: Eye of Indra by DC Comics, and other related media. A charismatic and good-natured yet rebellious treasure hunter, the player controls Drake as he journeys across the world to uncover various historical mysteries. He is played through voice and motion capture by Nolan North, who influenced Drake's personality by ad-libbing segments of the character's dialogue.

Naughty Dog based Drake's appearance on the heroes of pulp magazines, novels and films. To make him relatable, the character was dressed in jeans and a long-sleeved Henley, and given an everyman persona; he is strong willed, and often jokes and quips. The designers focused on giving him realistic reactions to his environment; for example, he stumbles while running, barely clears objects during leaps, and recognizes the absurdity of the situations in which he finds himself.

The design and personality of Drake have drawn comparisons to other video game and film characters, such as Lara Croft and Indiana Jones. Many reviewers have called Drake a likable and believable character, and noted that he is a rare example of a physically attractive character who is not hypermasculine.

== Character design ==
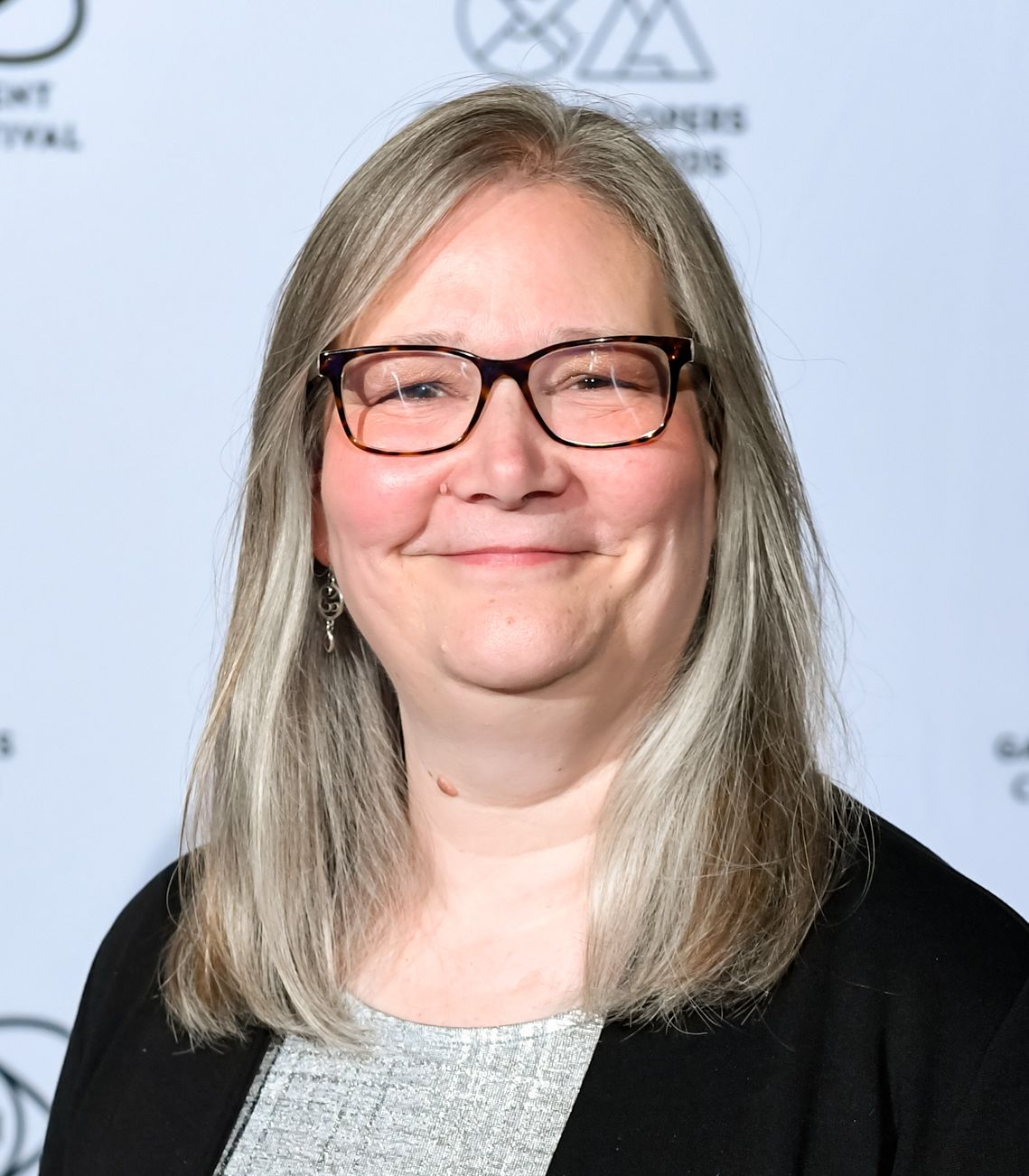
Amy Hennig created Nathan Drake.

Illustrator and designer Kory Heinzen worked on pre-visualization, concept and character design on the video game Uncharted: Drake's Fortune, developed by Naughty Dog. Heinzen's initial concept differed from the finished character. The production staff drew inspiration from the pulp adventure genre when creating the video games in the Uncharted series, and based Drake on the stereotypical characters of adventure films and novels, giving him wit, resourcefulness, and strong principles. Naughty Dog wanted to highlight Drake's personality through his interactions with the environment during gameplay. To do this, they developed a wide range of animations for Drake, allowing him to display reactions and his snarky disposition in context. These animations were designed to be fluid and believable; they removed any animation that did not promote this fluidity or took a large amount of time to execute. The blended animation system in the game, with more than 30 animations comprising one movement, was implemented to make Drake a more relatable character.

Series writer Amy Hennig described Drake as a gritty, charming mixture of actors Harrison Ford and Bruce Willis, with additional influence coming from romantic action-adventure heroes, including Cary Grant:

... we even went back to the earliest movie serials, movies from the '30s and the '50s, and the more recent revivals of the action-adventure genre in the '80s, and even recently with movies like National Treasure. There are certain traits that a lot of those characters have in common – that irreverent, roguish sense of humor, that charm.

Lemarchand listed comic characters Doc Savage and Tintin, as well as Die Hard protagonist John McClane, as inspirations for the character. Drake's physical prowess was modeled on that of Savage, and his personality inspired by the vibrant color and globetrotting identity of Tintin.

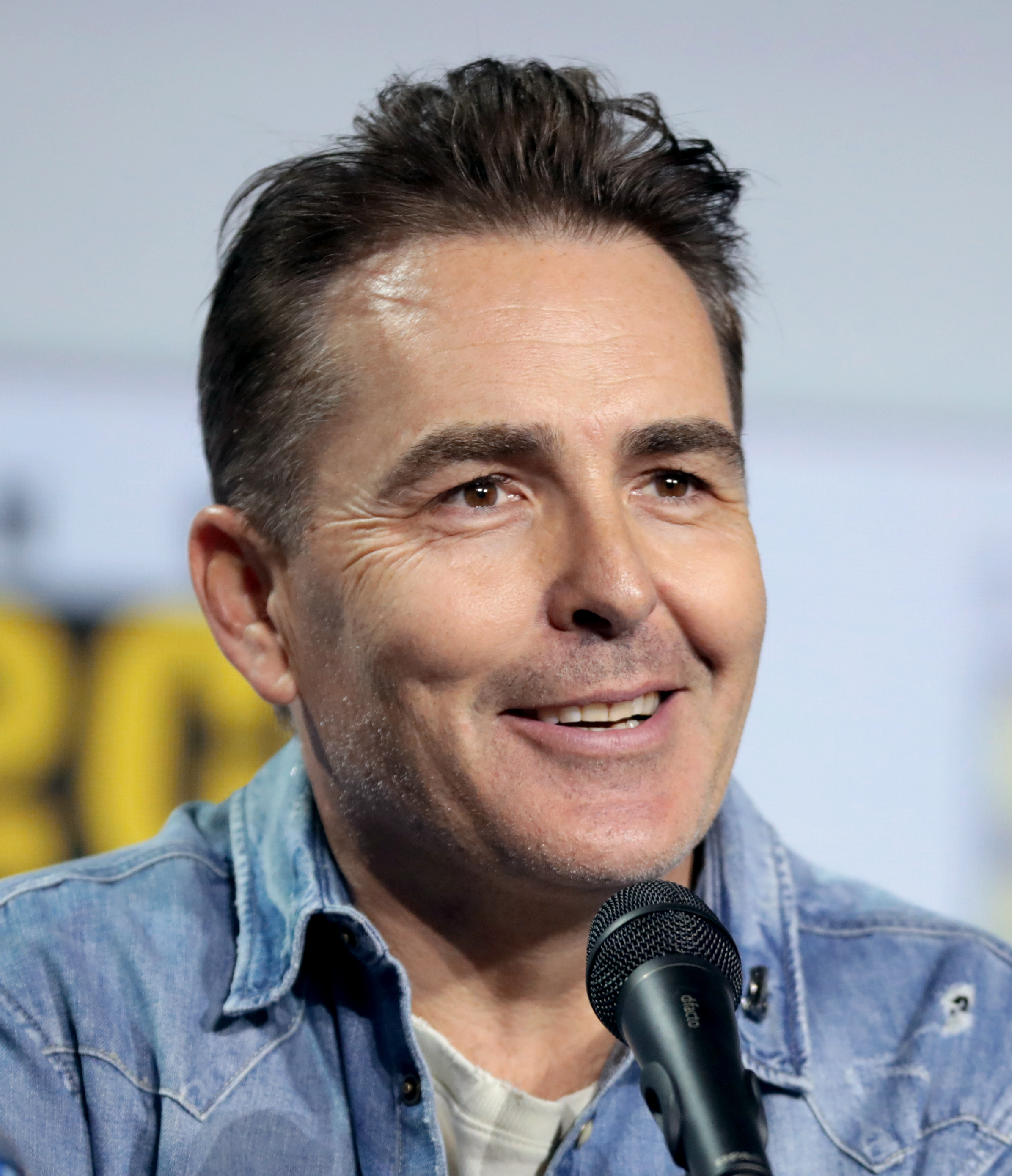
Nolan North portrayed Nathan Drake in the video game series.

Naughty Dog wanted Drake to embody the everyman archetype. E. Daniel Arey, former Naughty Dog creative director, said that "there is a fine line between jerk and lovable rogue", and that they developed Drake to be more human and accessible: "If a hero constantly shows their human side, we relate and forgive any seeming overconfidence because we’ve all been there". Neil Druckmann, lead designer of Uncharted 2: Among Thieves, explained that Drake was meant to react to situations in the manner that the average player might. Hennig commented:

... when we set out to do Uncharted, we decided we wanted to tackle one of these beloved action-adventure games in the spirit of this whole tradition. We knew that in order to pull it off, we had to have a hero who was completely relatable, just a regular guy. So when people saw him and said "Why do I want to play a guy in t-shirt and jeans" that was a deliberate move on our part, to say look, he's just a guy. He's just like you and me.

Josh Scherr, leader of the Drake's Fortune story sequence team, said that they created Drake as an "ordinary guy" with no special powers. Instead, Drake became visibly nervous at times, barely cleared objects while jumping, and stumbled while running. The characterizations were meant to show Drake as a frail character. He is not a master of hand-to-hand combat, and throws punches without style or skill. Sam Thompson, producer of Among Thieves, described Drake's martial arts abilities as "fallible". Sony Computer Entertainment America line producer Sam Thompson mused that Naughty Dog had created iconic characters before, including Crash Bandicoot. With Nathan Drake, however, the company wanted to produce a more average character, one who did not possess the same amount of confidence and who was more realistic and humble.

Nolan North, the actor who played Drake, had a large role in defining the character's physical and vocal reactions. In the Uncharted series, the actors were used for motion capture, and acted as if performing in a movie. Motion capture was done on a soundstage, and the dialog recorded during this process was used in the game. North was allowed to ad-lib dialog and insert aspects of his own personality into the character. In naming the character, the development team considered many different choices, including Ethan, Samuel, and John. Matthew Drake was seriously contemplated, but received a poor reaction from those it was presented to. Eventually, Naughty Dog settled on the name Nathan for its ability to be shortened to Nate, and the perception that it sounded historical. According to animator Jonathan Cooper, Drake does not take bullet damage during gameplay; the red effect in-game indicates his luck running out before he is finally shot.

== Attributes ==
=== Personality ===
Drake has a distinct personality, as the creators did not want him to appear as a caricature or "cardboard cutout". Hennig constantly elaborated Drake's personality through in-game dialogue and interactions with other characters, rather than exclusively through cutaway scenes. Drake reacts to events in a human-like way, often commenting and complaining on the absurdity or difficulty of his situation. While traveling through chapters, Drake frequently makes sarcastic quips and taunts. Self-educated in history and various languages, Drake is also highly intelligent. Matt Casamassina of IGN commented on the character's interactions during gameplay that reveal Drake's nature: "it's lighthearted and amusing, but it also demonstrates that Nate is aware of how absurd his predicaments sometimes are. It's a small, unimportant communication, but it makes sense that the two would behave exactly as they do".

Drake says what he is thinking aloud, a feature designed to correlate with the likely thoughts and reactions of the player. Amy Hennig called Drake a "Die Hard guy that gets in there and just takes care of the situation; 'the fly in the ointment'". North was instructed to imbue his own personality into the character.

=== Outward appearance ===
Drake's outward appearance is fairly generic, consisting of either a plain T-shirt or henley, jeans, and a gun holster on his back. He was deliberately costumed in a simple shirt and jeans to provide a "blank slate" on which the everyman persona could be imposed. The programmers designed a layered-animation system to make Drake's motions realistic by blending multiple poses and reactions together. This allowed a complex facial and wrinkle mapping system, which provided Drake more human emotional reactions. Drake's physique is fairly fit, but not overly muscular. Drake's appearance underwent minor changes in Uncharted 2: Among Thieves. Hennig said that Drake was skinnier than intended in the first game, and thus the designers bulked him up for the second.

Drake's shirt is always tucked into his pants on only one side, an attribute which commentators have labeled the "half-tuck". The term, first coined by video game designer Tim Schafer, led to Naughty Dog altering Drake's appearance to have his shirt almost tucked in from the front, and half tucked in at the back, an inside joke Naughty Dog co-president Evan Wells labeled a "three-quarters-tuck". The half-tuck was part of a larger effort to ensure Drake's design was asymmetrical. Tim Schafer commented that "it was all super next-gen, but the most next-gen thing about it to me was Drake's shirt. Check it out: Somehow it's tucked in, and yet not tucked in, at the very same time. Of all the technical marvels contained in Uncharted, this was the one that really mystified me".

== Appearances ==
=== Main series ===
==== In Uncharted: Drake's Fortune ====
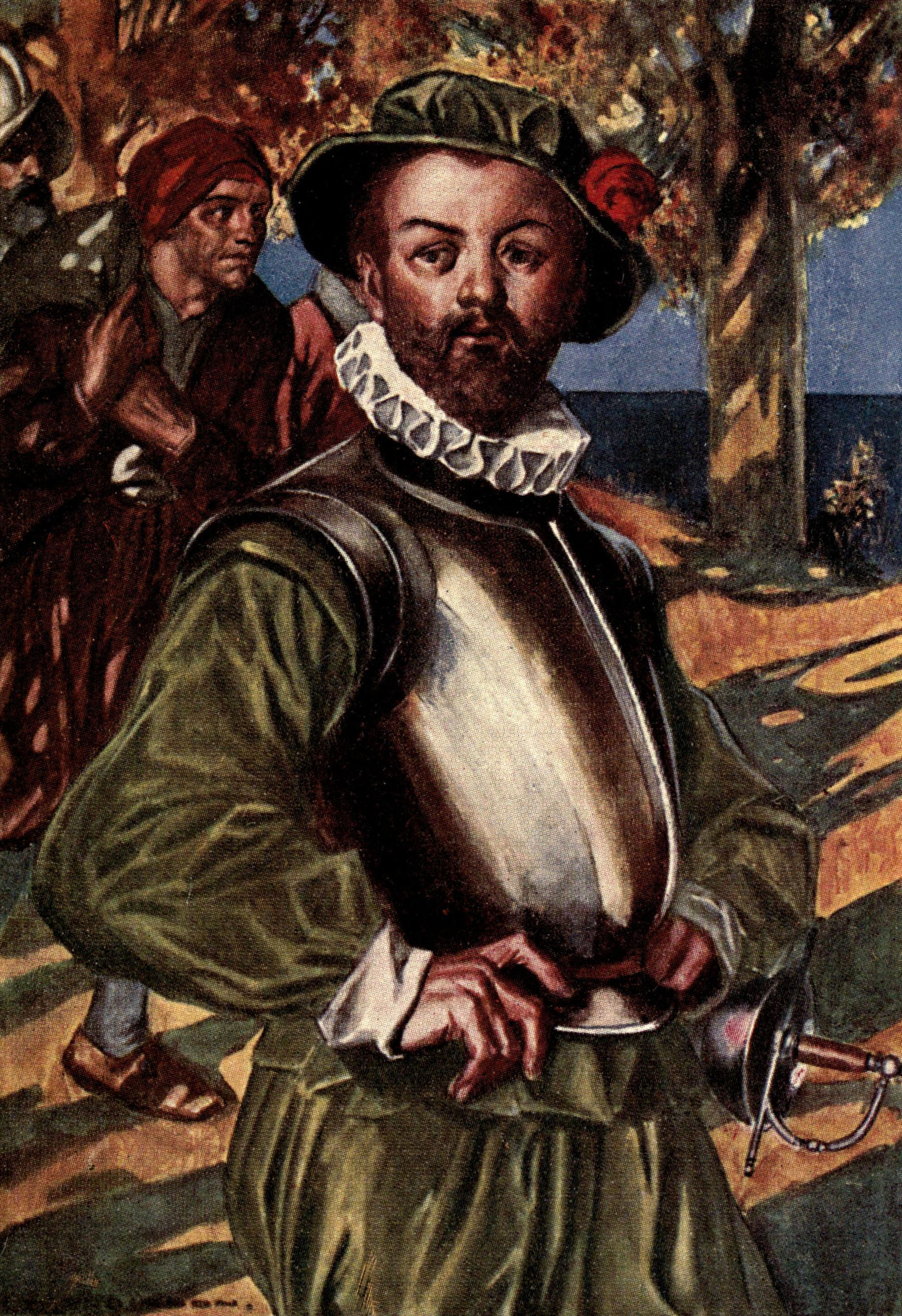
Nathan Drake is portrayed as the self-proclaimed descendant of explorer and buccaneer Sir Francis Drake.

Uncharted: Drake's Fortune, Drake tracks the lost treasure of El Dorado located on a remote tropical island. As the game opens, Drake, accompanied by reporter Elena Fisher, recovers the coffin of his self-proclaimed ancestor Sir Francis Drake, which he located from coordinates inscribed on a family heirloom: a ring Drake wears around his neck. The coffin contains Sir Francis Drake's diary, which gives the location of El Dorado. Pirates attack and destroy Drake's boat, but Drake's friend Victor Sullivan rescues the two. When Sully and Drake follow the diary to the indicated spot, they learn that El Dorado is a large golden idol that the Spanish had tried to remove from the island centuries ago. After finding a U-boat, mercenaries led by Gabriel Roman intercept Drake, Fisher and Sully. Sully is shot but Drake manages to escape to an island where Sir Francis Drake's diary claims the idol is located. On the way to the island, anti-aircraft fire forces Elena and Drake to bail out of the airplane and they are separated. Drake heads toward an old Spanish fort to find Elena. Though briefly captured by pirate leader Eddie Raja, an old acquaintance, Drake and Elena reunite and flee to the old customs house on the island. There they find that Sully has survived his gunshot wound. Drake discovers that the idol is located near the customs house, and finds and rescues Sully. Drake realizes that the idol is cursed, and that it turned the Spanish and Kriegsmarine searching for it into zombified monsters. Drake attempts to stop Roman from removing the idol from the island, and arrives in time to see Atoq Navarro, a man hired by Roman, find the statue. Navarro tricks Roman into becoming cursed. Drake then jumps onto the statue and rides it as it is airlifted onto a boat in the bay. There he defeats Navarro and manages to sink the idol to the bottom of the ocean. Sully arrives and Elena and Drake leave the island with several chests of treasure, after displaying affection towards each other.

==== In Uncharted 2: Among Thieves ====
Drake returns as the protagonist of Uncharted 2: Among Thieves in 2009. A wealthy benefactor hires Drake, Harry Flynn, and Chloe Frazer to steal a small lamp from a Turkish museum. Drake and Chloe, having dated in the past, renew their romance behind Flynn's back. Once in the museum, Flynn betrays Drake and Drake is imprisoned. Drake theorizes that the true goal of the theft was to discover the location of Marco Polo's lost fleet. Flynn brings the information obtained from resin found in the lamp to his employer, war criminal Zoran Lazarevic, who seeks the Cintamani Stone that the fleet was supposedly transporting. Once Chloe and Sully secure Drake's release, Drake follows Lazarevic, and discovers that the fleet did not possess the stone, but had clues, including a phurba, to the location of Shambhala. Drake travels to Nepal to find the next clue, although Lazarevic has initiated a civil war in the region in order to find the temple containing the clue. In the city, he finds Elena and her cameraman Jeff, the latter of which is executed by Lazarevic. Drake pursues Lazarevic and then discovers the key to Shambhala, but the train they are traveling on explodes, leaving Drake stranded. Drake loses consciousness after finding the phurba and awakens in a Tibetan village. Here, he finds Karl Schäfer, an SS officer who had led an Ahnenerbe expedition to Shambhala, though he had killed them all to stop the Nazis from obtaining the power in the city. Tenzin, a man who speaks no English, leads Drake through an ice cave, where they are attacked by giant horned monsters. Lazarevic attacks the village, kidnapping Schäfer. Drake and Elena track Lazarevic to a monastery, where they find the entrance to Shambhala. Once inside, they discover that the monsters are guardians of the city. Drake and Elena are apprehended by Lazarevic but escape him when the guardians attack. Drake confronts Lazarevic at the Tree of Life, the sap of which comprises the Cintamani stone. Drake wounds Lazarevic, leaving the guardians to kill him, and returns to the village, where he and Elena kiss and begin a relationship.

==== In Uncharted 3: Drake's Deception ====
The third installment of the franchise, Uncharted 3: Drake's Deception, has Drake searching for the lost city of Iram of the Pillars, located in the Rub' al Khali Desert. During the gap between the two games, Drake and Elena married, but then became estranged and are now separated. It is revealed in this game that Drake's past is more mysterious than the player is led to believe. It eventually transpires that Drake is not his real last name (his real surname, Morgan, is not revealed until Uncharted 4) and he was raised in a Catholic orphanage from the age of five. His mother committed suicide and his father handed the child over to the state. He ran away from the orphanage and traveled to Colombia, where, at the age of 15, he acquired Francis Drake's ring (which he has referred to as a family heirloom in the first game) by stealing it from a museum. This led to him teaming up with Victor Sullivan for the first time. With the assistance of Sully, Chloe, and Charlie Cutter, Drake steals valuable historical clues from a mysterious organization led by Katherine Marlowe and her assistant Talbot. They travel to France and Syria where they find clues leading them to Yemen, where Drake reluctantly enlists the help of Elena. They find a celestial map that shows the location of Iram. However, Sully is kidnapped by Marlowe and Talbot, prompting Drake to save him by boarding one of Marlowe's cargo planes. The plane crashes in the Rub' al Khali after a shoot-out ensues but Drake survives. After wandering the desert for days, a group of horsemen, led by Salim, rescue Drake and take him back to their encampment. Salim explains to Drake they must stop Marlowe and Talbot from reaching the lost city so they will not get their hands on the hallucinogenic power of the Djinn. Drake and Salim rescue Sully from Marlowe's caravan and reach the city. Drake and Sully destroy the winch pulling the brass vessel containing the Djinn from the waters causing the whole city to collapse. Marlowe is killed in quicksand and Drake shoots Talbot before he can kill Sully. Drake and Sully escape the sinking city and reunite with Elena back at Yemen. Drake and Elena appear to resolve their marriage and they fly back home on their new sea plane.

==== In Uncharted 4: A Thief's End ====
The fourth and final entry in the series featuring Drake, Uncharted 4: A Thief's End, centers around him searching for the treasure of infamous pirate Henry Avery. As a child, Nate runs away from the orphanage and reunites with his older brother Sam, who explains that he has located their mother's journals. They break into the house they had been sold to where the elderly owner reveals she knew their mother, a historian who had theorized that Francis Drake had heirs. She dies of heart failure before she can call off the police, forcing Nate and Sam to flee and adopt the surname Drake. Some years before the events of Drake's Fortune, Nate and Sam, with the help of associate Rafe Adler, infiltrate a Panamanian prison where they uncover a cross depicting Saint Dismas, the good thief. They begin their escape, however Sam is shot by guards and Nate and Rafe presume him dead. Several years after Drake's Deception, Nate has retired from treasure-hunting and lives with Elena whilst working as a salvager in New Orleans. Sam, who survived and spent the intervening years alive and imprisoned, visits Nate and reveals he was broken out of prison by drug lord Hector Alcazar, who has forced him to find Avery's treasure or be killed. Nate lies to Elena he has taken a salvaging job and, together with Sam and Sully, steals another cross from an auction, bringing them into conflict with Rafe and his partner, mercenary leader Nadine Ross. The item leads the trio to Scotland, where the Drakes find a map of King's Bay in Madagascar. Nadine corners the two but they escape. At King's Bay, they learn that Avery and other pirate captains pooled all their treasure and settled with it in Libertalia. At their hotel they find Elena, upset at Nate's deception, and she leaves, but despite this, Nate refuses to abandon the search. He and Sam travel to the island where Libertalia is and discover that the treasure was moved across the island to the town of New Devon. They are soon confronted by Nadine and Rafe, who reveals that he broke Sam out of prison, Alcazar having been long dead. Rafe tries to shoot Nate, who is inadvertently knocked off a cliff and later rescued by Elena. They travel to New Devon, discovering Avery and his second in-command, Thomas Tew, killed the other founders and kept the treasure for themselves. The two locate and rescue Sam with the help of Sully and decide to escape, but Sam decides to continue the hunt. Nate follows him and finds Avery's treasure-laden ship where Sam triggers a trap that sets the ship on fire. Nadine betrays Rafe and leaves, having grown tired of the risks involved. Rafe challenges Nate to a sword fight, ending in Nate dropping a load of treasure on him. Nate rescues Sam and they are picked up by Elena and Sully. Afterwards, Sam and Sully team up together while Elena buys the salvage company, installing Nate as owner. Years later, their teenage daughter Cassie discovers evidence of the two's former treasure-hunting life, which they decide to tell her about.

=== Other games ===
Drake features in Uncharted: Drake's Trail, an online browser game and prequel to Uncharted: Drake's Fortune, released in 2007. He also stars in 2011's Uncharted: Golden Abyss, which was released on Sony's PlayStation Vita. The game's events take place sometime before those of Drake's Fortune, though developers have stated that it is not a prequel to Drake's Fortune but rather a separate original story. Nathan Drake was also on the shortlist for being a guest character in Street Fighter x Tekken, however the idea was scrapped. Additionally, Drake makes a cameo appearance in Astro's Playroom, a launch title for the PlayStation 5 designed as a celebration of the PlayStation brand, as well as its sequel. He was also added to Fortnite Battle Royale with Chloe Frazer in February 2022.

Drake is a playable character in PlayStation All-Stars Battle Royale released on PlayStation 3. Drake also features in Uncharted: Fight for Fortune, a turn-based card game released for the PlayStation Vita, and Uncharted: Fortune Hunter, a free-to-play mobile game released in 2016.

=== In other media ===
Tom Holland as Nathan Drake in the 2022 film adaptation

Uncharted: Eye of Indra is a 2009 prequel series of motion comics. Their events occur before the first game, but the series was released after the second. In order to raise the money to find Sir Francis Drake's coffin, Nathan Drake works for an American-turned-Indonesian crime boss named Daniel Pinkerton. Drake seeks the fabled Eye of Indra in Jakarta, where he meets Eddy Raja – who appears in the first game – and Drake becomes romantically involved with Raja's sister, Rika Raja. In 2011 Uncharted: The Fourth Labyrinth, a standalone novel written by Christopher Golden was set between the events of the first and second game, and involves Drake working to uncover the mysteries of King Midas and several ancient labyrinths. Drake has also appeared in the 2018 live action fan film, and was played by Nathan Fillion. DC Comics released a six-part comic book miniseries in 2011, titled Uncharted, set between the events of the second and third game, which sees Drake searching for the legendary city of Agartha. Tom Holland portrayed Nathan Drake in the 2022 film adaptation.

== Reception ==
Nathan Drake has attracted mainly positive reviews, many focusing on his likable personality. Tom Cross of Gamasutra called Drake a "lovable jerk" who is "light, flippant, and just plain fun", calling him a perfect caricature of a scoundrel. Stephen Totilo of Kotaku remarked that "the short take is that Nathan Drake has attitude without being a jerk, and he cheerfully but woefully gets in over his head. This helps make him charming rather than annoying". Comparing Drake to a similar character, Matt Casamassina at IGN claimed: "Nathan Drake, the hero in Naughty Dog's Uncharted 2, is more realistic, funny, charming, likable and altogether human in 30 minutes than Leon S. Kennedy is through an entire career of Resident Evil games". Rush Frushtick at UGO admitted that Drake may appear to be "kind of a dick", but that he was "a likable dick". GamesRadar listed Nathan as one of the 25 best new characters of the decade, contrasting him with characters like Halo protagonist Master Chief and Marcus Fenix of the Gears of War series in that unlike them, Drake is never in control of the situation. GamesRadar later ranked Drake in 2012 as the third "most memorable, influential, and badass" protagonist in games, saying: "With his half-tuck, quick wit, wry grin, and messy hair, Nate perfectly captures the sentiment of being the guy all the other guys want to be and all the gals want to be with..." Empire included Drake on their list of the 50 greatest video game characters, ranking him in 22nd place. In 2009, Drake was featured as one of 64 characters in GameSpot as the "Greatest Game Hero" poll, in which he lost to Pikachu. Drake was voted as the fourth best character of the decade in a 2010 poll conducted by Game Informer, and was voted as the 16th top video game character of all time by the readers of Guinness World Records Gamer's Edition in 2011. Nathan Drake is also seen as a PlayStation mascot. He was ranked as one of the best video game characters of the 2010s by Polygon staff and writer Colin Campbell wrote that "he is apt to make jokes about the sticky situations he finds himself in, and the many convoluted conspiracies he faces. But he also displays loyalty to those close to him". In 2021, HobbyConsolas also included Nathan on their "The 30 best heroes of the last 30 years." In 2024, a poll conducted by BAFTA with around 4,000 respondents named Nathan as the twentieth most iconic video-game character of all time.

Drake's physical attractiveness has been another area of commentary, with at least one reviewer declaring a man crush for him. Drake has been described as "dreamy", and a "handsome, charismatic hero". Claudia Black, who portrayed Chloe Frazer in Uncharted 2: Among Thieves, admitted having a crush on Drake as well. Drake has been cited as an example of a male character who, while attractive, is not over-masculine. One commentator pointed out: "Very few of our protagonists (Nathan Drake and Alan Wake to name a few exceptions) depict men in what I would call a non-degrading manner". Steve McGarvey of GameSpy wrote that Drake was "hardly oozing with machismo compared to the likes of most gaming protagonists". Drake's attractiveness drew criticism from Meagan Marie of Game Informer, who stated that he did not "stand out much among the crowd of other ideally proportioned and intentionally unblemished gaming icons". GameDaily named Drake the third greatest gaming hunk. GamesRadar named Drake "Mister 2007", stating that he was not picked just because they could "stare at his ass for hours on end", but because he is heroic and has a "winning attitude". In 2014, La Nueva España included him the top ten sexiest video game characters of both genders.

Commenting on Drake's "everyman" persona, Tom Hoggins of the Daily Telegraph called the character's vulnerability "endearing", while Chad Sapieha of The Globe and Mail labeled him "one of the most expressive video game characters ever created". However, Ben Kuchera of Ars Technica criticized that Drake was like numerous other characters, and lacked individuality. Develop's Owain Bennallack further criticized Drake's blandness, doubting whether a player could adequately describe him as a character. Dan Hsu of Bitmob wrote that, though other characters like Master Chief may stand out more, Drake came across as an "old pal".

Nathan Drake has been compared to several other video game and film characters, most notably video game adventurer Lara Croft from the Tomb Raider franchise and film character Indiana Jones, due to the similarities between the characters and the narratives they appear in. Johnny Minkley of Eurogamer and Lee Ferran of ABC News called these associations "obvious" and "unavoidable". In fact, Drake has been called a mixture of the two characters. Drake was hailed as the "new Lara Croft" after the Uncharted series sold well, and his similarity to Croft has earned him the moniker "bloke-" or "dude-raider". Michael Owen-Brown of The Advertiser remarked that Drake distinguished himself from Croft with his wit, while director of the Uncharted series Bruce Straley claimed that Drake had equaled Croft in popularity. CBS drew a strict distinction between Indiana Jones and Drake, pointing out that while Jones acts altruistically, Drake is in it for the profits. Avi Arad, producer of the upcoming Uncharted feature film, drew a similar conclusion, remarking that while Jones was always good, Drake is not necessarily the good guy. Designer Neil Druckmann stated that he believes Drake stands apart from Jones and Croft. Other reviewers have compared Drake to different characters, including Jack Colton from the film Romancing the Stone. North, who plays Drake, also voices The Prince in the 2008 video game Prince of Persia, and comparisons have been made between the two characters. The Prince has been described as a rougher, more abrasive form of Nathan Drake.

An article published by Vice Media, which told of the then upcoming release of Uncharted 4: A Thief's End, included a lengthy interview with Dr. E. Lee Spence, who was described as "a pioneer in the field of underwater archaeology, a world-renowned treasure hunter, and just about as close to an actual living, breathing Nathan Drake as you're ever going to find". In its URL, Vice also billed Spence as the "real Nathan Drake".

The good sales of the Uncharted series and the growing identification of Drake with the PlayStation 3 console have led some to claim he is now a de facto mascot for the PlayStation 3. Adam Hartley at TechRadar UK claimed, that "throaty-voiced protagonist Nathan Drake is the rightful heir to the 'PlayStation Hero' crown", while Now Gamer claimed Drake as the new PlayStation 3 poster boy. Drake was nominated for the "Most Compelling Character" award at the 2009 Inside Gaming Awards.

Nonetheless, the character has also received criticism for the excessive killing taking place in the Uncharted games. In response, Druckmann commented about it:

You always try to make sure the writing and the gameplay fit within the context of each other and we work really hard on that, adjusting gameplay, adjusting writing. You know, in an action game you’re probably gonna kill more people than you see in a film.

As a nod to the concept of the criticism, a trophy was included in Uncharted 4, named 'Ludonarrative Dissonance', with the description "Kill 1,000 enemies".

=== Merchandise and promotion ===
In 2007, Sony placed promotional material in Empire stressing Drake's everyman personality and showcasing his similarity to adventure film characters. Naughty Dog released an airsoft replica of Nathan Drake's gun, a Beretta 92FS.

Shortly before the release of Uncharted 2: Among Thieves, four urban vinyl toys based on Nathan Drake were released. Erick Scarecrow, founder of ESC Toys, designed the dolls in a number of colors; only 2500 were released worldwide. Reviewers were not enthusiastic about the design, and Luke Plunkett of Kotaku commented, "while none of them have names, it appears there's Drake, Hellboy Drake, Berlin Nightclub Drake and Radioactive Drake".

In February 2016, Naughty Dog announced the release of a 7-inch Nathan Drake action with articulated joints and an arsenal of gear and accessories. This action figure is being made by the toy company National Entertainment Collectibles Association, also known as NECA.
