= Uncharted: Golden Abyss =

2011 video game

- North American cover art
- Developer: Bend Studio
- Publisher: Sony Computer Entertainment
- Director: John Garvin
- Producer: Gerald Harrison
- Designer: Ron Allen
- Artist: Gregory Callahan
- Writer: John Garvin
- Composer: Clint Bajakian
- Series: Uncharted
- Platform: PlayStation Vita
- Release: JP: December 17, 2011; NA: February 15, 2012; EU: February 22, 2012; AU: February 23, 2012
- Genres: Action-adventure, third-person shooter
- Mode: Single-player

Uncharted: Golden Abyss is a 2011 action-adventure game developed by Bend Studio and published by Sony Computer Entertainment for the PlayStation Vita. A spin-off of Naughty Dog's Uncharted series, the game was released as a launch title for the console. Golden Abyss is a prequel to the series, taking place before the events of Uncharted: Drake's Fortune. The story revolves around adventurer-treasure hunter Nathan Drake as he becomes involved in a search for the lost city of Quivira and is aided by fellow treasure hunter Marisa Chase. Gameplay combines action-adventure with platforming elements, with players solving puzzles and fighting enemies using cover-based third-person shooting.

Concept work for Golden Abyss began in 2007, when Sony asked Bend Studio to develop a new Uncharted as a console launch title. Due to the changing specifications of the Vita, much of the early development was done using PlayStation 3 hardware. The entire project was overseen by original developer Naughty Dog, with Bend Studio receiving assets from the first two Uncharted titles and getting access to their motion capture facilities. John Garvin was both director and scriptwriter, the latter under the supervision of main series writer Amy Hennig. Hennig also ensured the return of Nolan North as Drake and Richard McGonagle as Sully.

The game was revealed in January 2011 alongside the Vita. Golden Abyss debuted to strong sales and generally positive critical reception. Journalists praised its graphics, voice performances, and recreation of Uncharted gameplay on the platform. Criticism focused on its storyline and implementation of Vita-specific controls. To date, the game remains exclusive to the platform, as it was left out of the PlayStation 4's Uncharted: The Nathan Drake Collection due to the standalone nature of its narrative.

== Gameplay ==
Protagonist Nathan Drake scales jungle-covered ruins.

Uncharted: Golden Abyss is an action-adventure game played from a third-person perspective, with platforming and puzzle elements. The player controls Uncharted series protagonist Nathan Drake. Progressing through a series of linear levels, Nathan explores a variety of environments including jungles, temple ruins, caverns and encampments.

During platforming, Nathan climbs along ledges and jumps between platforms created by the environments. Some levels include multiple paths and hidden areas with collectible treasures. During some sections, Nathan also swims through bodies of water, and rows a canoe down a river. In combat, Nathan can use stealthy takedowns, and engage in cover-based third-person shooting against groups of enemies. Shooting can either be done with precise aiming or blind firing. Nathan can pick up and use a variety of weapons, including pistols, machine guns, shotguns, rocket launchers, and grenades.

The game's controls use a combination of traditional joystick and button commands, and the PlayStation Vita's motion and touch control functions. The motion controls play into aiming Nathan's weapons or balancing during crossing on a tightrope while swiping on the touchscreen can both be used to guide Nathan through and around the environment and are mandatory when performing melee attacks. Some melee sections play out in a similar manner to quick time events. Some puzzles involve using the touch screen to reveal clues or adjust mechanisms. The back touch functions allow the player to zoom in with the weapon camera view, and take pictures within the environment.

== Plot ==
The events of Golden Abyss take place before Uncharted: Drake's Fortune. Adventurer Nathan Drake accompanies old friend Jason Dante to a Panama dig site headed by the mistrustful Marisa Chase. At the site, they find the bodies of poisoned Spanish conquistadors and a grave marker with a Visigoth symbol. After Dante has to leave due to a phone call, Marisa shows Drake an amulet she hid from Dante, inherited from her grandfather Vincent Perez and they agree to team up. Nathan and Marisa are then attacked and captured by Dante's real partner, warlord Roberto Guerro, but the pair escape. They go to Perez's house, who hired Dante to continue his research after a terminal cancer diagnosis; Dante paid off Guerro for access to the site in return for a share of the treasure that Guerro will use to fund his conflict, while Marisa went there to finish her family's work. The pair learn that the marker referred to the Sete Cidades, an ancient Christian sect dedicated to finding the Seven Cities of Gold. Friar Marcos de Niza, a member of the sect, had been part of a failed expedition led by Francisco Vásquez de Coronado to find the city of Quivira.

Following further clues, one referring to a "Sword of Stephen", Nathan and Marisa follow Perez's trail to a ruined Sete Cidades retreat. They find Perez, who succumbed to his illness, as well as evidence that leads Nathan to suspect that de Niza deliberately misled Coronado. Nathan follows the ruins to a crypt that contains the Sword of Stephen—the personal sword of Esteban, de Niza's guide; however, they are interrupted by Dante and Guerro. Guerro takes the sword and Marisa after pushing Dante off a balcony for insulting him. Nathan and Dante reluctantly ally to escape the ruins and Guerro's army but are unable to stop Guerro from escaping with Marisa. Dante hires his mercenary army to avenge himself on Guerro, and Nathan leaves after they argue. Encountering his friend Victor "Sully" Sullivan, Nathan convinces him to help rescue Marisa and finish Perez's work. The two follow a map made from the charcoal rubbings of symbols found on the sword to a temple complex believed to house the entrance to Quivira. There they witness and fight through a battle between Dante's mercenaries and Guerro's men. Sully is injured in a fall, forcing Drake to continue by himself.

Nathan survives a rocket attack from Dante's mercenaries and enters Quivira where he rescues Marisa from survivors of Guerro's army. Using Marisa's amulet, they enter Quivira, discovering the "Golden Abyss", a gold-lined cavern linked by an underground lake. There they discover Esteban's corpse and a Geiger counter stowed in Chase's backpack revealing the gold to be irradiated from nearby uranium deposits. The people of Quivira slowly died out from radiation poisoning, and de Niza killed Esteban and his scouting party before deliberately misleading Coronado to keep the irradiated gold from being looted. Dante arrives, intending to sell the irradiated gold regardless, and Nathan beats him in a fistfight and escapes with Marisa. Marisa seals the Golden Abyss with explosives, trapping Dante inside, and Nathan has a last fight with Guerro which ends with Guerro falling through a damaged bridge to his death with the Sword of Stephen. Nathan and Marisa escape with Sully's help, and before leaving on a stolen helicopter Marisa throws away her amulet, saying it belongs "in hell" with the rest of Quivira.

== Development ==
Uncharted: Golden Abyss was developed by Bend Studio, a first-party production studio under Sony Computer Entertainment best known for creating the Syphon Filter series. Bend Studio was among the first studios to receive inside information about the Vita. As they were wrapping up production on Resistance: Retribution in 2008, the team decided they wanted to develop a new entry in the Uncharted series; at the time, the only released title was Uncharted: Drake's Fortune and had not gained the large industry presence it would. Bend Studio was chosen partly because of their long record of production quality titles for the PlayStation Portable (PSP). Bend Studio originally had a nine-person team working on the game, eventually expanding to 55 people. In addition to Bend Studio, several other studios collaborated on the title. Notable studios included MK Productions, which helped design some of the larger setpieces; Scratch Image, which handled lip-synching and facial animation; and the Visual Arts and Services Group, which polished the motion capture work. The music was composed by Clint Bajakian, who had previously worked as a music manager and minor composer on the other Uncharted titles. The sound and music design was outsourced to Sony's music staff, with thirty people assigned to the task.

Production ran in parallel to the final production stages of Uncharted 2: Among Thieves and the development of Uncharted 3: Drake's Deception. The title was supervised by Uncharted studio Naughty Dog. While Sony was immediately willing for Bend Studio to create an Uncharted Vita title, Naughty Dog needed a lot more assurance and communication during pre-production. It was the studio's first launch title for a console, something that put extra pressure on the team during production. During the first year of production, the project was untitled, alternately using the working titles Uncharted X and Uncharted: Dark Secrets. The game's crunch period lasted from January to December 2011, putting a great deal of strain on the production team as they needed to give up weekends and holidays to finish the game on time. This had a debilitating impact on the team's morale, prompting the studio to put in solid work and overtime guidelines for future projects. An alpha build, technically playable from beginning to end, was completed in September, with play and focus testing enabling the team to adjust the playtime and streamline some elements.

=== Design ===
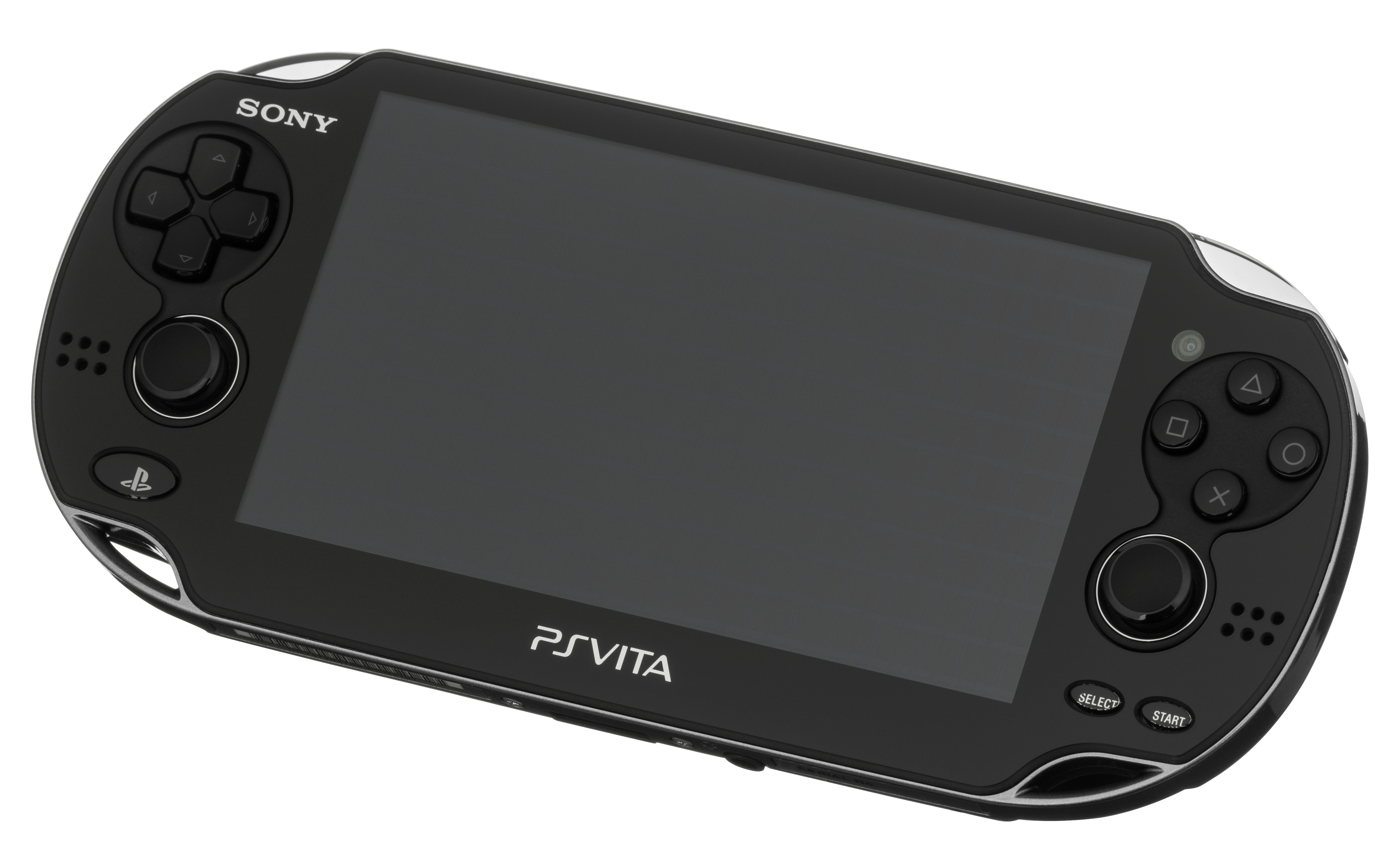
As a launch title for the PlayStation Vita, Bend Studio built Golden Abyss around its functions, but had to cope with changing hardware specifications.

The early prototype builds used PlayStation 3 (PS3) hardware up until the final year of production, with a dedicated game engine only appearing during that time. It was the first time Bend Studio had handled the hardware, as their previous work had transitioned straight from PlayStation 2 to PSP. One of the early design prototypes had the game taking place around an open world hub with quests, but the team had no experience with open-world design and combined with story problems this version was scrapped. During production, Bend Studio was in constant and detailed contact with Sony regarding the Vita, giving them a deep insight into how the console worked. This open communication was part of Sony's shift in console production following difficulties with the PSP, wanting input and feedback before release from associated game studios. It was also key to keeping production going in the wake of hardware breakdowns. Part of the production was creating a rough working prototype of an early level so the team could understand the Vita's functions. The locked narrative, necessary for production to begin, proved an issue as several gameplay segments had to be kept despite negatively impacting pacing and characterisation. The length of the game was also an issue, with Garvin later feeling they had been overly ambitious.

A key inclusion was the Vita's touch-based control functions, as Garvin felt the team would have failed if the controls were similar to the PS3 entries. While there was speculation that Sony forced Bend Studio not to include other control options for elements like melee attacks, Garvin clarified that Bend Studio made the call. A recurrent issue was that the hardware specifications were changing all the time, with new information coming in every three months or so and their single Vita development kit being "the size of a PC". When motion controls were agreed upon, the team had to improvise using a PS3 Sixaxis controller, and until the introduction of the OLED screen, making the touch controls work was a constant struggle as their test model used the standard PSP screen. Getting motion controls to work alongside traditional controls while keeping the Uncharted gameplay style intact was one of the biggest challenges during development. The canoe section, which made extensive use of touch commands, was trimmed down based on negative feedback from test players.

When designing the game's levels and visuals, the team was given access to the source code and texture library for the first two Uncharted titles. The Vita's hardware meant that the graphics could potentially match those used on the PS3, allowing the team to pursue the visual quality of Uncharted 2, which had then entered beta testing and wowed them with its graphics. The team wanted to match the production values of the PS3 games, but they had a leaner polygon limit and so had to carefully combine polygonal models and painted backgrounds to emulate the style. To simplify the level design, around 80% of levels used stock geometry compared to 20% unique architecture. Compared to Resistance: Retribution, which displayed 50,000 polygons per frame, Golden Abyss featured around 260,000 per frame.

=== Story and characters ===
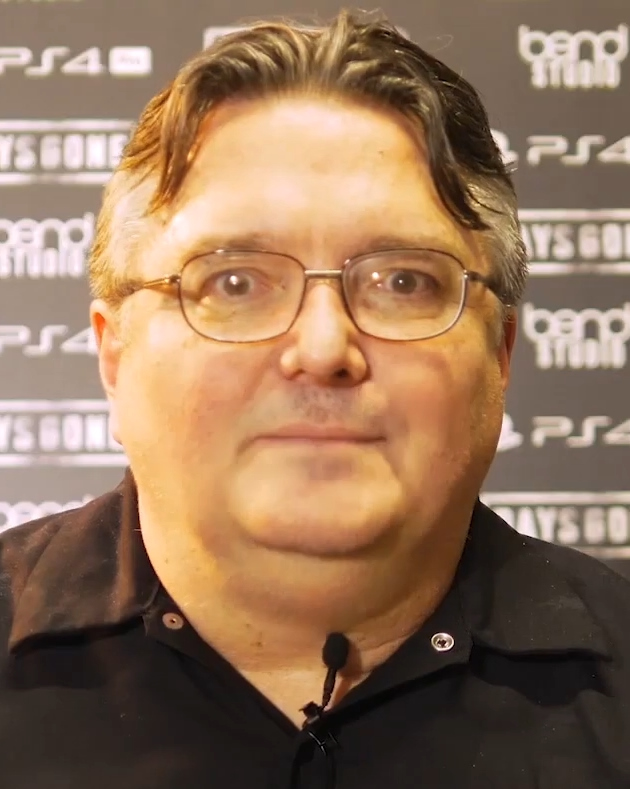
Director and scriptwriter John Garvin in 2019

The scenario was written by Garvin, reprising his dual role as director and scenarist from the Syphon Filter series. During the early production, Garvin met with main series writer Amy Hennig and Naughty Dog president Evan Wells, going through brainstorming sessions and having several early concepts "shot down". Hennig also vetted Garvin's scripts. The game's jungle setting, and Drake's search for Quivira, were present from the early presentations. The storyline and script was the very first element to begin production, with the story and key scenes being locked in place before any gameplay assets were completed. Nathan's characterization was described as cockier than the main trilogy and being led around by others rather than leading the way, with the events of Golden Abyss being his first life-threatening challenge as an adventurer. When Garvin began writing, he thought it would be simple due to his previous scenario work, but found the series' story and character formula very challenging;

"To start, the franchise formula is challenging. You have to find a compelling historical mystery with "gaps" that can be filled creatively; the history needs to be real and researched; you need a MacGuffin that is valuable, that people may have heard of, and that is potentially cursed; settings and plots need to be realistic, fantastic elements need to be reasonable in an X-Files sort of way; the tone should be mostly light in a summer blockbuster style; settings have to be traversable, exotic, romantic, and, well, uncharted in some way; there needs to be an army of bad guys to kill; the story has to lend itself to puzzles, twists, turns, surprises; bad guys have to be interesting, powerful, but not clichéd... and you have to do all this without repeating what has already been done in Uncharted 1, 2, and 3 (not to mention avoiding overused tropes from genre film franchises). I severely underestimated the amount of work this was going to be."

Garvin created the narrative hook surrounding Marcos de Niza very early in production, but the characters and story beats were in flux during most of 2010. During the early draft, the two villains were Guerro and a rival called Salazar. Hennig was worried that it would be too similar to the villain dynamics of the first Uncharted. The story was stuck at this point until Garvin created the character of Dante, which provided an additional and more original foil for Nathan. The early story plan involved "grave robbing in Mesa Verde, lost temples in the Louisiana swamps, a museum heist during a hurricane in New Orleans and a boat chase through the Grand Canyon". The entire concept, aside from the basic narrative hook and jungle setting, was completely rewritten following input and criticism from Hennig. The second version was based around the open-world hub design, but this was dropped due to their lack of experience and the clash between Nathan's character and his necessary role as a mercenary type. The current story was constructed from salvageable sections from both drafts.

Marisa went through several changes due to test player feedback; she was originally written as a character who complained a lot and got herself into situations where she had to be rescued by Nathan, compared negatively to the status of Princess Peach in the Mario series. To remedy this, she was given a more forceful personality, and the gameplay sequences had Nathan assisting her escapes rather than saving her directly. During the concept development, several plot and scene details were changed or cut. During early production, the game was to be set between the first and second games featuring a role for recurring heroine Elena Fisher, along with showing some of Nathan's origin story. The narrative eventually settled into being a standalone prequel to the first game. A planned chapter would have explored the previous relationship between Nathan and Uncharted 2 antagonist Harry Flynn. They were also going to follow the series' recurring theme of supernatural elements by having Quivira's radiation-mutated people—dubbed Chindi—inhabiting the ruins. Both these concepts, and a section featuring exploration through a highland temple, were scrapped. The origin story concept was removed due to Naughty Dog already developing that element in Uncharted 3, while the Chindi were both a challenge to program and seen as too similar to the Descendants from the first game. In addition, the lack of supernatural elements helped distinguish the game from the main series. A mudslide set piece was cut after production began due to potential negative associations with the 2011 Tōhoku earthquake and tsunami. The locked script, while necessary, ended up negatively impacting production and pacing within the game.

=== Casting ===
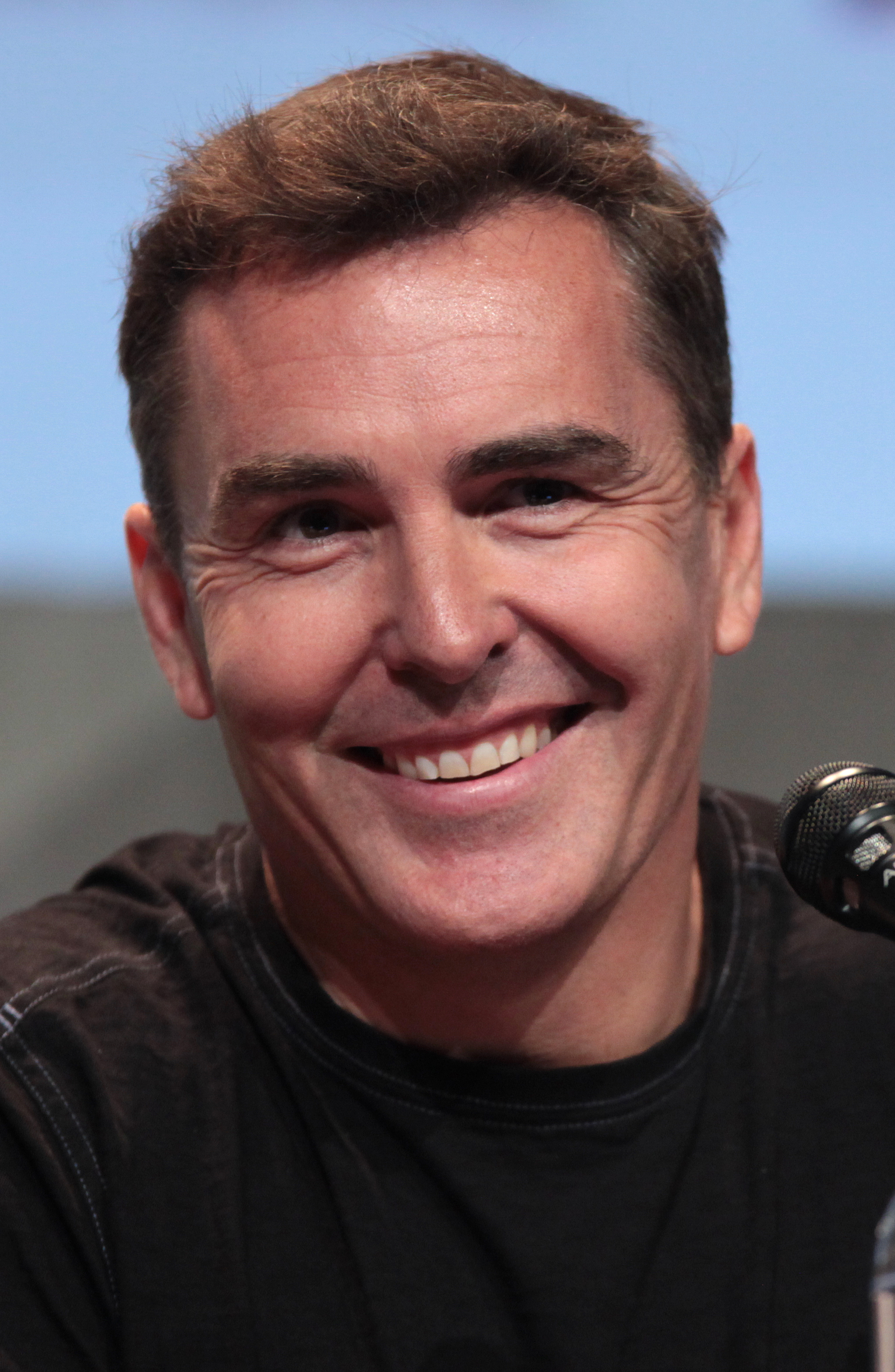
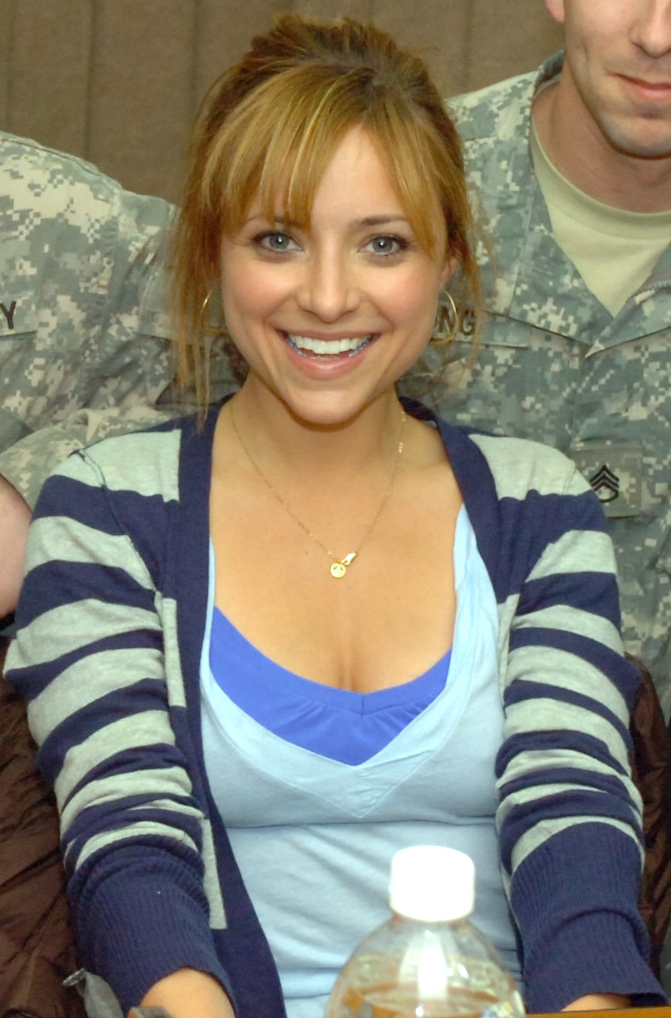
Nolan North (left) reprised his role as Nathan Drake, while series newcomer Christine Lakin was cast as female protagonist Marisa Chase. The two helped shape the characters and their interactions through in-studio ad-libs.

Hennig was key to securing Nolan North to reprise his role as Nathan Drake. She also vetted the new cast members. Richard McGonagle reprised his role as recurring supporting character Victor Sullivan. Two notable newcomers were veteran voice actor Jason Spisak as Dante, and Christine Lakin as Marisa Chase. Garvin recalled that Hennig commented that good actors could rescue even bad dialogue. Lakin called her experience acting a role in the Uncharted series as the fruition of a childhood dream of acting in an Indiana Jones-type action story. Chase's character was partially developed during voice recording through Lakin's delivery and ad-libbing. North in turn played off Lakin and added his ad-libs, creating unplanned but desirable chemistry between the pair.

As with previous Uncharted titles, cutscenes were shot in Naughty Dog's Culver City studio, with actions and dialogue being recorded at the same time, an approach Bend Studio had never used before. Naughty Dog gave Bend Studio access to all their motion capture library from the first two Uncharted games, which cut a considerable amount of time from development. It was Lakin's first motion capture role, making her anxious not to make any mistakes. She found the experience relatively easy due to her extensive theater work, as the motion capture studio compared by her to black box theater. She had a positive experience working alongside North and liked McGonagle though she never acted with him as they shared no scenes together. Motion capture filming took place across six three-day shoots between January and May 2011. This tight schedule was possible due to the overarching story being fixed, although smaller scenes and dialogue rewrites were still happening.

== Release ==
Rumors of the existence of Golden Abyss was leaked from an early stage, as Bend Studio shared information on the Vita and consequently their project for it with other interested studios. It was officially announced alongside the Vita in January 2011. A few weeks prior to the reveal, Bend Studio had to put together a demo level approaching the polish of their planned final product; their efforts to create the demo helped solidify a production pipeline for the rest of the game. Its official title was revealed in June of that year. In all regions, the game was a console launch title.

In Japan, the game was released on December 17, 2011. The Japanese dub took its cue from the English original, with the Japanese localization taking care to portray Nathan's immaturity and interactions with more experienced characters. Hiroki Tōchi reprised his role as Nathan's Japanese voice. In Japan, the game was given a new subtitle, translated as The Mapless Adventure Begins. The title was a reference to it being Nathan's first major adventure. After its Japanese release, Bend Studio were able to perform further polishing and prepare new features that were available at launch in the West. Golden Abyss later released on February 15, 2012, in North America; February 22 in Europe; and February 23 in Australia. It was also one of the debut titles when the Vita joined Sony's PlayStation Plus service on November 20 of that year.

The Treasure Map downloadable content (DLC) added a treasure map for each chapter to help players easily locate all the collectibles in a chapter. The 1.01 update released in February added "Black Market", an in-game store enabling players to trade and receive bounty items that are collected in the game with other Vita players using the PS Vita's "NEAR" application. Patch 1.02, released in May, included fixes and solved an issue raised by players where the game automatically disconnected the game from PlayStation Network upon start-up. The final patch 1.03 featured more adjustments, and implemented a gameplay collectable related to the spin-off title Uncharted: Fight for Fortune. To date, Golden Abyss remains exclusive to the Vita. When the PlayStation 4 collection Uncharted: The Nathan Drake Collection was being developed by Bluepoint Games, Naughty Dog considered including the game. Its standalone narrative meant it was considered non-essential for inclusion as the collection was meant to prime players for Uncharted 4: A Thief's End.

== Reception ==
Reception

Aggregate score
Aggregator	Score
Metacritic	80/100

Review scores
Publication	Score
1Up.com	B
Edge	7/10
Electronic Gaming Monthly	7/10
Eurogamer	8/10
Famitsu	35/40
G4	3.5/5
Game Informer	8/10
GameRevolution	4/5
GameSpot	7/10
GamesRadar+	4/5
GameTrailers	8.6/10
IGN	8.5/10

=== Critical response ===
Golden Abyss met with "generally favorable reviews", earning a score of 80 out of 100 on review aggregate site Metacritic based on 80 critic reviews. It was the 14th best-rated Vita title of 2012.

Jeremy Parish, writing for 1Up.com, described the story as "playing out like something straight from a serial adventure", noting the amount of historical research. Edge Magazine found the storyline intriguing and praised North's performance, but felt there was too much exposition. Japanese magazine Famitsu enjoyed the narrative, with one reviewer calling its mystery elements stronger than the main series. Ray Carsillo of Electronic Gaming Monthly enjoyed the storyline, saying it was a worthy entry into the series and supported by strong voice performances. Eurogamer's Tom Bramwell felt the narrative was weakest when it became lost in its use of legends, enjoying the story better when it focused on familiar characters. Rob Manual of G4 enjoyed the characters but cited problems with the storytelling and pacing; and Matt Hegelson, writing for Game Informer, faulted the dialogue and lack of connection to the main series. Sebastian Moss of Game Revolution praised Garvin's attempt to capture the series's style and the coherent story, while GameSpot's Mark Walton was unimpressed and said the narrative was "like a decent bit of fan fiction". GamesRadar said the story lacked strength, but its standalone style lent itself to being the start of similar spin-off titles, and GameTrailers noted that the mixture of stylistic elements, ranging from adventure to exploration, prevented the narrative becoming boring. IGN's Greg Miller was not impressed with the narrative.

Parish praised the graphics, saying they raised the bar for portable hardware and were stronger than a number of contemporary home console titles. Edge was amazed by the graphics on display, a sentiment shared by one of the four Famitsu reviewers. Carsillo referred to the graphics as being "console-quality". Bramwell praised the developer's efforts on the Vita hardware despite the graphics being lacking compared to games following the first Uncharted. While he noted some simplified graphics, Manuel praised the graphics as worthy of the series. Helgeson lauded the title as the best-looking handheld title ever made, Moss praised the close-up graphics while faulting the backgrounds as low quality. Both GamesRadar and Watson praised the graphics but had little commentary, and GameTrailers cited the graphics as "far beyond anything we’ve ever seen on a handheld". Miller cited the graphics as being equal to the first Uncharted.

Parish enjoyed the gameplay despite noting the continued dissonance between Nathan's reticence about killing named characters and taking out standard enemies and praising their smooth implementation within the hardware's gimmicks. Edge found the gameplay solid, but faulted the lack of innovations found in later home console Uncharted titles. Famitsu lauded the gameplay apart from some frustration completing touch screen puzzles. Carsillo was mixed about the gameplay, noting its solid base but finding the Vita-specific elements too intrusive. Bramwell enjoyed the gameplay, noting the extra freedom given to players compared to the heavily scripted home console entries. Manuel had a mixed experience with the gameplay due to the implementation of Vita functions, while Moss noted a lack of content and replayability compared to the home console series. Watson said the gameplay made up for deficiencies in the narrative despite problematic enemy AI. GamesRadar enjoyed the basic gameplay, but panned several pieces of inconsistent or confusing level design. GameTrailers noted a lack of large setpieces compared to the home console entries. Miller praised the gameplay as generally on the same level as the main series.

The touch and motion controls saw mixed reactions; a few critics praised their implementation, while others found them either awkward to use or poorly implemented. Other reviewers felt the developers were too keen to show them off, putting too many compulsory uses for the new functions into the game. Edge had a divided response, praising the motion-based aiming, but found the touch response unreliable.

=== Sales ===
Upon release in Japan, Golden Abyss debuted in sales charts in 8th place, according to sales data collector Media Create. With opening sales of over 48,000 units, it was the second best-selling Vita title of the week after Everybody's Golf 6. During February, according to the NPD Group, the game reached the top 20 best-selling video games, being the best-selling Vita title during that period. In 2018, Golden Abyss was revealed as the best-selling Vita title in the United States. In the UK, the game reached the top of the game charts during its debut week. The game was also the best-selling PlayStation Network title during its month of release.

=== Awards ===
Year	Award	Category	Result	Ref.
2012	NAVGTR	Camera Direction in a Game Engine	Nominated	
2012	NAVGTR	Sound Editing in a Game Cinema	Nominated	
2013	16th Annual D.I.C.E. Awards	Handheld Game of the Year	Nominated	
2013	16th Annual D.I.C.E. Awards	Outstanding Achievement in Animation	Nominated	
2013	British Academy Games Awards	Performer in 2013	Nominated	
2013	Writers Guild of America Awards	Video games	Nominated	
