= Uncharted: Fight for Fortune =

2012 video game

- Developers: Bend Studio; One Loop Games
- Publisher: Sony Computer Entertainment
- Series: Uncharted
- Platform: PlayStation Vita
- Release: NA: December 4, 2012; PAL: December 5, 2012
- Genre: Digital collectible card
- Modes: Single-player, multiplayer

Uncharted: Fight for Fortune is a 2012 digital collectible card video game developed by Bend Studio and One Loop Games and published by Sony Computer Entertainment for the PlayStation Vita. A spin-off of Naughty Dog's Uncharted series, players engage in turn-based matches using cards themed after characters and elements of the series. Bend Studio has previously contributed to the Uncharted series with Uncharted: Golden Abyss in early 2012.

Following release, it was supported by two downloadable content packs featuring cards themed after the second and third Uncharted titles. It saw mixed reviews from journalists, who enjoyed its gameplay but saw a lack of content and game balance. Online multiplayer services were shut down alongside that of the PlayStation Vita's in 2019.

== Gameplay ==
A battle in Uncharted: Fight for Fortune

Uncharted: Fight for Fortune is a turn-based digital collectible card game; the aim for players is to reduce an opponent's health to nothing, using cards based on characters, scenes and objects from the Uncharted series. During combat, one card attacks an opponent, with any card directly opposite absorbing the attack. At the beginning of each round in a match, the player chooses a selection of cards to place in one of five slots. The cards have different attack and defence statistics, and buffs to their abilities. Cards are divided into three factions; Heroes, Villains, or Mercs. Each Faction has an associated points value, drawing from a shared pool of points to play. These cards can be buffed with additional treasure cards, which impact their attack and defence values. Treasure cards can also be banked or held in the hand for a points bonus. In addition to the single-player mode against set antagonists taken from the series, players can engage each other in online asynchronous multiplayer.

== Development and release ==
Fight for Fortune was conceived and proposed in early 2012 by Bend Studio, who had just finished production on the spin-off title Uncharted: Golden Abyss. It was co-produced by Bend Studio and One Loop Games, a company known for supplementary work on console and full production of mobile titles. As with Golden Abyss, the game was supervised by series creator Naughty Dog. The team wanted to give a way for players to better experience the treasures designed by the team for the series as collectables, and also sought to break new ground with the series' gameplay styles.

The game was first leaked in early November 2012 and later officially revealed that same month. The game launched across the PlayStation Network on December 4 in North America, and December 5 in Europe. A patch released for Golden Abyss in November implemented redeemable cards themed after that game for Fight for Fortune. The game was supplemented with two downloadable content card packs themed after Uncharted 2: Among Thieves and Uncharted 3: Drake's Deception. The multiplayer closed down in September 2019.

== Reception ==
Reception

Aggregate score
Aggregator	Score
Metacritic	67/100

Review scores
Publication	Score
Destructoid	7.5/10
Edge	5/10
Eurogamer	6/10
IGN	7/10
TouchArcade	3/5

Fight for Fortune received "mixed or average" reviews according to review aggregate website Metacritic, earning a score of 67 points out of 100 based on 25 journalistic reviews. Destructoid reviewer Chris Carter enjoyed the experience and liked the aesthetic used in the card and game designs, but noted a lack of depth. Edge Magazine found the game in tone with the series's protagonist Nathan Drake and enjoyed the general premise, but found it lacking in replay value.

Eurogamer's Quintin Smith was fairly mixed about the game, enjoying it as a shallow distraction but finding little to sustain his interest in the title. Colin Moriarty of IGN praised its mechanics and rewarding gameplay loop, but noted issues connecting to the online functions and faulted this being the only means to engage in multiplayer. Pocket Gamer's Mike Rose called it "a fun little time-waster" between Uncharted titles, citing issues with fatigue due to repetition. Multiple reviewers cited the common fault of gameplay balance in multiplayer matches.
