= Uncharted =

Video game franchise

- Genre: Action-adventure
- Developers: Naughty Dog; Bend Studio; One Loop Games; Bluepoint Games; Playspree; Iron Galaxy
- Publisher: Sony Interactive Entertainment
- Creator: Amy Hennig
- Platforms: PlayStation 3; PlayStation Vita; PlayStation 4; Android; iOS; PlayStation 5; Windows
- First release: Uncharted: Drake's Fortune; November 19, 2007
- Latest release: Uncharted: Legacy of Thieves Collection; January 28, 2022

Uncharted is an action-adventure video game series and media franchise published by Sony Interactive Entertainment and developed by Naughty Dog. Created by Amy Hennig, the Uncharted franchise follows a group of treasure hunters who travel across the world to uncover various historical mysteries. The series features historical fiction, elements of fantasy and folklore, and fictional characters alongside real-world historical figures and events. In the main series, players control Nathan Drake; in the expansion, players control Chloe Frazer.

The franchise's first game, Uncharted: Drake's Fortune, was released in 2007, and followed by the sequels Uncharted 2: Among Thieves (2009), Uncharted 3: Drake's Deception (2011), and Uncharted 4: A Thief's End (2016). Spin-offs Uncharted: Golden Abyss (2011), Uncharted: Fight for Fortune (2012), and the standalone expansion Uncharted: The Lost Legacy (2017) also support the main series. Originally published exclusively for PlayStation consoles, the franchise later released games for other platforms, with the mobile spin-off Uncharted: Fortune Hunter (2016) and remasters of A Thief's End and The Lost Legacy for Windows in 2022.

The main games are played from a third-person perspective, with gameplay mostly revolving around combat, shooting, exploration, and puzzles, while platforming is used to navigate the environment. Later titles began including competitive and co-operative multiplayer game modes, stealth, and driving gameplay. Uncharted drew inspiration from other games, film, and additional media, and is known for featuring exotic locations. Several adaptations of the series have also been released, including a live-action film, board games, comics, and a novel.

The main series received critical acclaim, with praise for the stories, characters, voice acting, gameplay, and graphics, with its high production value being frequently compared to Hollywood-produced action-adventure films. It has also been credited by critics and publications for raising the standards of single-player action-adventure games, and its second and fourth numbered installments are consistently ranked among the greatest video games. Uncharted has sold over 41 million units, making it one of the best-selling video game franchises, helping the success of PlayStation during the seventh and eighth generation and elevating Naughty Dog's reputation as a renowned game developer.

== Titles ==
=== Main series ===
Release timeline
2007	Drake's Fortune
2008
2009	Among Thieves
2010
2011	Drake's Deception
2011	Golden Abyss
2012	Fight for Fortune
2013–2014
2015	The Nathan Drake Collection
2016	A Thief's End
2016	Fortune Hunter
2017	The Lost Legacy
2018–2021
2022	Legacy of Thieves Collection

Overview of Uncharted video games
Year	Title	Developer	Platforms
2007	Uncharted: Drake's Fortune	Naughty Dog	PlayStation 3
2009	Uncharted 2: Among Thieves	Naughty Dog	PlayStation 3
2011	Uncharted 3: Drake's Deception	Naughty Dog	PlayStation 3
2011	Uncharted: Golden Abyss	Bend Studio	PlayStation Vita
2012	Uncharted: Fight for Fortune	Bend Studio	PlayStation Vita
2015	Uncharted: The Nathan Drake Collection (Note: Contains remastered versions of Drake's Fortune, Among Thieves and Drake's Deception)	Bluepoint Games	PlayStation 4
2016	Uncharted 4: A Thief's End	Naughty Dog	PlayStation 4
2016	Uncharted: Fortune Hunter	Playspree	Android, iOS
2017	Uncharted: The Lost Legacy (Note: Standalone expansion to A Thief's End)	Naughty Dog	PlayStation 4
2022	Uncharted: Legacy of Thieves Collection (Note: Contains remastered versions of A Thief's End and The Lost Legacy)	Naughty Dog	PlayStation 5
2022	Uncharted: Legacy of Thieves Collection	Iron Galaxy	Windows

Notes:

Drake's Fortune, the first game in the series, was released for PlayStation 3 in November 2007. The system carried the following two installments of the main series, after Naughty Dog agreed to exclusively release the games on Sony systems. Among Thieves was published in 2009, and the creative team were afforded a greater license to utilize a larger amount of the system's random-access memory (RAM), due to an improved proprietary engine. It subsequently introduced more locales, higher free roam and combat abilities, and a larger map. Drake's Deception, released in 2011, built upon this aspect, while it also added an improved online multiplayer mode.

The following main installment, A Thief's End, was published on PlayStation 4, and focused on realism and detail. The last in the series to feature the main protagonist, it added driving elements and improved other gameplay aspects, like stealth and role-playing, and comprehensive upgrades to multiplayer. It was released to massive financial success, breaking multiple records. A free-to-play game for iOS and Android, Fortune Hunter, was released to tie in with A Thief's End.

=== Other games and compilations ===
Golden Abyss was published in 2011, and is the first in the series to be released on PlayStation Vita, marking the series' first on a handheld console. It is considered a prequel to the main series, although, some developers have stated that it acts as a separate, original story. In 2012, a turn-based card game titled Fight for Fortune was released. It was developed by One Loop Games, and contained interactive elements suitable for the Vita.

Drake's Trail is a now-defunct 2007 online game. The game was a browser-based game with alternative reality elements. Consisting of ten chapters, the story, serving as a prequel to Drake's Fortune, recounts journalist Elena Fisher hiring a private detective to track down famous treasure hunter Nathan Drake believing he is onto something big. The game was played using a Google Maps plugin to locate game areas within the real world, in conjunction with a Flash Player to explore those fictional locations (such as Drake's apartment) for clues to the next location.

The Nathan Drake Collection is a remastered collection of the series' first three installments, and was ported to PlayStation 4 by Bluepoint Games in October 2015. It was released to compensate for the delay in production for A Thief's End, which was originally slated for release in summer 2015. The game also included a voucher for the beta for the multiplayer for A Thief's End. The games feature enhancements such as new trophies, an in-game Photo Mode, and improved textures and gameplay. The multiplayer modes from Uncharted 2 and Uncharted 3 are excluded. It received positive reviews, with most praising the technical improvements and visual enhancements. The game was offered for free as part of Sony's Play at Home initiative during the COVID-19 pandemic in April–May 2020.

The Lost Legacy was released as a standalone expansion to A Thief's End, and marks the first entry in the series not to feature Drake. It features the characters Chloe Frazer and Nadine Ross, who previously appeared in Among Thieves and Drake's Deception, and A Thief's End, respectively. It was released on PlayStation 4 in 2017. Uncharted: Legacy of Thieves Collection, a remastered version of A Thief's End and The Lost Legacy, was released on January 28, 2022, for PlayStation 5; a Windows version, developed in collaboration with Iron Galaxy, was released on October 19, 2022.

== Common elements ==
=== Gameplay ===
Gameplay in the Uncharted series is a combination of action-adventure elements and 3D platforming with a third-person perspective. The player is given various physical tasks which must be completed to progress through the storyline, such as jumping, swimming, grabbing and moving along ledges, and climbing and swinging from ropes. Other aspects, including shooting, combat, and puzzle solving, also regularly feature. In later titles, driving, boat riding, and other acrobatic actions were added or developed.

The Uncharted games grant a reasonable amount of freedom through the design of the maps. Later games contain elements of open world design, in order to encourage free-roaming to secure collectibles or stealth to avoid enemies. In A Thief's End, role-playing was expanded to include side discussions with other characters. The Uncharted series follows the structure of traditional action games, where players complete a single track series of levels with linear gameplay, and is navigated through a third-person perspective.

Shooting is central to the game's function, as players are also required to bypass a string of foes. Although a wide variety of weapons are present in the game, the player can only carry a sidearm such as pistol, a primary weapon such as a rifle or shotgun, and a handful of grenades. These weapons are obtained by picking up weapons dropped by a downed foe, or from those scattered around the various maps. If the player dies, they will respawn at a specific level checkpoint.

In A Thief's End, the use of vehicles in an explorable environment was developed. It provides the player with freedom to take vehicles wherever they please, albeit, must be driven to a certain location to progress the story.

In Among Thieves, multiplayer was introduced. It features both competitive and co-operative gameplay. The co-op multiplayer mode allows up to three players to take the roles of Drake and two other "hero" companions and features missions involving gunfights, platforming, and teamwork-based objectives. Players can also assist their comrades if they become critically injured or if they are grabbed by an enemy. The competitive multiplayer allows a maximum of ten players to play against each other in two teams of five. Six competitive modes are featured, including single or team-based deathmatches, and team-based objectives. In A Thief's End, survival mode was introduced, which features wave-based progression on swarms of increasingly powerful enemies, as well as completing other objectives. Furthermore, multiplayer allows players to accrue points and rank up, which can be used to purchase more skins for both heroes and villains.

=== Setting ===
The first game, Drake's Fortune, is set off the coast of Panama, in the Amazon rainforest, and an uncharted island off the coast of South America. The second game, Among Thieves, was the first in the series to experiment with several locales. The game is set in the snow-capped mountain landscapes of the Tibetan Plateau in southernmost China, a museum in Istanbul, the jungles of Borneo, and the urban landscapes of Nepal. Subsequent games followed this concept, with Drake's Deception featuring the streets of London and Cartagena, Colombia, as well as a château in France, a castle in Syria, a city in Yemen, and the sprawling deserts of the Rub' al Khali. A Thief's End features a Panamanian jail, an estate in Italy, a cathedral in Scotland, several locations in Madagascar, and uncharted islands in the Indian Ocean near Africa to reflect Libertalia. Boston and New Orleans are also included, in both the past and present respectively, where the main character resides.

The prequel game Golden Abyss features a dig site and several other locales set in the forests of Panama, while the standalone expansion The Lost Legacy features locales set in and around the mountain ranges of Western Ghats in India, as well as a small bazaar and a city in Tamil Nadu.

Many of the featured locations were extensively researched for the series. The development team organized field research trips with tour guides and architectural historians, and captured photos and hours of video footage to properly reflect the settings.

=== Characters ===
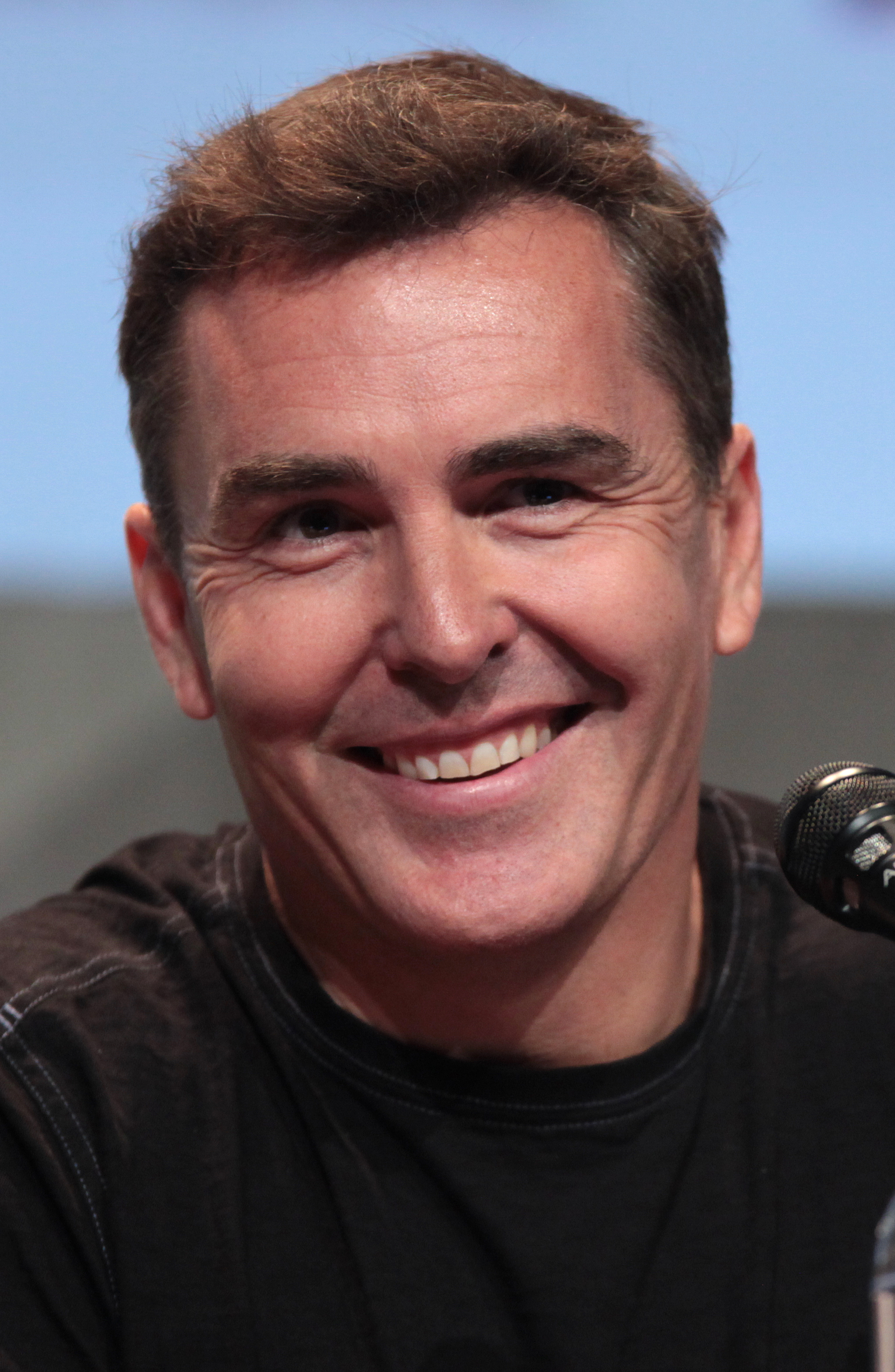
Nolan North

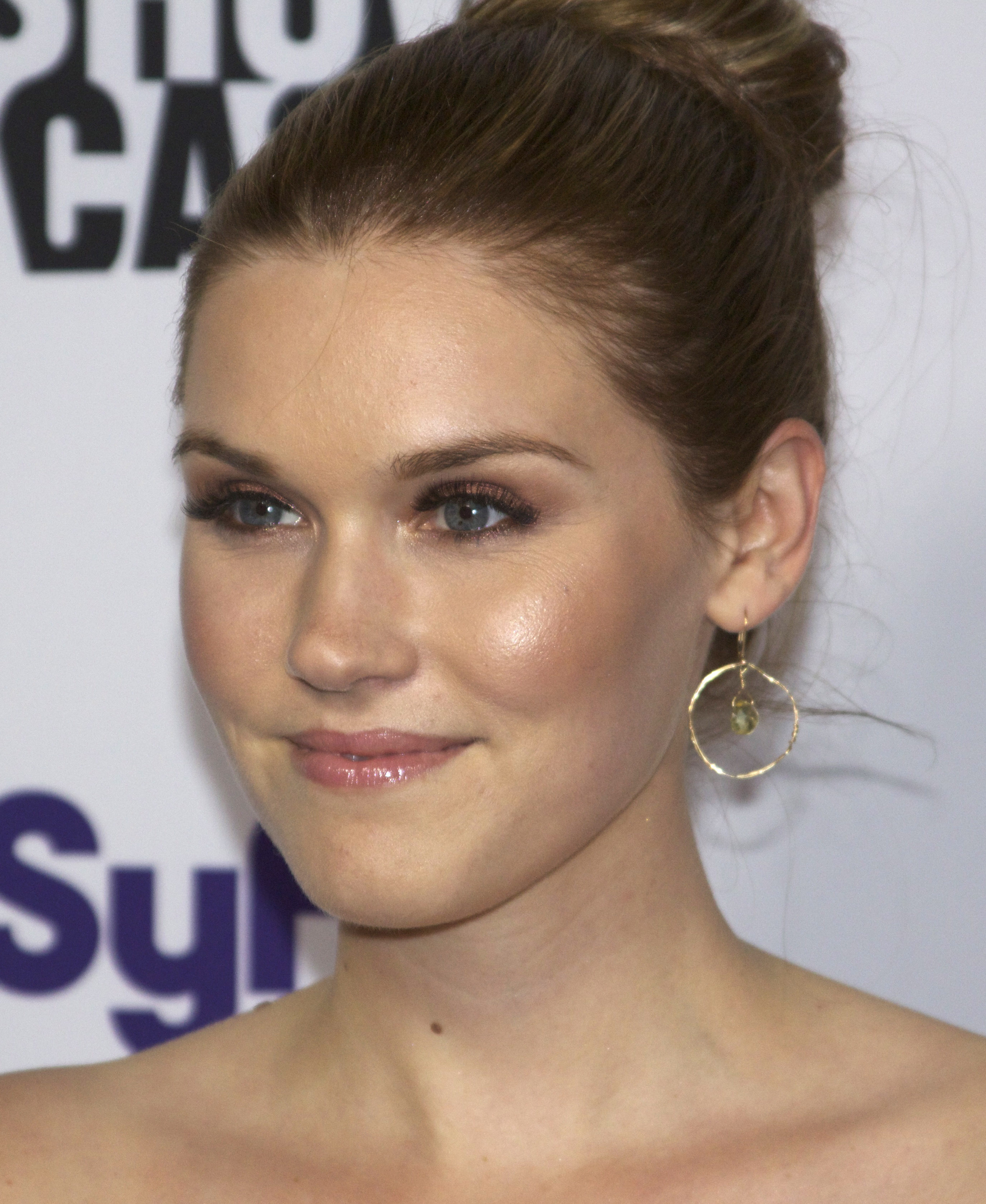
Emily Rose

North and Rose voice Nathan Drake and Elena Fisher respectively.

The series has included a wide variety of voice actors, with the development team settling on the decision that prominent characters would be voiced by lower profile actors. Only three characters have featured in every main installment, while Chloe is the only other single-player playable character:

- Nolan North as Nathan Drake

Nathan is portrayed as a professional treasure hunter with a shady background. He is physically fit, highly intelligent, self-educated in history and various languages, and a supposed descendant of Sir Francis Drake. Naughty Dog gave Drake a very strong personality, as they did not want him to act blandly, thus he often thinks out loud and comments on and complains about the absurdity of his situations. Although naturally handsome, Drake's appearance is generic and not excessively muscular, usually appearing in a plain shirt and jeans to portray the everyman persona. North also strongly mixed in his own personality with Drake's, ad-libbing portions of the character's dialogue and improvising numerous scenes.

- Emily Rose as Elena Fisher

Elena is an investigative journalist, who often finds herself on the same excursions as Drake. They begin a relationship, and eventually marry and have a child. Naughty Dog initially designed Elena solely as a sidekick and a romantic interest to Drake, and her personality to complement his. However, she grows to be as capable as Drake at gun battles and resourcefulness. Rose commented that "in the first game, she's a lot younger, she's a lot more naive, and she looks at things as being very possible, and in the second [game], has seen murders and adventure... the way that any person grows, you see that in her. She's a little bit more hesitant, a little more cynical". The games tell the story of her romantic relationship with Drake.

- Richard McGonagle as Victor Sullivan

A former U.S. Navy officer, Sullivan is a skilled traveler, able to navigate planes and submarines. He is also able to engage in similar gun battles as Drake, and is adept at star-based navigation. Sullivan is Drake's mentor and father figure, having picked him up as a wandering orphan in Colombia. Naughty Dog also designed him to fit the everyman persona, as he clads himself in odd guayabera-style shirts, khaki pants, and smokes cigars. He is also constantly in debt, and often relies on other people to fund the pair's adventures.

- Claudia Black as Chloe Frazer

The only other single-player playable character, Chloe was designed to be a darker version of the main character, and a stark contrast to Elena. She is an impulsive and reckless adventurer, and is witty, devious, and fun-seeking. Chloe is also a very sexually forward character, using it to help further her interests. At first, she appears selfish, caring little for anything but her goal, but is later seen as a very loyal and determined character. She is as skilled as Drake and Sullivan in gun battles and fights, while Black also ad-libbed segments of dialog to influence Chloe's personality.

== Other media ==
=== Games ===
==== Uncharted: The Board Game ====
Uncharted: The Board Game is a board game published by Bandai in 2012. It was designed by Hayato Kisaragi and allows between two and four players to compete for treasure and fight enemies.

=== Comics ===
==== Uncharted: Eye of Indra ====
Sony Computer Entertainment America released the first of a four-part motion comic series adventure called Uncharted: Eye of Indra on October 23, 2009. It is a prequel to Uncharted: Drake's Fortune. The second part was released on November 25, while the third and fourth parts released simultaneously on December 7.

==== Uncharted: Drake's Fortune ====
A motion comic adaptation of the prologue of Uncharted: Drake's Fortune, starting with the discovery of Francis Drake's coffin and up to the first encounter with Gabriel Roman. Uses the same voice clips from the video game.

==== Uncharted ====
An Uncharted comic book was released by DC Comics around the time Uncharted 3 came out. Written by Joshua Williamson, with art by Sergio Sandoval and covers by Adam Hughes, it was released on November 30, 2011, as part of a 6-issue mini series. In the story, a quest for the legendary "Amber Room" launches Nathan Drake on a journey to the Hollow Earth.

=== Novel ===
A novel titled Uncharted: The Fourth Labyrinth was published in October 2011. The novel is written by Christopher Golden and published by Del Rey Books, and follows the search for Daedalus's Labyrinth, a maze used to hold the Minotaur, a monster from Greek mythology.

=== Film adaptation ===
Ruben Fleischer directed a film adaptation of the games, from a script by Art Marcum and Matt Holloway. The film starred Tom Holland (who also serves as an executive producer) as Nathan Drake and Mark Wahlberg as Victor Sullivan. Antonio Banderas, Sophia Taylor Ali, and Tati Gabrielle were cast in supporting roles. It was theatrically released in the United States on February 18, 2022, produced by Columbia Pictures, Atlas Entertainment, and Arad Productions. PlayStation Productions executive produced, while Sony Pictures Releasing distributed. In August 2023, producer Charles Roven said the studio was "definitely looking to make" a sequel. Sony confirmed a sequel was in development by June 2024.

=== Fan film ===
In July 2018, director Allan Ungar posted a fan-made 15-minute short film, starring Nathan Fillion as Nathan Drake, who for years had been campaigning for the role. It was very well received, with particular praise given to Fillion's performance as Drake, and to an action sequence shot from an over-the-shoulder angle, similar to the shooting sequences in the video games. The short also features Stephen Lang as Victor Sullivan and Mircea Monroe as Elena Fisher, with appearances from Ernie Reyes Jr. and Geno Segers. The reception towards the fan film resulted in some speculation as to whether it would influence and alter the plans of the official film. Druckmann, vice-president of Naughty Dog, tweeted a heart emoji towards the fan film, with film director Shawn Levy also praising it, while Ungar expressed his support towards the official film.

=== Theme park attraction ===
A "storycoaster" ride based on the 2022 film, titled Uncharted: The Enigma of Penitence, opened at PortAventura Park on June 17, 2023.

== Reception ==
Aggregate review scores
Game	Year	Metacritic
Uncharted: Drake's Fortune	2007	88/100
Uncharted 2: Among Thieves	2009	96/100
Uncharted 3: Drake's Deception	2011	92/100
Uncharted: Golden Abyss	2011	80/100
Uncharted: Fight for Fortune	2012	67/100
Uncharted: The Nathan Drake Collection	2015	86/100
Uncharted 4: A Thief's End	2016	93/100
Uncharted: Fortune Hunter	2016	77/100
Uncharted: The Lost Legacy	2017	84/100
Uncharted: Legacy of Thieves Collection	2022	87/100

The Uncharted series has been a major success, both critically and commercially. Much of the praise for the series has gone towards the graphics Naughty Dog have produced and attained, as well as the writing and voice acting, with GamesRadar ranking it the second best franchise of the seventh generation. The Uncharted series is widely credited with bringing up Naughty Dog's reputation and has them regarded as one of the best developers in the industry.

As the protagonist of the series, Nathan Drake is seen as a PlayStation mascot, while Uncharted 2: Among Thieves is considered one of the greatest games of all time. It received over fifty Game of the Year awards, with critics heralding it as a gaming milestone. The game currently lies among the highest ever rated PlayStation 3 games on Metacritic. Uncharted 4: A Thief's End is also ranked as one of the best in the series, and among the finest video games of the eighth generation.

=== Sales ===
The first installment was a member of the PlayStation Essentials range, having shipped over 2.6 million copies worldwide. Uncharted 2 was the highest selling game in the month of its release, and by the end of their life-cycles, the games combined sold over 13 million copies by 2011. Sales for Uncharted 3 were revealed to have been over double that of its predecessor by Naughty Dog's product marketing manager Asad Quizilbash, which "far" exceeded their expectations, and the game eventually helped bring the Uncharted series to verified sales of over 17 million copies worldwide. Prior to the release of the fourth main installment, Sony revealed the Uncharted series has sold over 28 million copies worldwide.

Uncharted 4 is the best selling installment of the series to date, with over 18 million copies sold, making it one of the best-selling PlayStation 4 games of all time. As of December 2017, the series had sold 41.7 million units globally.

Sales figures for Uncharted games
Year	Game	Sales	Acquired label(s)
2007	Uncharted: Drake's Fortune	4.8 million	PS3 Greatest Hits, Essentials, The Best
2009	Uncharted 2: Among Thieves	6.5 million	PS3 Greatest Hits, Essentials, The Best
2011	Uncharted 3: Drake's Deception	~9 million	PS3 Greatest Hits, Essentials, The Best
2011	Uncharted: Golden Abyss	0.5 million+	PS Vita The Best
2012	Uncharted: Fight for Fortune		
2015	Uncharted: The Nathan Drake Collection	5.7 million	PS4 Greatest Hits, Essentials, The Best
2016	Uncharted 4: A Thief's End	18.616 million	PS4 Greatest Hits, Essentials, The Best
2016	Uncharted: Fortune Hunter		
2017	Uncharted: The Lost Legacy	5.2 million	PS4 Greatest Hits, Essentials
2022	Uncharted: Legacy of Thieves Collection	329,000	

=== Accolades ===
Uncharted: Drake's Fortune was awarded as PS3 Game of the Year by IGN.

Uncharted 2: Among Thieves received several awards during the 2009 Spike Video Game Awards (Game of the Year, Best PS3 Game, and Best Graphics) and the 2010 BAFTA Game Awards (Story, Action, Use of Audio, and Original Score). The game also won in 10 categories, including Game of the Year, at the 13th Annual Interactive Achievement Awards, and in 5 categories, including Game of the Year, at the 10th Annual Game Developers Choice Awards. It was the game that won the most GOTY awards in 2009.

Uncharted 3: Drake's Deception received several awards during the 2011 Spike Video Game Awards (Best PS3 Game and Best Graphics) and the 15th Annual Interactive Achievement Awards (Outstanding Achievement in Visual Engineering, Outstanding Achievement in Art Direction, and Outstanding Achievement in Animation). The game also was awarded in the category VideoGame Writing by Writers Guild of America Awards and in the category Best Visual Arts by Game Developers Choice Awards. It was one of the most awarded games of 2011 in the category Game of the Year.

Uncharted 4: A Thief's End received several awards during The Game Awards 2016 (Best Narrative and Best Performance) and the 20th Annual D.I.C.E. Awards (Adventure Game of the Year, Outstanding Achievement in Story, Outstanding Technical Achievement, and Outstanding Achievement in Animation). The game also won as Best Game at the 13th British Academy Games Awards, as PlayStation Game of the Year at the Golden Joystick Awards and as Best Video Game at the Empire Awards. It was the game that won the most GOTY awards in 2016.

Uncharted: The Lost Legacy won in two categories (Game, Franchise Adventure and Sound Editing in a Game Cinema) at the National Academy of Video Game Trade Reviewers Awards and in the category Best Music/Sound Design (People's Voice) at the Webby Awards.
