= Characters of the Uncharted series =

Characters in the Uncharted series

A Naughty Dog promotional illustration of a number of characters from the Uncharted series. From left to right: A guardian of Shambhala, Harry Flynn, Zoran Lazarević, Chloe Frazer, Nathan Drake, Tenzin, Smitty, Elena Fisher, Victor Sullivan, Karl Schäfer, a skeleton from the multiplayer mode, and two mercenaries.

The Uncharted series, created by video game developer Naughty Dog (with two titles developed by Bend Studio), features many characters. The series includes the video games Uncharted: Drake's Fortune, Uncharted 2: Among Thieves, Uncharted 3: Drake's Deception, Uncharted 4: A Thief's End, Uncharted: Golden Abyss, and Uncharted: The Lost Legacy, as well as a motion comic prequel, Uncharted: Eye of Indra. It primarily focuses on the exploits of treasure hunter Nathan Drake and his associates as they hunt down various mystical artifacts.

In Uncharted: Drake's Fortune, he must stop a British crime lord and his group of South American mercenaries and Southeast Asian pirates from collecting a cursed golden idol known as "El Dorado" and using it as a biological weapon. In Uncharted 2: Among Thieves, he races a homicidal Serbian war criminal, a British treasure hunter and his army of henchmen to find the powerful and mythical Cintamani Stone in Shambhala. In Uncharted 3: Drake's Deception, he competes with a British secret society, Cockney gangsters and Yemeni pirates to search for the fabled 'Iram of the Pillars', and in the prequel comic Uncharted: Eye of Indra, he works for an Indonesian crime lord in order to get the money needed to raise the coffin of his supposed relative Sir Francis Drake. In Uncharted: a Thief's End, he and his brother Samuel Drake compete with an American businessman and a South African Private Military Company to find the fabled pirate colony of Libertalia.

Nathan Drake is the primary playable character of the series. He has a shady past, in which he associated with a number of thieves and black market salesmen in order to obtain various valuable items. The development team sought to make him a generally average and likeable character. He is accompanied by a number of characters, the main ones being Elena Fisher and Victor "Sully" Sullivan. He has had two love interests in the series so far; the aforementioned Elena Fisher, a reporter and now his wife, and Chloe Frazer, another treasure hunter and an old flame, but was involved with Rika Raja in the motion comic. He is also accompanied by his longtime friend, associate, and mentor, Victor Sullivan.

A team at Naughty Dog designed the character appearances, and Amy Hennig was the main writer of their personalities and mannerisms. The voice actors were given considerable license to improvise the lines and influence character personality, and also performed the motion capture work for their characters. Many of the characters were meant to highlight different aspects of Drake's personality. Reception to the characters in the series have been fairly positive, with most commentators focusing on the believable nature of the characters and their interactions with each other. The inclusion of strong female characters has also received praise. The voice acting has also received acclaim, including two Interactive Achievement Award nominations.

== Creation and conception ==
Illustrator and designer Kory Heinzen worked on pre-visualization and concept design for many of the characters in the Uncharted series. Early on, the Naughty Dog development team drew a number of concept sketches depicting characters hanging from cliffs and handling weapons awkwardly; many of these concepts directly translated into the final character products. The more fluid character motions were improvised on a motion capture stage, and were not scripted or drawn beforehand. Amy Hennig, the series' creator and writer for the first three games, designed the characters' personalities and mannerisms. The production team sought to capture a certain tone in the character design, and closely studied the pulp adventure genre for inspiration. This included drawing characteristics from Tintin, Doc Savage, and a number of movies. They tried to contrast with other western games, which lead game designer Richard Lemarchand described as "overwrought and all a bit emo".

The game developers and animators worked closely together to ensure that the expressions and movements of the characters matched with the desired tone of the games. The character designs were kept intentionally simple, as the designers wanted character personality defined by actor performances, rather than "trinkets attached to the character model". Focus was instead placed on a realism in the animation to highlight character humanity. A blended animation system developed especially for the game allowed one character animation to begin before the previous one had ended, aiding this realism. The ultimate goal was to make the characters react as if they were real people in a realistic world. To accomplish this, many of the character reactions were conveyed through facial expressions and body language rather than explicit dialogue.

Hennig believes character emotion grew from the "production of the game as if it were a traditional movie or stage play". The two lead actors were cast because of their experience on stage and film works. The cast had a large role in developing the characters. They were allowed to ad-lib dialog and participate in revising the script. The actors also read lines together on a sound stage, allowing them to play off of one another and organically grow the character relationships. Both games used the same actors for both motion capture and voice acting. The actors did a number of read-throughs and practiced to get the motions correct before capturing.

Naughty Dog consciously avoided action game stereotypes, including super-powered heroes and overly sexualized female characters. They included a large cast of characters to ensure that the story was character-driven rather than story-driven. Co-president of Naughty Dog Evan Wells said: "I honestly think that the key element, if you really want to boil it down, is characters. People will tell a story, but if it's not a character-driven plot then you are missing something". Many of these characters were specifically designed to highlight different facets of Nathan Drake's personality.

== Main characters ==
=== Nathan "Nate" Drake ===
Nathan "Nate" Drake is the protagonist of the Uncharted series. Nolan North voices Drake, also providing motion capture for the character. North has had considerable influence in the development of the character, mixing his personality with Drake's. Drake is a playable character in five video games of the series: Uncharted: Drake's Fortune, Uncharted 2: Among Thieves, Uncharted 3: Drake's Deception, Uncharted 4: A Thief's End, and Uncharted: Golden Abyss. He is also the protagonist of the motion comic Uncharted: Eye of Indra. Nathan Fillon played Drake in the 2018 live action fan film and Tom Holland played Drake and Tiernan Jones as a young Drake in the 2022 live action film adaptation. Drake is depicted as a professional treasure hunter with a shady background involving various people from the underground illegal goods market. He is highly intelligent, self-educated in history and various languages, and a supposed descendant of Sir Francis Drake. In the first two games, he seeks a mythical treasure.

In Uncharted: Drake's Fortune, he uses the diary of Francis Drake to track the mythical El Dorado to a small island in the Pacific Ocean. He and his partner Victor Sullivan discover that El Dorado is actually a large golden statue that curses those who attempt to steal it. Drake must stop pirates led first by Gabriel Roman, and later Atoq Navarro and his mercenaries, from using the statue's power to turn people into zombies as a weapon. In the end, Drake succeeds in defeating Navarro and returns home with Sullivan and reporter Elena Fisher, who brought chests of treasure with them.

In Uncharted 2: Among Thieves, he is hired by an old friend named Harry Flynn to help him steal an oil lamp from a museum that might point to the location of Marco Polo's lost fleet. When Flynn betrays him, Drake sets out to stop the former's employer, warlord and war criminal Zoran Lazarević, from discovering the location of Shambhala and the mystical Cintamani Stone. Drake tracks him to a monastery, where he discovers the entrance to Shambhala. Lazarević locates and consumes part of the Tree of Life, but is bested in combat by Drake and killed by the guardians of Shambhala.

In Uncharted 3: Drake's Deception, Drake, Fisher, and Sullivan journey to the lost city of Ubar in order to stop the leader of the old Hermetic Order and her associates from obtaining a psychological weapon from its waters. The game also explores the relationship between Drake and Sullivan, showing their first meeting when a 15-year-old Drake tried to steal a cipher device belonging to Sir Francis Drake. In the conclusion, Drake and Sullivan escape from the ruins of the lost city, and Drake reconciles with Fisher.

In Uncharted 4: A Thief's End, a now-retired Nathan lives a happy and normal life with Elena, until his long-lost older brother Samuel, presumed dead in a prison escape, appears and pulls Nathan back into his old life by feeding him a false story of a prison breakout involving notorious drug lord Hector Alcázar. Nathan ends up embarking on a globetrotting journey to the mythical lost city of Libertalia in search of Henry Avery's lost treasure, competing with a wealthy and cruel businessman named Rafe Adler, who happens to be a former associate of the Drakes, and his associate Nadine Ross, who oversees a private military company. Against the odds, Nathan manages to kill Rafe, saves his brother, and returns home with Elena. Years later, Nathan and Elena have become famous explorers and have a teenage daughter named Cassie. When Cassie finds relics from his previous adventures, they decide to tell her their stories.

Naughty Dog gave Drake a very strong personality, as they did not want him to act blandly. He often thinks out loud, and comments and complains on the absurdity of his situations, a tendency Matt Casamassina of IGN called "lighthearted and amusing". Drake's appearance is generic, usually appearing in a plain shirt and jeans. This was to make him seem like an "ordinary guy". Throughout the series, he has various romantic interests. In the first game, there is tension between him and Elena Fisher, a reporter filming a documentary on his findings. In Uncharted 2: Among Thieves, Drake enters an affair with his crime partner Chloe Frazer. However, by the course and end of the game, he becomes involved with Fisher again, and by Uncharted 3: Drake's Deception, he has married her.

=== Elena Fisher ===
Elena Fisher is Nathan Drake's love interest and later wife (having married him in Uncharted 3: Drake's Deception). Emily Rose voices Fisher, and also acted as her motion capture performer. In Uncharted: Drake's Fortune, she can be controlled during one sequence, where she fires a grenade launcher from the back of a personal watercraft. She appears in all of the four video games in the main series: Uncharted: Drake's Fortune, Uncharted 2: Among Thieves, Uncharted 3: Drake's Deception, and Uncharted 4: A Thief's End. Mircea Monroe played Elena in the 2018 live action fan film.

Elena is a professional journalist, who first focuses on documentary work and then moves into news broadcasts. In the first video game, Uncharted: Drake's Fortune, Elena follows Drake, filming a documentary on his archaeological findings. Her network has instructed her to film him while he raises the coffin of Sir Francis Drake from the bottom of the ocean, which he locates from coordinates on a family heirloom ring he wears around his neck. After she and Drake are attacked by pirates and escape, he and Victor Sullivan abandon her to find the lost treasure of El Dorado. Despite Drake's attempts, Fisher manages to find him, but when they attempt to fly to another location, they are shot down by anti-aircraft fire. They meet up with Sullivan, who they thought had been killed. After discovering that the statue is cursed, Drake must stop Gabriel Roman and his associate Atoq Navarro from using its power, and saves Elena in the process. After doing so, Fisher, Drake, and Sullivan drive off into the sunset on a boat loaded with several crates of treasure.

In Uncharted 2: Among Thieves, Fisher happens across Drake in Nepal. She now acts as an investigative journalist; she and her cameraman Jeff are attempting to prove that war criminal Zoran Lazarević is alive, contrary to the beliefs of NATO. After Lazarević executes Jeff, she manages to escape with Drake. She goes ahead of him to a village in Tibet, where she meets Karl Schäfer, a German who had led a Schutzstaffel expedition to Shambhala. Drake and Fisher track Lazarević to a monastery, where they find the entrance to Shambhala. Once inside, they discover that the monsters Drake has been seeing in the area are guardians of the city. Lazarević apprehends them, but they escape when the guardians attack. Before he confronts Lazarević, Drake's former partner Harry Flynn almost kills Fisher with a grenade. When Lazarević is confronted, Drake defeats him and leaves the guardians to kill him while Drake makes his escape. When she recuperates, the two return to the village and begin a relationship.

Fisher returns in Uncharted 3: Drake's Deception, where it is revealed that she and Drake have married and then separated in the period between the two games. Working on a story in Yemen, she is joined by her ex-husband and Sullivan, and joins their hunt for the city of Ubar. Over the course of the adventures, Drake and Fisher reconcile and resume wearing their wedding rings.

In Uncharted 4: A Thief's End, Fisher is still married to Drake, leading a normal life with him at their home. When Drake is offered to do a profitable but illegal salvaging job by his employer, Fisher encourages him to take the job, with Drake refusing to, insisting he is 'done' with that part of his life. However, the next day, Drake lies to Fisher. Later, Fisher becomes suspicious and tracks him down, finding Drake looking for clues in Madagascar. Drake introduces Fisher to his brother, Sam, who is in debt to a drug lord. Hurt that Drake lied to her for weeks, Fisher leaves. Eventually, Fisher goes after Drake, and, with the help of Sullivan, finds him wounded on the island of the treasure's last sighting. As Fisher tends to Drake's wounds, he opens up to her about Sam and the treasure. Afterwards, Fisher aids Drake in rescuing his brother. As they search for Sam, Drake apologizes for having lied to Fisher and confesses he felt afraid that he'd drive her away if he told her the truth, and the two reconcile. When they eventually rescue Sam and leave the island, Fisher and Drake part ways with Sam and Sullivan and return home. Back home, Fisher reveals that she bought the salvage company Drake currently works at so that they can continue having more adventures, claiming to have missed that part of life much to Drake's surprise. Years later, Fisher and Drake have become well-known explorers and have a daughter named Cassandra, who they named after Drake's mother. When Cassandra discovers relics from her parents' adventures, Fisher and Drake decide to tell her about them.

Naughty Dog designed Fisher as a sidekick and a romantic interest to Drake, and her personality to complement his. She proves just as capable as Drake at gun battles and resourcefulness. Her voice actor, Emily Rose, commented that "in the first game, she's a lot younger, she's a lot more naive, and she looks at things as being very possible, and in the second (game), has seen murders and adventure...the way that any person grows, you see that in her. She's a little bit more hesitant, a little more cynical." Commentators have mentioned how unusually strong and resilient Fisher is for a female character, and GamesRadar UK called her one of the strongest heroines in video gaming.

=== Victor "Sully" Sullivan ===
Victor "Sully" Sullivan is a longtime partner and best friend of Nathan Drake and a treasure hunter as well. Sullivan has mentored Drake for some time, and is a father figure for him. Richard McGonagle voices Sullivan for all four games in the series. Stephen Lang played Sullivan in the 2018 live action fan film, and Mark Wahlberg played Sullivan in the 2022 live action film adaptation.

Sullivan first appears near the beginning of Uncharted: Drake's Fortune when he rescues Drake and Fisher from a pirate attack at sea with his seaplane. Sullivan and Drake quickly abandon Fisher, using a map found in the coffin of Francis Drake to hunt down the treasure of El Dorado. After discovering that the Spanish had removed the statue centuries before, the two come across a U-boat in the middle of the jungle. There, Gabriel Roman takes Sullivan hostage, eventually shooting him. Though presumed dead, Sullivan shows up later, and Drake must rescue him from a group of mercenaries, who are forcing him to help them find the statue. Sullivan manages to mislead his captors, allowing him and Drake to escape. The two realize that the statue is cursed, and Sullivan provides cover fire for Drake as he attempts to stop Atoq Navarro, Roman's right-hand man, from taking the statue to sell as a biological weapon. After Drake succeeds, Sullivan arrives in a boat full of several crates of treasure, and picks up Drake and Elena.

Sullivan appears briefly near the beginning of the 2009 video game Uncharted 2: Among Thieves. He first shows up to bail Drake out of jail, using the remainder of his fortune and some of his own money to bribe officials into doing so. Afterward, the two go after Zoran Lazarević in Borneo. After destroying the base there, he is not seen again until the final cutscene of the game. He also appears as a playable character in the multiplayer part of the game.

He has a major role in Uncharted 3: Drake's Deception, where he joins Nathan in the search for Ubar. Their close relationship is the main focus of the game; in flashbacks, it is revealed that Sullivan took a 15-year-old Nathan under his wing out of pity, and he was also revealed to have worked for the leader of the Hermetic Order, who he and Drake are currently fighting at the present.

He appears during the latter half of Uncharted: Golden Abyss, set before Drake's Fortune, where he helps Nathan rescue Marisa Chase.

Sullivan returns for a final time in Uncharted 4: A Thief's End, where he is revealed to have lost contact with Nate following Ubar. When Drake comes out of retirement to help his long-lost brother Sam, whose life is in danger as he is under the debt of notorious drug lord Hector Alcázar, he contacts Sullivan to aid them in searching for Henry Avery's treasure, which Alcázar demands. Sullivan and the Drake brothers face fierce competition from Rafe Adler and Nadine Ross, the latter of whom Sullivan has history with. At the end of the game, he and Sam partner up after Nate and Elena return home, and both continue to be in touch with the latter two; by the events of the epilogue, he has quit smoking.

Sullivan is a business partner of Drake's. He was meant to act not only as a partner, but as a mentor to the main character, and to provide insight into his criminal activities. In all games, Sullivan wears a guayabera-style shirt with khaki pants, and smokes cigars. He is constantly in debt, but is likable enough to convince people to invest in his ventures. In Uncharted 3: Drake's Deception, it is revealed that Sullivan used to be in the Navy, adding star-based navigation to his wide array of skills. This is also a major plot point in the game, as he is captured for his knowledge of the location of Iram of the Pillars thanks to said skill.

=== Chloe Frazer ===
Chloe Frazer is Nathan Drake's other love interest. She appears in the second video game, Uncharted 2: Among Thieves, and Uncharted 3: Drake's Deception. Claudia Black voices the character. Sophia Ali played Frazer in the 2022 live action film adaptation. Black's interactions with Drake's voice actor Nolan North played a large role in developing the character.

In Uncharted 2: Among Thieves, Frazer begins as a business associate of Drake and Harry Flynn, when a benefactor hires the group to steal an oil lamp from a Turkish museum. She and Drake had a romantic relationship sometime before the events of the game, which they covertly resume until Flynn betrays Drake and he ends up in a Turkish jail. Frazer bails him out and joins forces with Drake and Sullivan. She then begins traveling with Flynn and Lazarević, acting as a double agent, and discovers that they are after the fabled city of Shambhala and the Cintamani Stone, seeking immortality. Although her loyalty is called into question multiple times over the course of the game, she chooses to help Drake defeat Lazarević in Shambhala. Her feelings for Drake are complicated, and she voluntarily ends their relationship once she sees he is in love with Elena Fisher.

Chloe returns in Uncharted 3: Drake's Deception, working with Drake, Sullivan and Charlie Cutter, acting as a getaway driver during their initial confrontation with Katherine Marlowe's secret organization. She travels to Syria in search of the treasured city of Ubar, but drops out of the mission to tend to Cutter after he breaks his leg and can't continue.

While not appearing in Uncharted 4: A Thief's End, she is briefly mentioned at the start of the game, when Nathan reads a letter of hers stating that if Nate ever needs to return to treasure hunting, she is available.

Chloe returns in the game Uncharted: The Lost Legacy as the main protagonist, where she partners with reformed Uncharted 4 antagonist Nadine Ross and Nate's brother Sam Drake in finding the Tusk of Ganesh in India's Western Ghats. It is revealed that her father was an Indian treasure hunter who was killed by bandits while also in search of the Tusk.

Series writer Amy Hennig designed Frazer to act as a foil to Drake; as such, she acts to highlight various parts of his personality. She contrasts with other main characters, essentially being a darker version of Drake and the "bad girl" version of Fisher. Frazer is a professional thief and often acts impulsively. She looks out for herself above all other people. She is a strong female character, and is very sexually forward compared to other women in video games. Tom Cross of Gamasutra commented that she was perhaps a first in video games as a confident woman every bit the equal of the lead male character.

=== Samuel "Sam" Drake ===
Samuel "Sam" Drake is the older brother of Nathan Drake, formerly believed to have died before the events of the first game. Voiced by Troy Baker, his first appearance was in Uncharted 4: A Thief's End. A younger Sam appearing in 2 chapters of A Thief’s End was voiced by Chase Austin. Rudy Pankow played the teen Sam in the 2022 live action film adaptation.

When he and Nate were young, Samuel broke into the orphanage he was evicted from to tell Nathan of his plans to move out of town for a job. To make up, Samuel led Nathan to the house of Evelyn, a historian who was legally sold their mother's belongings. They attempted to retrieve some items, but were caught. Evelyn called the police before she found out that the boys were the sons of Cassandra Morgan, a favourite employee of hers. Evelyn collapsed from a lung disease, and the boys became associated with her death. They fled from the police, and Samuel prompted Nathan that they could become explorers under the new surname of Drake, claiming to know people who could forge new identities. It is implied that Samuel, around 19 or 20 years old, was in jail somewhere when Nathan stole Francis Drake's ring in Colombia and first met Sully, harbouring a distrust towards the latter.

Samuel supposedly died while he, Nathan, and their associate Rafe Adler attempted to find the whereabouts of Henry Avery's Gunsway haul in a Panamanian prison. Nathan and Rafe escaped, while Samuel was shot and presumed dead by the former two. In reality, he was imprisoned indefinitely after his wounds were tended to, and his existence was kept secret as punishment for Rafe having killed the corrupt warden who aided them, unbeknownst to a distraught Nathan. 15 years later, he tracks down a retired Nathan and convinces him to pick up where they left off in the search for the Gunsway haul by feeding Nathan a false breakout story. The story involves notorious drug lord Hector Alcázar, who broke Samuel free and demanded half of the treasure of the Gunsway in exchange for his life being spared. These events kick off the main story of Uncharted 4: A Thief's End. It is later revealed that Rafe released Samuel with a bribe two years prior, and that Samuel double-crossed Rafe to resume the search with Nathan.

After the events of the game, he partners with Sullivan, with whom he mended his trust issues, for a job that requires Portuguese language skills, in which Samuel is gifted.

Samuel returns in Uncharted: The Lost Legacy, with Baker reprising the role again. He is revealed to have teamed with Chloe Frazer in finding the Tusk of Ganesh prior to being kidnapped by Asav, the main antagonist of the game, leading to Chloe enlisting the help of Nadine Ross. Throughout the majority of the game, he pretends to be a Hoysala expert for Asav until he is rescued by Chloe and Nadine, the latter of whom he was initially at odds with due to their last encounter in Libertalia and the fact that he and Nathan killed most of her men; he eventually partly makes amends with her. He also states that he plans on quitting smoking, which he does eventually by the epilogue of A Thief's End alongside Sully.

In the 2022 film adaptation, Samuel and his brother Nate break into a museum in Boston to steal the map from Ferdinand Magellan's expedition, only to be caught by the museum's security guards and arrested. Sam is kicked out of the orphanage after receiving a third strike for breaking into the museum, forcing him to run away and separating him from Nate. Sam promises Nate that he will return before handing him a ring belonging to their ancestor Sir Francis Drake, with the inscription "sic parvis magna" ("greatness from small beginnings"). Sam is mentioned multiple times throughout the film, with Nate indicating that they have kept in touch once in a while before Sam mysteriously vanished. It is later revealed that Sam went on a mission with Victor Sullivan to retrieve Juan Sebastian Elcano's diary only to be ambushed by Braddock and her forces, resulting in Sam being shot and presumably killed. However, a mid-credit scene shows that Sam is alive but is being held in prison, where he is writing another postcard to his brother Nate.

=== Nadine Ross ===
Nadine Ross first appears as the secondary antagonist in Uncharted 4: A Thief's End. She is voiced and motion-captured by Laura Bailey.

During the events of A Thief's End, she is the leader of the South African private military company Shoreline, and forms a partnership with Rafe Adler in finding Henry Avery's lost treasure. They attempt to buy a St. Dismas Cross at a black market auction in Italy, where she sees Victor Sullivan, with whom she is acquainted. When they fail to acquire the cross due to interference from Nathan Drake, Ross confronts him elsewhere and the two briefly fight, but Nathan escapes with the cross. Adler hacks into Nathan and Samuel's phones, using their GPS to track them to Madagascar. Along the way, Ross slowly loses patience with Adler, citing the loss of her troops for something that they may not find, and advocates numerous times for Adler to kill the Drakes, which he refuses to do. In the game's climax, Ross and Adler succeed in pillaging a portion of Avery's treasure. Ross is content with leaving afterwards, unwilling to risk falling into Avery's traps aboard the ship, and is even willing to let Samuel and Nathan keep the rest if they can avoid the traps, though Adler coerces her into aiding him by turning her men against her. Aboard the ship, however, a trap is sprung by Samuel himself and the ship begins to sink. Finally fed up of Adler's greed and grudges, Ross betrays Adler and at gunpoint abandons him to die aboard the ship with Nathan and Samuel, while she escapes with the rest of her men.

Nadine returns in Uncharted: The Lost Legacy after agreeing to partner with Chloe Frazer in helping her find the Tusk of Ganesh in the mountains of India. It is revealed she has left Shoreline following her dispute with Rafe and subsequent betrayal by her lieutenant Orca, although she plans to retake the company once she fulfills her commitment with Frazer. She later finds out Samuel Drake, her former enemy, is also partnered with Frazer, and though initially at odds with him, eventually begins to put her grudge aside and works with him to stop Asav. After finally catching up with Asav, she discovers that Shoreline, now led by Orca, have resorted to working with the insurgent leader by agreeing to offer him munitions in exchange for the Tusk. After helping Chloe force Orca from his helicopter, she remonstrates him for associating with Asav, before shooting him dead in return fire whilst she is saved by Sam. After helping defeat Asav, she tells Chloe and Samuel that she has finally moved on from retaking Shoreline and instead plans to pursue further work in fortune hunting, hinting at more adventures alongside Chloe.

=== Charlie Cutter ===
Charlie Cutter first appears in Uncharted 3: Drake's Deception. He is a cockney friend of Nate, Sully and Chloe and is also shown to know Elena to some extent when she inquires about his well-being. It is apparent that he suffers from severe claustrophobia, requiring much prompting to squeeze through tight spaces. He is first introduced as one of Marlowe's henchmen, although it is soon apparent that he is an inside man. He helps Drake, Frazer, and Sullivan in the first part of the game with finding the clues to the location of Ubar, the Atlantis of the Sands. He is injured when jumping off a tower in Syria and tells Drake to go on and stop Marlowe out of revenge. Despite looking like a blunt, common thug, he appears to be well-educated, quoting John Steinbeck's Of Mice and Men and correcting Sullivan's mistake when quoting Macbeth. He is voiced by and modeled after Graham McTavish, who previously voiced Lazarević in the second game. Cutter does not appear in Uncharted 4: A Thief's End, although he is mentioned by Drake as a trusted associate when he initially tries to decline his brother Sam's request for help.

According to Naughty Dog, Cutter was originally supposed to remain by the protagonists' side until the final battle with Katherine Marlowe and Talbot, but McTavish was forced to drop out in order to fly to New Zealand after landing a role in The Hobbit. Cutter's role was therefore reduced to only the first half of the game.

=== Rika Raja ===
Rika Raja appears in the motion comic Uncharted: Eye of Indra. While she never appears in any of the single-player campaign games, she can be purchased as a skin for the Uncharted 2: Among Thieves multiplayer mode. She is voiced by Gwendoline Yeo in the motion comics. Rika saves Nathan's life from two thugs that get in a fight with him in her bar. She then decides to help Drake on his mission to steal the Eye of Indra from Daniel Pinkerton. She double-crosses Nathan as well as her older brother Eddy, leaving with the Eye of Indra.

=== Marisa Chase ===
Marisa Chase appears only in Uncharted: Golden Abyss, where she is voiced by Christine Lakin. Marisa is the granddaughter of deceased archaeologist Vincent Perez. She carries a golden amulet, which was very important to her grandfather. She lived her youth with Perez because her parents were shot when she was very young. Marisa, just like Drake, acquired climbing and treasure hunting skills and knowledge of ancient artifacts by the age of 15. She has a problem trusting people who she doesn't know, and exceptions are displayed through her use of the word "partner" to refer to close allies. Her biggest difference from Elena is that she never uses a gun, even when she is getting shot at, except near the end of the game. She survives an RPG shot from antagonist Roberto Guerro during the events of the game.

== Antagonists ==
=== Atoq Navarro ===
Atoq Navarro is a Peruvian archaeologist and the main antagonist of Uncharted: Drake's Fortune, voiced and motion captured by Robin Atkin Downes.

At first, he is the lieutenant of Gabriel Roman, and helps him hold Sullivan and Drake hostage. He also leads a team of highly trained South American mercenaries hired by Roman.

Though never made into a chapter, there was a drafted sequence where Drake and Fisher attempt to sneak into an airship to get to an island in search of El Dorado, but the area is infested by Navarro's mercenaries. After the two kill the mercenaries, Navarro appears in an armored truck and fires at them with a machine gun. Drake knocks a telephone pole onto his truck using explosive barrels and escapes on a plane with Fisher. Sometime later, Navarro and Roman travel to the island so Roman can find and sell El Dorado to recoup a debt owed by Sullivan (whom they took with them when Drake thought he was dead), unaware that Navarro has his own plan of selling it. Eventually, they team up with Eddy Raja, who is also searching for the statue of El Dorado, and try to keep Nathan away from it.

In the game, when Roman finds the statue, Navarro reveals his premeditated intention to double-cross him. He convinces Roman to open the statue, fully aware it is actually a sarcophagus containing an infected mummy, and of the zombification effects the pathogen it contains will have on Roman; after he becomes infected, Navarro kills him with a gunshot to the head. It turns out Navarro plans to sell the virus as a biological weapon to the highest bidder. After he leaves holding Fisher at gunpoint, the statue is airlifted by his helicopter. However, the zombified Spaniards of the island, known as "Descendants", invade the chamber, attacking his mercenaries. Drake manages to jump onto the airlifted statue. A mercenary notices Drake and shoots at him from above, but Fisher kicks him out of the helicopter, causing him to instead shoot the pilot, sending the helicopter crashing onto Navarro's boat. An unarmed Nathan fights Navarro, who is armed with a laser sight-equipped SPAS-12. After the fight, Nathan pushes the crashed helicopter into the ocean, with the rope used to airlift the statue wrapping around Navarro's ankle and dragging him into the water.

=== Gabriel Roman ===
Gabriel Roman is the secondary antagonist of Uncharted: Drake's Fortune, though he is built up to be the main villain until the game's climax. He is voiced by Simon Templeman.

Roman first arrives while Drake and Sullivan are exploring the wreckage of a Kriegsmarine U-boat beached in the Amazon rainforest. Roman, client of a group of pirates and mercenaries, had loaned Sullivan a large sum of money in the past. Sullivan had assured him that he would soon find "something big", and then have the money to pay Roman back. Roman, however, decides to steal the information that Drake and Sullivan have gathered and find the treasure for himself. To force Drake into compliance, Roman holds Sullivan hostage, and eventually shoots him, nearly fatally. Roman discovers the directions to El Dorado, but fails to capture Fisher and Drake.

Roman forces Sullivan to work with him in finding the treasure. Despite numerous warnings that the treasure and the island are haunted, Roman continues to use his men in search of the treasure. Roman captures Fisher, but Drake and Sullivan catch up to him, just in time to see Roman about to leave with the statue. However, Navarro tells Roman the real treasure is inside the statue. Roman opens the statue to collect the riches inside, but is met with a mummy infected with an airborne mutagenic virus. He slams it shut, but not before becoming infected. An angered and rapidly turning Roman charges towards Navarro, who shoots Roman in the head and reveals to Drake that he intended to sell the statue as a weapon the whole time. Roman is mentioned in the Uncharted film.

=== Eddy Raja ===
Eddy Raja, voiced by James Sie, is an old rival of Nathan Drake and the leader of a group of Southeast Asian pirates.

Raja first met Drake before the events of Uncharted: Eye of Indra, where they worked together on a job. Drake double-crosses him, however, and Eddy continues to hold a grudge. Raja again encounters Drake during Eye of Indra, where Drake enlists his help in stealing the valuable Eye of Indra from Daniel Pinkerton.

In Drake's Fortune, Eddy and his gang of pirates are hired by Gabriel Roman. Raja helps Roman capture Drake, though he and Fisher escape. After large numbers of his men begin mysteriously dying, Raja becomes convinced that the island is cursed, and tries to convince Roman to stop looking for the treasure. When he does so, Roman accuses him of cowardice and fires him; Raja pulls a gun on Roman, but is stopped by Navarro. Raja is next seen looking for the treasure himself, and tries to have Drake killed one last time by sending the last of his men after him and Fisher. When Drake and Fisher find the room where El Dorado is supposedly located, they are followed by Raja and his last surviving pirate, running from a large number of cursed zombie-like Spaniards. He and Drake briefly work together to fight the creatures while Elena tries to find a way out for them. During the battle, Raja takes his opportunity to tell Drake how much he hates him, though it may also be his way of admitting that despite their animosity, he always held a begrudging respect for Drake. Eventually, Raja is dragged down a hole by one of the so-called "Descendants" after being bitten, and is presumed dead. His famous line is "Don't mess with Eddy Raja!"

=== Zoran Lazarević ===
Zoran Lazarević is the main antagonist of Uncharted 2: Among Thieves. He is voiced by Graham McTavish. He is a ruthless Serbian war criminal who is believed to have died after a bombing raid by NATO aircraft, but he had survived with half of his face scarred. He uses a double-barreled shotgun as his main weapon. Lazarević leads a militia of mercenaries who act as his henchmen, he is also the employer of British treasure hunter Harry Flynn.

Lazarević pays Flynn to betray Drake, tricking him into giving Flynn information on the location of Marco Polo's lost fleet and causing Drake's arrest. In reality, Lazarević wants to possess the mythical Cintamani Stone, which the fleet was supposedly transporting. After discovering that the fleet never had the stone, he dispatches a group of mercenaries to Nepal for clues to the location of the legendary city of Shambhala. He incites a civil war in the region to aid in his search and distract from any possible discoveries. In Nepal, Lazarević personally executes Fisher's cameraman Jeff, and follows Drake after he discovers the location of Shambhala's entrance. Lazarević invades the small Tibetan village harboring Drake and Fisher, seeking the key to reveal Shambhala. He kidnaps village resident Karl Schäfer and forces him to reveal the general area of the entrance. When Drake and Fisher follow, Lazarević apprehends them and forces Drake to reveal the entrance to Shambhala. There, he drinks the sap of the Tree of Life. He battles Drake with his newfound powers, but is defeated by Drake and beaten by the guardians of Shambhala, supposedly being killed when the temple falls apart.

Lazarević appears later along with Harry Flynn and Eddy Raja in the online co-op story in Uncharted 3. Lazarević was originally meant to be portrayed by Jonathan Banks, but the role ultimately went to McTavish.

=== Harry Flynn ===
Harry Flynn is a longtime business associate of Drake's and the secondary antagonist of Uncharted 2: Among Thieves. He is voiced by Steve Valentine.

In the second game, he approaches Drake, convincing him to help steal an oil lamp from a Turkish museum for a wealthy client. The two, along with Frazer, plan to keep the lamp for themselves, believing it will lead to the location of Marco Polo's lost fleet and the treasures it holds. In reality, Flynn is working for Lazarević and betrays Drake, taking the location coordinates from the lamp and landing Drake in prison. He then works with Lazarević in searching for the Chintamani Stone. When Lazarević apprehends Drake, he has Flynn force him to find the location of the entrance to Shambhala. There, Lazarević and his men, Flynn, Drake and company are attacked by the Guardians, where Flynn is gravely wounded due to a gunshot wound from Lazarević, his employer having grown tired of his failures. Flynn ultimately commits suicide with a grenade while attempting to blow up Drake, but severely wounds Fisher instead.

Naughty Dog used the dialogue in the game to hint at the relationship between Drake and Flynn, but desired ambiguity regarding the exact nature of their past dealings, and to show what Drake could have become. Flynn mainly served to hint at a darker past where Drake was less heroic. Flynn was not written as a British character; the casting of a British actor was mere coincidence. In the early stages of casting, Graham McTavish was Naughty Dog's first choice for Flynn. However, Valentine's audition caused them to reconsider and McTavish was instead given the role of Lazarević.

=== Lt. Draza ===
Lieutenant Draza is Zoran Lazarević's right-hand man and an antagonist of Uncharted 2: Among Thieves. He is voiced by Michael Benyaer in Uncharted 2 and by Fred Tatasciore in Uncharted 3's multiplayer mode. According to some articles, Draza and Lazarević have known each other for a long time. He uses an M4 carbine (which's actually a Colt Model 653 in the game) as his main weapon.

Draza is first seen with Lazarević in Nepal, when they first meet Nathan face to face. Lazarević gives him the Phurba from Nate. Later, when Chloe is taken onto Lazarević's train by Flynn, Nathan tries to save her, but runs into Draza, who is in charge of the train. The two fight until Drake knocks out Draza and takes back the Phurba. Draza wakes up and tries to strangle Drake, but is shot dead from behind by Chloe.

=== Daniel Pinkerton ===
Daniel Pinkerton is the main antagonist of the Uncharted: Eye of Indra motion comic. Fred Tatasciore provides his voice.

Pinkerton is an American crime boss who later immigrated to Indonesia. Pinkerton hires Drake, who seeks the funds to raise the coffin of Sir Francis Drake, to find the valuable Eye of Indra. After discovering that Pinkerton has unknowingly had the Eye in his safe the whole time, Drake attempts to retrieve it by raiding Pinkerton's home. Pinkerton captures Drake and tortures him when he refuses to reveal the treasure's location. When Drake eventually reveals the location of the Eye of Indra, Rika Raja shoots and kills Pinkerton, and the two take the Eye of Indra for themselves.

=== Katherine Marlowe ===
Katherine Marlowe is the main antagonist of Uncharted 3: Drake's Deception. Marlowe is voiced by Rosalind Ayres and appears to be modelled after actress Helen Mirren.

She is the coldly calculating leader of a British secret society whose roots date back over four hundred years to the court of Queen Elizabeth I. She has a long-standing rivalry with Nathan Drake over Sir Francis Drake's ring – something they both contend is rightfully theirs and is also the key to an ancient mystery. Katherine Marlowe is a much more cerebral enemy than Drake has confronted in the past, using both psychological and physical tactics to get what she is after. Marlowe also has the assistance of a team of highly trained agents, who are far more elusive and dangerous than the Cockney gangsters Nathan Drake and Victor Sullivan have faced before. She treats her subordinates with slight disdain, being annoyed with Talbot for hiring Charlie Cutter. Marlowe appears to have studied Nathan's past and reveals that he's not actually a direct descendant of Sir Francis Drake; he was merely in an orphanage named after the great explorer. She first meets a teenage Drake in Colombia, forcing him to give her the cipher disk he had just stolen from a museum to her, but fails to get Sir Francis Drake's ring when he runs off. Twenty years later, she meets with Drake in an alleyway and steals the ring, but discovers it's a fake and promptly loses both the disc and the ring when Drake takes both. Marlowe then sends Talbot and her agents to France and Syria, successfully getting the clues to the location of Ubar. She then captures Nathan and Sullivan and leaves for the lost city. Nathan eventually finds her using a winch to drag out King Solomon's hallucinogenic talisman from a lake in Ubar, and destroys the foundations of the city, causing Marlowe to fall into a pool of quicksand. Though Drake attempts to save her, Marlowe submerges and dies, taking Sir Francis's ring with her.

In 2013, Liz Lanier of Game Informer included Marlowe among top ten female villains in video games, stating that "Marlowe is the definition of a power lady. She runs the Hermetic Order, a secret organization that will do anything to find the Atlantis of the Sands. Marlowe will still take any opportunity to belittle Drake and others that get in her way on a personal level on top of taking violent action".

=== Talbot ===
Talbot is Marlowe's right-hand man and the secondary antagonist of Uncharted 3: Drake's Deception. He is voiced by Robin Atkin Downes.

He is the one who hired Charlie Cutter to provide security for the deal in the first level. He has an intense rivalry with Nathan Drake and, according to the developers, acts as the "anti-Drake", with similar looks and freerunning skills to rival Drake's own. Talbot is always by Marlowe's side, and later orders Cutter to shoot Nathan and Sullivan. Despite his unassuming appearance, he is an extremely dangerous hand-to-hand combatant, able to use a combat knife with high proficiency (as seen in his final confrontation with Drake and Sullivan in the collapsing city of Ubar). He also has a special weapon: a dart gun loaded with a special drug which grants him a degree of hypnotic influence over people (he uses it to make Cutter disarm himself). Despite being treated with near indifference, he appears to care deeply for Marlowe, begging Drake to save her from being consumed by the quicksand in Ubar and being driven mad when Drake fails. He tries to murder Drake on top of a collapsing cliff overlooking Ubar, but is briefly distracted by Sullivan, who shoots him in the shoulder with a Walther P99. He is then finally killed by Drake, who shoots him in the head before he can crush Sullivan's skull with a rock, leading him to plummet to his death.

He is an expert at mind control and seems capable of appearing and disappearing almost at will and surviving being shot at point blank. However, due to his mind tricks, it is difficult to tell for sure if he can appear out of nowhere or disappear at will and sustain much bullet damage. After brainwashing Cutter, he manages to vanish before the rest of the team arrive. Cutter shoots him at point blank, but he does not appear to suffer much from it. He manages to attack Sullivan by surprise on a walkway with no place to sneak behind him. He manages to catch up with Drake and Sullivan when the whole city collapses, which is either possible thanks to his freerunning abilities or his unexplained ability to appear and disappear almost at will.

=== Rameses ===
Rameses, voiced by Sayed Badreya, is an antagonist of Uncharted 3: Drake's Deception.

Shortly after Drake is knocked out by Rameses, he is taken to a shipyard where he is tied to a chair. Rameses demands Drake to tell him where the Atlantis of the Sands is located, not believing that Drake genuinely does not know and threatening to interrogate Sullivan. After Drake manages to break free and defeat all of the guards, he climbs onto Rameses' cruise ship. He finds a decoy of Sullivan and realizes that he was never there to begin with. Rameses tells him that he lied – he is, after all, a pirate. Drake then shoots him, critically wounding him, and the ship begins to capsize. With the ship on its side, Rameses shoots the glass roof of the ballroom in a murder–suicide attempt; although he is killed, Drake survives by drifting to shore on a piece of flotsam.

=== Roberto Guerro ===
Roberto Guerro is the main antagonist of Uncharted: Golden Abyss, voiced and motion-captured by JB Blanc.

A decade before Golden Abyss, Roberto Guerro was the military dictator of Panama before being overthrown by a coup d'état. He escaped execution by the new regime and, accompanied by loyalists, formed a revolutionary guerilla army to hound government forces and eventually regain power. However, Guerro quickly realised that without a good source of funds, he would be unable to compete with the military strength of the new government, so he indulged in abductions and drug running to build up the cash.

Shortly before Golden Abyss, Guerro had enough money to equip his army with guns, turrets, vehicles and explosives, but still needed more. He was approached by archaeologist Vincent Perez and his partner Jason Dante, who wished to investigate ruins within Guerro's territory on a potential lead to Quivira, one of the Seven Cities of Gold. Guerro agreed, presumably planning to kill both Perez and Dante when he had the gold, which he would use to fund the revolution. After Perez's disappearance, he allowed Dante to take over the excavation only if he complied with orders. Guerro interrogates both Chase and Dante after he captures Drake. Chase manages to escape with Drake and her amulet. Guerro captures Chase and steals the sword of Stephen from Drake. Drake and Sullivan find the Serpent Temple where Dante's mercenaries and Guerro's rebels are fighting. Guerro critically wounds Chase with an RPG before being thrown off a bridge by Nate.

=== Jason Dante ===
Jason Dante is an old friend of Drake's who halfway helps him find a lost city of Spaniards, and an antagonist of Uncharted: Golden Abyss. He is voiced by Jason Spisak.

He has a rivalry with Marisa Chase, and after he betrays Drake, the latter teams up with Marisa to stop Dante and his band of mercenaries. A Geiger counter in Chase's pack indicates that the gold in the Throne of Gold is radioactive. Dante arrives and reveals he knew about the treasure being radioactive, planning to strip-mine Quivira and litter the gold through the black market. Nathan and Dante get into an intense fistfight, with Nathan coming out on top. Nathan and Chase leave Dante by the Throne of Gold after he refuses Nate's offer to leave with him and Chase. Chase then detonates the bombs in the caverns to seal it. As she and Nathan flee, the caverns begin to collapse, killing Dante and any of his mercenaries still in the cave system. Dante was known for his greed, even while he and Nathan were friends, and it becomes his undoing.

=== Rafe Adler ===
Rafe Adler is the main antagonist in Uncharted 4: A Thief's End. He is voiced and motion-captured by Warren Kole.

Adler is a wealthy American businessman and treasure hunter as well as an old acquaintance of the Drake brothers, working with them by infiltrating a Panamanian prison to find clues regarding the whereabouts of legendary pirate Henry Avery's lost fortune. When Vargas, the corrupt prison warden who was bribed into aiding the trio, demands a share of the treasure, Adler kills him, and they attempt to escape the prison pursued by guards. Sam is apparently killed in the ensuing shootout and Nate, after briefly working with Adler following the escape, eventually loses interest in finding the treasure, forcing Adler to continue alone.

Thirteen years later, Adler enlists the help of Nadine Ross and her private military company Shoreline to aid in finding the treasure. Adler also discovers that Sam survived and arranges for his release from prison to enlist his aid as well, but Sam defects and approaches a now retired Nathan, leaving an enraged Adler to search himself. He comes into contact with the protagonists at an auction in Italy, subtly warning Victor Sullivan to stay out of his way, though he fails to obtain the St. Dismas Cross when it is stolen by Sam and Nate. Adler, however, hacks into their phones and uses their GPS to track them to King's Bay, Madagascar, where he again tries to force Nate to walk away in exchange for being spared to no avail. Later, on the island where Libertalia is located, he reveals to Nate that he had Sam released two years ago. After a brief scuffle, Adler forces Sam to lead him to the treasure, though Sam manages to escape. Adler and Ross eventually reach Avery's ship, though Ross has lost patience with Adler, which is further exacerbated when he seemingly almost let her die during the scuffle with Sam, and demands that she and her men leave with a portion of the loot, fearing that Avery's ship is rigged with traps. Adler refuses and turns Ross's men against her to coerce her into helping him. Inside the ship, however, a trap is sprung and Adler confronts Nate and an injured Sam inside the brig. Ross abandons Adler to die with Nate. In his rage, Adler grabs a sword and duels Nathan, and though he has the upper hand, Nathan unloads a net of heavy treasure onto Adler, crushing and killing him.

=== Hector Alcázar ===
Hector Alcázar is a Panamnian drug lord and the false main antagonist in Uncharted 4: A Thief's End. He is voiced and motion-captured by Robin Atkin Downes. Initially, Samuel told Nathan that Alcázar was his cellmate, and Alcázar's men helped break the both of them out of the Panamanian Prison. In exchange, Alcázar gives Samuel three months to find Avery's treasure. However, it was later revealed that Alcázar was killed in a shootout in Argentina six months prior to the current events of Uncharted 4, and Sam's story was a lie to get Nathan to help him find the treasure before Adler and Ross.

=== Vargas ===
Vargas, voiced by Hemky Madera, is a minor antagonist in Uncharted 4: A Thief's End. He is a corrupt prison warden who first appears in a flashback prior to the events of the present day, where he is bribed into helping the Drake brothers and Rafe in finding Avery's treasure in a Panamanian prison. He is later killed by Rafe when he troubles the treasure hunters by trying to get a cut of their treasure, though not before alerting the guards with gunfire. His death is the reason why Sam spends thirteen years in prison after he was shot during their escape.

=== Gustavo ===
Gustavo, voiced by Alejandro Edda, is a minor antagonist in Uncharted 4: A Thief's End, where he appears fighting Nathan in prison. He and his gang later ambush Nathan, Samuel and Rafe after they examine a St. Dismas Cross which Nathan found. He is however interrupted by the prison guards and subdued by Vargas, who was bribed by the treasure hunters to protect them from being harmed by other inmates.

=== Knot ===
Knot, voiced by JB Blanc is a member of Shoreline and an antagonist in Uncharted 4: A Thief's End and is one Ross's most-trusted lieutenant, along with Orca.

He is seen with Nadine Ross when everyone is in Scotland trying to dig up whatever they can find about Henry Avery's treasure. Nadine sends him out with some other men of Shoreline to find anything they can on all sides of the area.

Near the end of the game, they all manage to reach Avery's ship, and we see Knot on a boat placing boxes of small parts of Avery's treasure in the boat. When Rafe Adler and Nadine Ross begin arguing over whether to go for the treasure or not, after Rafe is knocked over, he and Orca hold Nadine at gunpoint, taking Rafe's side that they should go get the treasure before Sam gets it after he stole their second boat. He then drives the boat to get them all to Avery's ship. As they get on Avery's ship, they're all caught by Sam in a fight, and Nate sees an explosion go off while he's outside the boat and when he gets on board, he finds Knot killed by that explosion from Sam.

=== Orca ===
Orca, voiced by Gideon Emery, is a private military contractor employed by the private military company Shoreline.

During Uncharted 4: A Thief's End, he is a lieutenant under the command of Nadine Ross. After their client Rafe Adler finds Captain Avery's treasure on-board his booby-trapped pirate ship, a bribed Orca draws his gun on Ross after she protests Adler on risking further danger in boarding the ship, betraying her command.

Orca later appears in Uncharted: The Lost Legacy, taking command of Shoreline after Ross departs from the company, and has struck a deal with the Indian insurgents headed by Asav. He purchases the Tusk of Ganesh from Asav with a bomb that the insurgent leader (Asav) plans to detonate in a nearby city to ignite a revolution. Orca is later attacked by Ross and her associate Chloe Frazer inside his helicopter before it crashes to the ground, severely injuring him. After implying that he sold a bomb to Asav and gave up the Tusk, he quickly tries to shoot Ross, but is killed in return fire after she is saved by Samuel Drake.

=== Asav ===
Asav, voiced by Usman Ally, is the main antagonist of Uncharted: The Lost Legacy.

The head of a group of Indian insurgents, he competes with Chloe and Nadine in finding the Tusk of Ganesh in India, and has captured Samuel Drake and used him as a Hoysala expert until Frazer and Ross rescue him. He manages to capture both Frazer and Ross within the hidden city of Belur, and threatens to kill Ross and Drake to force Frazer to solve a puzzle that will reveal the Tusk. After taking the Tusk, he leaves a handcuffed Frazer, Ross, and Drake to drown in the Tusk's chamber, which fills with water as Asav and his men make their escape. He is revealed to have Shoreline, Nadine's former private military company, working with him, and later sells them the Tusk in exchange for a bomb that he plans to detonate on a train heading towards a nearby city. He goes insane at the end of the game after his plans of sparking a civil war become compromised by Frazer, Ross and Drake's efforts in stopping the train from reaching the city. After making one last stand in challenging Frazer and Ross to a melee, Asav gets his leg caught underneath the bomb as the out-of-control train is headed towards a collapsed bridge. After Frazer and Ross leave, the train falls off into the valley below and explodes, killing Asav.

=== Jo Braddock ===
Jo Braddock, portrayed by Tati Gabrielle, is the true main antagonist of the 2022 film adaptation. She is the leader of a group of mercenaries hired by Santiago Moncada, who she kills to both gain power and keep the treasure to herself. She is crushed to death by a falling ship after Sullivan knocks her off of his and Drake's helicopter.

=== Santiago Moncada ===
Santiago Moncada, portrayed by Antonio Banderas, is the secondary antagonist and false main antagonist of the 2022 film adaptation. He is a Spanish nobleman and billionaire and the last descendant of the Moncada family that funded the Magellan expedition, and seeks to finish it himself. He hires mercenaries led by Braddock to find the treasure, but is killed when Braddock slits his throat.

== Supporting characters ==
=== Karl Schäfer ===
Karl Schäfer is first introduced when the player arrives in a remote town in the mountains of Tibet in Uncharted 2: Among Thieves. He is voiced by René Auberjonois.

At the time of his appearance, he has been living in the village for 70 years. During World War II, he had led an Ahnenerbe expedition to find the entrance of Shambhala. However, afraid of what the Nazis would do with the power found in the Cintamani Stone, Schäfer shot and killed all of the members of the expedition but himself. When he and Drake first meet, Schäfer sends Drake to look for the Cintamani Stone after explaining what it can do. While he is gone, Lazarević invades the village and kidnaps Schäfer, interrogating him for the whereabouts of the entrance to Shambhala. Schäfer dies of his wounds following his capture, begging Nathan and Elena to stop Lazarević and Flynn and destroy the stone at all costs.

His namesake is Ernst Schäfer, a German explorer who led the 1938-1939 German expedition to Tibet.

=== Tenzin ===
Tenzin is the leader of a remote Tibetan village in the Himalayas in Uncharted 2: Among Thieves. He is voiced by Pema Dhondup, with Robin Atkin Downes responsible for his motion capture work.

When Drake first wakes up, Tenzin leads him to Fisher and Schäfer. He is a Sherpa guide who leads Drake through the mountain passes surrounding the area. There, he helps Drake through various challenges that require more than one person to pass. Despite acting as a guide, Tenzin cannot speak any English. After returning, Drake and Tenzin find that the village has come under attack by Lazarević.

The character was named in honor of sherpa Tenzing Norgay. The developers felt that the sequences involving Tenzin leading Drake through the cave systems and then seeing his village burning would create an emotionally moving experience for the player. Tenzin has a daughter named Pema. He briefly appears in a photo in Uncharted 4: A Thief's End, where Drake muses that he misses Tenzin.

=== Jeff Wynia ===
Jeff Wynia first appears in Uncharted 2: Among Thieves, being voiced by Gregory Myhre. He is Elena Fisher's cameraman.

Wynia accompanies Fisher to Nepal to prove that Lazarević was alive, running into Drake and Frazer. They then team up to find Shambhala. After Drake and Frazer investigate a temple with clues as to where the location of Shambala is, they return to find Wynis injured by a bullet wound to the abdomen. Drake, escorted by Frazer and Fisher, tries to carry Wynia to safety, but they are caught and Lazarević executes Wynia in front of Drake and Fisher.

=== Salim ===
Salim appears in Uncharted 3: Drake's Deception. He is voiced by TJ Ramini.

After Drake defeats Marlowe's henchmen in a ghost town in the Rub' al Khali, Salim, a Bedouin sheikh, arrives on horseback and helps him escape. After Drake is rescued, Salim tells him that the Atlantis of the Sands is a dangerous place and that Marlowe cannot be allowed to enter because of the evil within. Drake believes that she could use these powers to control others through fear, realising it was not treasure they were after. When Sullivan is rescued, Salim brings both of them to the open desert where the Atlantis of the Sands is located. Salim heads off and gets separated from Drake and Sullivan because of the heavy sandstorm. After Talbot is defeated and the Atlantis of the Sands collapse, Salim appears in time to save them.

=== Cathrine ===
Cathrine is a nun that appears in a flashback in Uncharted 4: A Thief's End. She is voiced by Merle Dandridge. She is the foster mother of Nate and Sam after Cassandra Morgan's death.

She is seen reprimanding a young Nate for attacking other children after a book of his was stolen, placing the blame solely on him. When she leaves, Nate sneaks out to see his brother Sam. While outside Nate's room, we see her speaking to a priest of the Saint Francis' Boy's Home about giving up on keeping Nate with them. But she never sees Nate out of the room. And so, Nate is able to get to Sam. The priest calls her "Sister Cathrine".

=== Jameson ===
Jameson (first name unknown) appears in Uncharted 4: A Thief's End. He is voiced and motion captured by Brandon Scott, and is the owner of a salvage company and Nathan's employer. He attempts to persuade Nathan to join him in an illegal expedition in Malaysia, but Nathan politely turns him down. At the game's end, Jameson sells his company to Elena, who buys it from him with their plunder from Henry Avery's treasure.

=== Evelyn ===
Evelyn is a character that appears in flashback sequences in Uncharted 4: A Thief's End. She is voiced and motion captured by Merle Dandridge.

A celebrated historian, she knew and worked with Cassandra Morgan, Nathan and Sam's mother. One night, she caught the two boys breaking into her house when they went to retrieve their mother's belongings, but decided to share with them what their mother found. Just as the police arrive at the scene, Evelyn tells the boys that she will buy them some time, but suddenly collapses. She was a heavy smoker and died from a lung disease, and the boys are forced to flee lest they become implicated in her death. Thus she was instrumental in Nathan and Samuel's eventual turn to a life of exploring and treasure hunting and them adopting the Drake surname, in honor of what she and their mother believed and the fact that they could not return to their previous lives.

Various artifacts and letters scattered throughout her mansion reveal that she married a Japanese historian named Kenichiro Namba, and the two had a son named Edmund. Having grown obsessed with treasure hunting, she left Edmund to his father, and by the time of Kenichiro's death, Edmund had become resentful of his mother. The foreboding letters appear to be the primary driving force behind Nate balancing his relationship with treasure hunting.

=== Cassie Drake ===
Cassie Drake is the daughter of Nathan and Elena and niece of Sam. She was named after Cassandra Morgan, Nathan and Samuel's deceased mother and her paternal grandmother. She is voiced and motion captured by Kaitlyn Dever. She is playable in the epilogue chapter of Uncharted 4: A Thief's End.

While wandering around the house looking for her parents, she stumbles across the keys to Nathan's private wardrobe, where she discovers artifacts and photos from her parents' shady past before they catch her. Cassie demands to know the truth, and Nathan and Elena decide she is old enough to know, and tell her their story.

=== Meenu ===
Meenu is a character that appears in Uncharted: The Lost Legacy, voiced by Tierra Rolls. She is a young Indian shopkeeper that first appears in the beginning at a shop where Chloe tries to buy a scarf. She briefly pickpockets a figurine of Ganesh from Chloe as she is giving her a tour, but is caught and then helps her board an insurgent van by stalling a soldier. She later appears in the post credits scene of the game having pizza with Chloe, Nadine and Sam, as promised by the former at the beginning of the game.

== Reception ==
Matt Casamassina of IGN praised the characters of the Uncharted series for their growth and development, calling them strong characters. He also noted what he found as superior voice work and chemistry between the actors. He commended series writer Hennig for never having the characters say anything unnecessary that did not add to the relationships in the game. GameZone called the characters "endearing", "charming", and "unforgettable", and claimed that they had more personality than characters in most other video games. Ryan Clements of IGN praised the acting, claiming it brought a lifelike quality to the characters. He went on, "the sexual tension, detailed character expression, natural voice acting and charming dialogue make... cutscenes a supreme treat to watch." Jeff Haynes said that the game was anchored by the strong characters.

Ellie Gibson of Eurogamer said that the characters were easy to sympathize with because they were so realistic. Edge claimed the characters "sizzle with zip and pith", and praised the believable interactions between them. Ars Technica called the characters "oddly human" when discussing their realism. Ars Technica's Ben Kuchera also gave the voice acting high marks, claiming it set a new bar for video game voice acting. Johnny Minkley of Eurogamer claimed simply that players will care about the fate of all the characters in the series.

Tom Cross of Gamasutra commented that the characters in the Uncharted series were some of the few in video games to portray human sexuality realistically. However, he complained that the roles were predictable when compared to other fictional movie and television roles. He criticized, "while Among Thieves creates interesting, fun characters, it still pigeon holes them into stock character story arcs: the good girl, the guy who will become good, and the bad girl, who is allowed to be sexually suggestive because the plot will ultimately remove her as a viable partner for the ultimately good guy." Peadar Grogan of Edge commended the series for including strong female characters. Chris Roper of IGN stated that the characters of Uncharted are all unpredictable and have a high level of character development. Andrew Reiner of Game Informer found this exploration of character emotion integral to the series's story development. The character acting in Uncharted 2: Among Thieves received two nominations at the 13th Interactive Achievement Awards, for the acting of North as Drake and Black as Frazer. They were later nominated in 2011 in the VGA for voice acting. The nominees were North as Drake, Rose as Elena and Black as Chloe.
