= Chloe Frazer =

Fictional character from the Uncharted video game series

- Uncharted character
- Chloe Frazer in Uncharted: The Lost Legacy (2017)
- First appearance: Uncharted 2: Among Thieves (2009)
- Created by: Amy Hennig
- Voiced by: Claudia Black
- Motion capture: Claudia Black; Michelle Lee (TLL)
- Portrayed by: Sophia Ali (film adaptation)

Chloe Frazer is a fictional character in the Uncharted series, developed by Naughty Dog. Chloe, like series protagonist Nathan Drake, is a treasure hunter. Introduced in Uncharted 2: Among Thieves, where she has a romantic history with Drake, she later appears in Uncharted 3: Drake's Deception, and becomes the main protagonist in Uncharted: The Lost Legacy. Chloe is initially depicted as a strong character who aggressively looks out for her own interests, although over the course of The Lost Legacy she evolves into a more heroic and selfless individual. She is portrayed by Claudia Black through voice and motion capture.

Chloe was designed to provide a darker counterpart to Drake, while Black compared her personality to that of Indiana Jones. The character was well-received by gamers and the press, who noted her independence and sensuality while also considering her to be unique and fun; character designer Justin Richmond stated that she was one of his favorite characters in the series to create.

== Character design ==
Chloe Frazer was designed to play off of the personality of Nathan Drake, the main protagonist of the Uncharted series. Through interaction, she brings out particular facets of Drake's personality. Amy Hennig, series writer, wanted Chloe to act as a foil to Drake, essentially acting as a darker version of the main character. She also contrasts to Elena Fisher, who acts as the "good girl" of Uncharted.

Chloe was voiced by Claudia Black. For the series, motion capture actors acted as if performing in a movie. Motion capture was done on a soundstage, and the dialog recorded during this process was used in the game. The chemistry and interactions between Black and Nolan North, voice actor for Drake, had a hand in determining Chloe's personality. Black compared the process to a combination of stage, movie, and voice acting.

Chloe is of Indian ancestry on her father's side and was brought up in Australia. She is an impulsive and reckless adventurer. She is witty, devious, and fun seeking. Chloe is also a very sexually forward character; when she and Drake have a love scene, she acts as the initiator. At first, she appears only to look out for her own interests, caring little for anything but her goal.

Chloe was used heavily in promotion for Uncharted 2: Among Thieves, to showcase the fact that new characters were central to the story. She was displayed so heavily that at first some thought that Fisher, the female protagonist of the first game, would not be in the second.

== Appearances ==
Chloe Frazer, as she debuted in Uncharted 2

Near the beginning of Uncharted 2: Among Thieves, Chloe and business associate Harry Flynn convince Drake to help with a museum robbery. They have been hired by a wealthy benefactor to steal a piece of ancient Chinese pottery, which Kublai Khan had given to Marco Polo. Inside this ceramic lamp is a map and blue resin which reveal the location of Marco Polo's lost fleet. Unbeknownst to Flynn, Chloe and Drake had a previous relationship in the past, and resume their romance behind Flynn's back. Without Chloe's knowledge, Flynn betrays Drake, who ends up in a Turkish jail where he stays for three months. Chloe eventually engineers Drake's release, along with his associate Victor Sullivan. Chloe then begins traveling with Flynn, and war criminal Zoran Lazarevic. She discovers that they are after the fabled city of Shambhala and the Cintamani stone, seeking immortality. She acts as a double agent within Lazarevic's criminal organization, and seemingly betrays Drake to keep her "cover". She meets up with Drake in Nepal to assist in searching for the location of Shambhala before Flynn can find it. Later, Drake attempts to rescue her from a train controlled by Lazarevic, but she refuses to go with him, due to him bringing Elena and Jeff earlier. She appears later in the game in a monastery in the Himalayas, where she follows Drake and Lazarevic into the entrance of Shambhala, and assists in taking down Lazarevic's army, while Drake stops the leader himself. At the end of the game, seeing that Drake loves Elena, she leaves the two in the mountains.

Chloe returns in Uncharted 3: Drake's Deception, working with Nathan, Sully and new character Charlie Cutter to infiltrate the inner circle of Katherine Marlowe, who possesses the clues about the details of Sir Francis Drake's voyage to Arabia. They discover that the final clues lie in Crusader crypts in France and Syria, and Nate sends Chloe and Cutter to Syria to uncover it. During the search, Marlowe's men ambush them and a gunfight and chase ensues. Though they manage to escape alive, Cutter breaks his leg, and Chloe subsequently backs out of the adventure to get Cutter medical aid.

Chloe does not appear in the main story of Uncharted 4, however, during the beginning events of the game, it is shown that she sent a note to Nathan, saying she's available if he were to ever start treasure hunting again. She also is available to play as in the multiplayer. A standalone expansion was revealed, called Uncharted: The Lost Legacy featuring Chloe Frazer and Nadine Ross in a standalone story apart from the events of the Uncharted series, set after the events of Uncharted 4 after Nadine escapes. In the standalone expansion, Chloe's backstory is revealed. Her father was a treasure hunter who, while on the hunt for the Tusk of Ganesh, was killed by bandits when defending it. Chloe then hunts for the Tusk with Nadine's help while coming into conflict with Asav and his insurgency as well as Nadine's former army Shoreline. Later it is revealed that she initially teamed with Nathan's brother Sam, sending him to do recon for her but when he was abducted by Asav, enlisted Nadine's aid due to her history with Asav. She and Nadine then learn Asav was not seeking the tusk but actually wanted it so he could sell it for bomb which he can then use to destroy the city triggering a civil war. Chloe, Nadine and Sam then race against time and eventually stop Asav and his army, saving the day. She and Nadine then agree to partner up after the latter moves on from her initial goal of claiming Shoreline and develops a newfound interest in treasure hunting.

Sophia Ali portrayed Chloe in the 2022 film adaptation. In the film, she is Victor Sullivan's contact when Nathan and Sully reach Spain to find the treasure. She steals the first cross from Nathan but is convinced by both Nate and Sully to work with them. When they find out that the map indicates that the treasure is in The Philippines, she betrays Nate and takes the map, and it is later revealed that she had been hired by Moncada and Braddock to steal the map. After Moncada is killed, Chloe goes into hiding and helps Nate take out Braddock's henchmen before they both escape from the plane and land in the Philippines where they realize that the map doesn't pinpoint to the treasure. But Nate discovers the treasure's true location through hints left by postcards from his missing brother Sam and leaves the fake coordinates when he suspects that Chloe would betray him again. Chloe is last seen empty handed when Nate and Sully escape with a few pieces of treasure from Magellan's ships.

== Reception ==
Most critics have received Chloe Frazer positively, focusing on her strength and sexuality; they often cite her as an exceptional example of an independent female video game character. Tom Cross of Gamasutra called Chloe a strong woman, and compared her to Elika from Prince of Persia. He further called her a "first" in video games – a heterosexual female who badgers the male protagonist and displays competency and guile: "Chloe Frazer stands head and shoulders above all video game characters, but compared to most women in games, she is truly unique". He also characterizes her as one of "the most fun, interesting, inoffensive characters in video games". Cross also cited her as a character who accurately reflects the nature of human sexual desire and frustration. GamesRadar named Chloe "Miss 2009" of the "Sexiest New Characters of the Decade", calling her exotic and flirtatious. Entertainment Weekly's Darren Franich listed her as one of "15 Kick-Ass Women in Videogames", describing her as "tough, funny, and prone to backstabbing".

Claudia Black commented that Chloe was fun to portray, and is essentially "Indiana Jones with nice hair". Uncharted 2: Among Thieves game designer Justin Richmond called Chloe his favorite character. Black was nominated at the 2009 Spike Video Game Awards under the category "Best Voice" for her work as Chloe. Chloe was added to Fortnite Battle Royale with Nathan Drake in February 2022.
