= Uncharted (film) =

2022 film by Ruben Fleischer

- Theatrical release poster
- Directed by: Ruben Fleischer
- Screenplay by: Rafe Lee Judkins; Art Marcum Matt Holloway
- Story by: Rafe Lee Judkins; Jon Hanley Rosenberg; Mark D. Walker
- Based on: Uncharted by Naughty Dog
- Produced by: Charles Roven; Avi Arad; Alex Gartner; Ari Arad
- Starring: Tom Holland; Mark Wahlberg; Sophia Ali; Tati Gabrielle; Antonio Banderas
- Cinematography: Chung-hoon Chung
- Edited by: Chris Lebenzon; Richard Pearson
- Music by: Ramin Djawadi
- Production companies: Columbia Pictures; Arad Productions; Atlas Entertainment; PlayStation Productions
- Distributed by: Sony Pictures Releasing
- Release dates: February 7, 2022 (Barcelona); February 18, 2022 (United States)
- Running time: 116 minutes
- Country: United States
- Language: English
- Budget: $120 million
- Box office: $407.1 million

Uncharted is a 2022 American action adventure film based on the video game franchise developed by Naughty Dog and published by Sony Interactive Entertainment. Directed by Ruben Fleischer from a screenplay by Rafe Lee Judkins, Art Marcum, and Matt Holloway, it stars Tom Holland as Nathan Drake and Mark Wahlberg as Victor Sullivan, with Sophia Ali, Tati Gabrielle (in her film debut appearance), and Antonio Banderas starring in supporting roles. In the film, Drake is recruited by Sullivan in a race against corrupt billionaire Santiago Moncada (Banderas) and mercenary leader Jo Braddock (Gabrielle) to locate the fabled treasure of the Magellan expedition.

The film entered development in 2008, with producer Avi Arad stating that he would be working with Sony Pictures to develop a film adaptation of the video game franchise. It was then in development hell with various directors, screenwriters, and lead cast members attached at various points. Filmmakers David O. Russell, Neil Burger, Seth Gordon, Dan Trachtenberg, Shawn Levy, and Travis Knight were initially signed to direct, while Wahlberg was set to play Drake in early development. Holland was cast as Drake in May 2017, and Fleischer was hired as director in early 2020. Filming began in March 2020, but was halted by the COVID-19 pandemic. It resumed in July and finished in October, with locations including Boston, Barcelona, New York City, and Kiamba.

Originally set to be released on December 18, 2020, the film faced major delays due to the COVID-19 pandemic. It eventually premiered at the Coliseum in Barcelona on February 7, 2022, and was released in the United States on February 18 by Columbia Pictures (via Sony Pictures Releasing). The film received mixed reviews from critics, but was a commercial success, grossing $407.1 million worldwide against a $120 million budget, making it the fourth-highest-grossing video game film at the time of release. A sequel is in development.

== Plot ==
Orphaned brothers Sam and Nathan "Nate" Drake are caught trying to steal a map made after the Magellan expedition from a Boston museum. Before the orphanage can expel Sam, he sneaks out to be on his own, but promises Nate that he will return, leaving him a ring belonging to their supposed ancestor Sir Francis Drake.

Fifteen years later, Nate works as a bartender in New York City and pickpockets wealthy patrons. Victor "Sully" Sullivan, a fortune hunter who worked with Sam tracking treasure hidden by the Magellan crew, meets Nate and tells him that Sam vanished after helping him steal Juan Sebastián Elcano's diary. Nate, no longer receiving postcards from Sam, agrees to help Sully find him.

Sully and Nate go to an auction to steal a golden cross linked to the Magellan crew. There they meet Santiago Moncada, the last descendant of the Moncada family, who had financed Magellan's expedition, and Jo Braddock, leader of Moncada's mercenaries. Nate is ambushed by Braddock's men, and the ensuing fight creates a distraction for Sully to steal the cross.

The duo travels to Barcelona, where the treasure is supposedly hidden, and rendezvous with Sully's contact Chloe Frazer, who has the other cross. Nate, Chloe, and Sully follow clues in Elcano's diary to Santa Maria del Pi, finding a secret crypt behind the altar. Nate and Chloe enter, finding a trap door, but as they open it, the crypt floods with water.

Sully helps them escape after subduing an ambush by Braddock. Using the two crosses to unlock a secret passage, Nate and Chloe find a map indicating the treasure is in the Philippines. Chloe betrays Nate and leaves to take the map to Moncada, but she indicates that Sully is keeping a secret about Sam.

Sully recovers Nate and reveals that Sam was shot and possibly killed by Braddock three years prior and that he left him for dead, straining their partnership. Moncada, Chloe, and Braddock's team depart in a cargo plane to find the treasure, on which Braddock murders Moncada, gaining control of the operation.

Nate and Sully stow away on the plane, so Nate confronts Braddock. A battle ensues; Sully parachutes out with the map, while Nate and Chloe are ejected from the plane, landing in the Philippines. There, they realize the map does not pinpoint the treasure. Nate discovers the treasure's true location through hints left by Sam's postcards, but leaves fake coordinates for Chloe after correctly doubting her loyalties.

Nate discovers the Magellan ships and reunites with Sully, who had managed to follow Nate. Braddock follows close behind, forcing Nate and Sully to hide as her crew airlifts the ships. In their escape, Sully commandeers one of the helicopters, and Braddock orders another helicopter to approach for a boarding action.

Nate defends himself from Braddock's mercenaries and shoots down the other helicopter with one of the ship's cannons. When Braddock corners Nate, Sully throws a bag of collected treasure at her, casting her into the sea, where she is killed when the ship falls on her. As the Philippine Navy arrive, Nate and Sully get away with a few pieces of treasure Nate had pocketed, while Chloe is left empty-handed. Meanwhile, an imprisoned Sam, revealed to be alive and having somehow survived being shot by Braddock, writes another postcard to Nate asking him to watch his back.

In a mid-credits scene, Nate meets a man working for Roman, offering his ring for a "Nazi map" he has. He tries to betray Nate, but Sully saves him. They escape but are cornered by an unseen figure.

== Cast ==
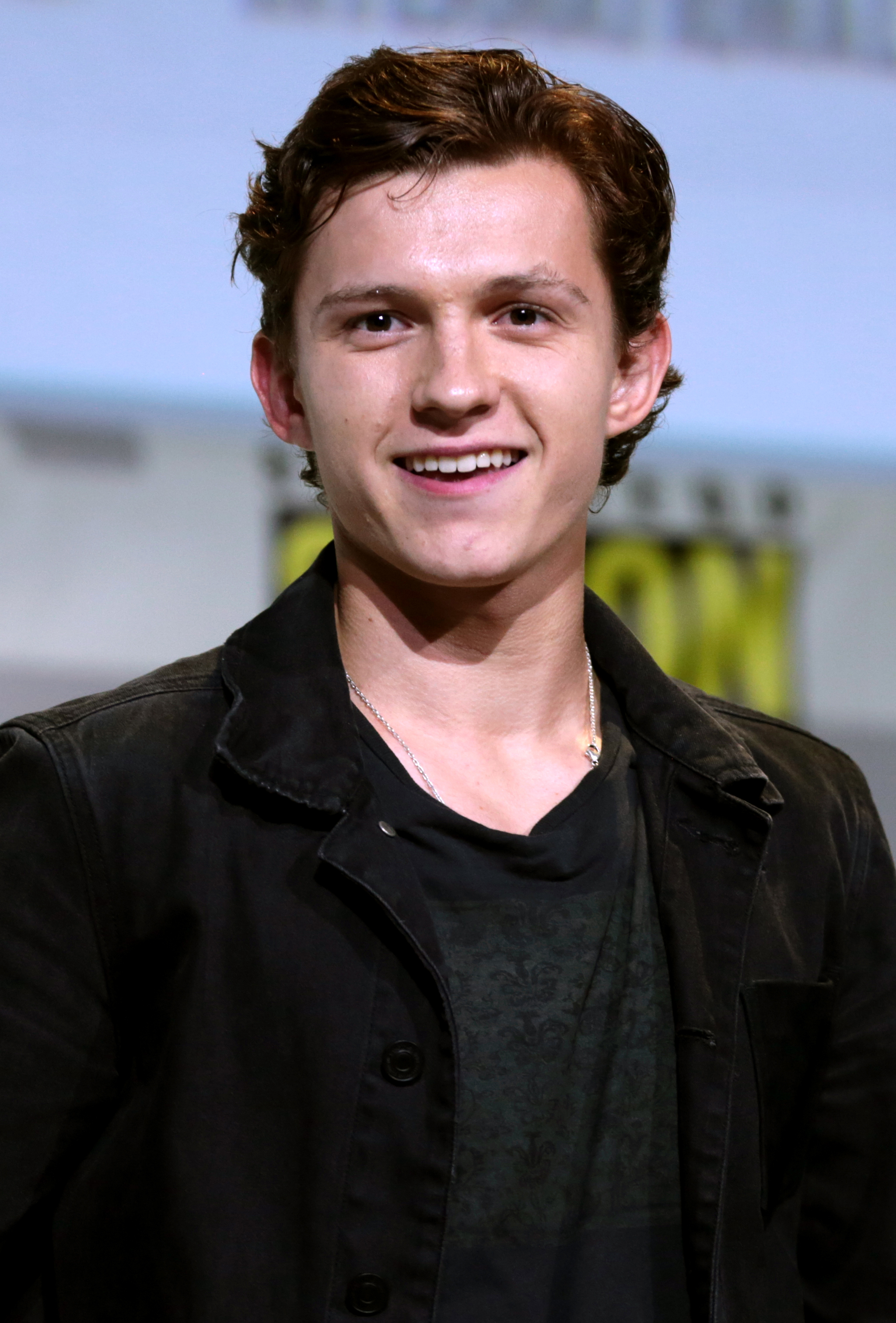
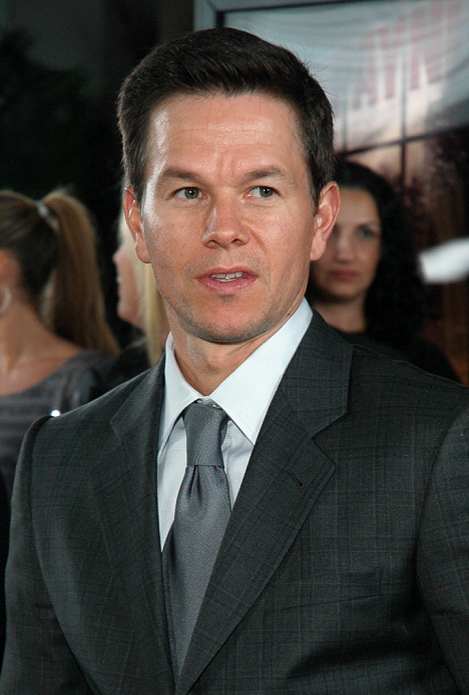
Tom Holland (left) and Mark Wahlberg (right) portray Nathan "Nate" Drake and Victor "Sully" Sullivan.
- Tom Holland as Nathan "Nate" Drake: A young bartender who is recruited by Sully to find the fabled treasure of the Magellan expedition and claims to be a descendant of famed English explorer Sir Francis Drake. To practice as a barman, Holland was taught how to do shifts by the Chiltern Firehouse staff. When filming halted due to the COVID-19 pandemic, Holland continued to train for the role.
  - Tiernan Jones as young Nate.
- Mark Wahlberg as Victor "Sully" Sullivan: A seasoned fortune hunter who previously worked with Nate's brother, Sam. Wahlberg was originally set to star as Drake in early development.
- Antonio Banderas as Santiago Moncada: A ruthless treasure hunter and the descendant of the Moncada family.
- Sophia Ali as Chloe Frazer: A fellow fortune hunter, and Sully's associate.
- Tati Gabrielle as Jo Braddock: A mercenary working with Moncada against Nate and Sully.
- Rudy Pankow as Samuel "Sam" Drake: Nathan's long-lost brother.

Manuel de Blas appears as Armando Moncada, Santiago's father whom he kills to fund his expedition, Steven Waddington as the Scotsman, Alana Boden as Zoe, and Pingi Moli as Hugo. Nolan North, who provides the voice and motion capture of Nathan Drake in the video games, has a cameo as a hotel guest on the beach who talks to Nate and Chloe. Pilou Asbæk portrays Gage in the mid-credits scene, and ElrubiusOMG appears as a background extra in Barcelona.

== Production ==
=== Development ===
In 2008, film producer Avi Arad stated that he was working with a division of Sony Pictures to develop the film adaptation of Uncharted. In response to a question posed to Richard Lemarchand, lead game designer of Naughty Dog, on whether he would like to see a film adaptation of Uncharted, he replied "no comment". Since then, Columbia Pictures had confirmed that an Uncharted film was being developed. The film was at first to be written by Thomas Dean Donnelly and Joshua Oppenheimer and produced by Avi Arad, Charles Roven and Alex Gartner. As of June 30, 2009, it was confirmed that the Uncharted film had been in development for the last year and a half. Nathan Fillion expressed an interest in playing Nathan Drake and started a campaign on Twitter to encourage fans to support him in the endeavor. In an August 2010 interview, Naughty Dog told PlayStation University how close they really were with the development of the film and that they had trust with all who were working on it.

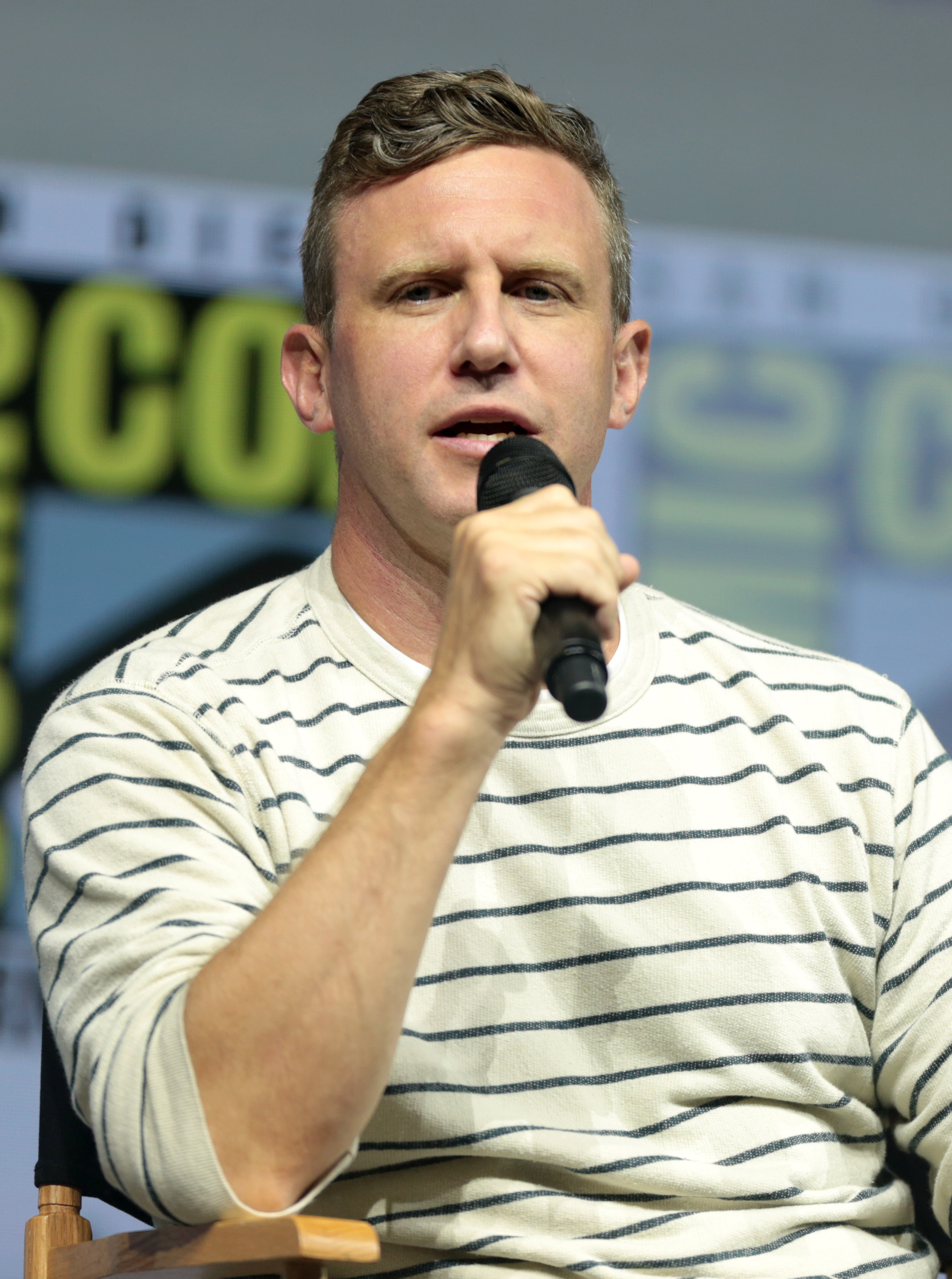
After a complicated development, Ruben Fleischer (pictured in 2018) served as the director of Uncharted.

On October 8, 2010, it was announced by Doug Belgrad and Matt Tolmach, co-presidents of Columbia Pictures, that David O. Russell had been set to write and direct the film, an action adventure based upon the first game in the series. The film would be produced by Avi Arad, Charles Roven, and Alex Gartner. Following a screening of Russell's film, The Fighter, he was approached by a fan of the Uncharted series who asked whether he had considered Fillion for the role of Nathan Drake for the upcoming film due to the high number of requests for him to fulfill the role. Russell was unaware of the interest in Fillion and who he was and seemed to quickly dismiss the idea. Fillion would then later go on to do a short Uncharted fan-film 8 years later, featuring him as Nathan Drake to positive reception.

On November 24, 2010, an interview with Mark Wahlberg was published by MTV with the actor discussing his involvement in the film adaptation of the popular franchise. He stated that Russell was currently writing the script and was excited for what he had in store, hoping to shoot in the middle of 2011: "I'm obviously in whatever David wants to do but the idea of it is so off the charts: Robert De Niro being my father, Joe Pesci being my uncle. It's not going to be the watered-down version, that's for sure." On May 26, 2011, it was reported that Russell had departed the film to direct Silver Linings Playbook. On July 6, Variety reported that Neil Burger was stepping in for Russell. Burger landed the offer after the studio and producers Avi Arad, Charles Roven, and Alex Gartner sparked to his new take on the film. Burger spoke out about the film in July, saying the following:

We're re-writing the script from scratch[...] and until the screenplay is written you never know who's going to be acting in it or not. I think it's a great adventure, it has pretty great character at its core [but] there will be (balance) in this [film]. [It's] one that is a very great adventure, and it's just a matter of pulling out the cool intense stuff that works for the film story, and making sure the story supports those elements and also makes us connected to the character.

On August 23, 2012, Burger dropped out to work on Divergent and the studio hired the husband and wife team of Marianne and Cormac Wibberley to rewrite the film. In an interview with IGN, Seth Rogen and Evan Goldberg said they were asked to write the film multiple times, but declined all of them. On February 4, 2014, Deadline reported that Seth Gordon would direct the film with the latest script being written by David Guggenheim. Production was set to begin in early 2015. The film was originally scheduled for release on June 10, 2016. On November 12, 2014, the studio hired Mark Boal to write the film. After Wahlberg, Chris Pratt was approached to portray Nathan Drake, but he declined the offer. Jamie Dornan also tested for the role. On June 24, 2015, Seth Gordon left the project to work on Baywatch.

In April 2015, the script written by David Guggenheim was leaked, having been obtained in the Sony Pictures hack. On August 5, 2015, Sony Pictures Entertainment pushed the film's release date back to June 30, 2017. In an interview with Game News Official, Nolan North, who voiced Nathan Drake in the video games, stated that he believed that fans did not want an Uncharted film. Charles Roven did reveal to Collider that what they were working on was pretty exciting, there was a director that they did not have at the moment, and they were not ready to cast that vote until they were actually ready to cast. In April 2016, Neil Druckmann, who had worked on previous Uncharted games, said that the most important aspect of the film is the character relationships.

On July 29, 2016, Variety reported that Joe Carnahan was writing the draft of the film's script. On September 1, 2016, the film was removed from Sony's release calendar due to not having a director or cast, but Sony was still moving forward with the film. On October 25, 2016, Shawn Levy was announced to be directing the film. Carnahan said to Collider that he and Levy are knowledgeable about the game, and had been hard at work getting the characters right. The filming was set to begin in early 2017. In early January 2017, Carnahan posted a photo on his Instagram to show that the script of the film had been completed. Ryan Reynolds vied and nearly signed on as Nathan Drake, but his commitments to the Deadpool films prevented it. In May 2017, Tom Holland was cast as a young Nathan Drake, with the film serving as a prequel to the games. Television writer Rafe Judkins was brought on to rework the script. On December 19, 2018, it was announced that Levy had departed the film to instead work on Free Guy, a film about a fictional video game.

On January 14, 2019, Variety reported that Dan Trachtenberg had signed on to direct the film. In June 2019, The Hollywood Reporter confirmed that the film was set to be released on December 18, 2020. On August 22, 2019, Deadline reported that Dan Trachtenberg had exited the film, with the film scheduled to go into production in early 2020. The film would become the first feature production of Sony's PlayStation Productions. On September 27, 2019, The Hollywood Reporter informed that Travis Knight would direct the film. In November, Wahlberg returned to the project to star alongside Holland in the role of Victor Sullivan. In December 2019, Knight left the project due to scheduling conflicts with Holland, which resulted in the film losing its December 18, 2020 release date.

=== Pre-production ===
In January 2020, Ruben Fleischer entered talks to replace Knight as director, with the film's release date pushed back to March 5, 2021. Chung-hoon Chung was hired as the cinematographer, while Chris Lebenzon and Richard Pearson served as editors. In February 2020, Fleischer was confirmed as director, with the film's plot serving as an origin story to the games. The film would take inspiration from Uncharted 4: A Thief's End, the fourth game in the series. In March, Antonio Banderas, Sophia Ali, and Tati Gabrielle were added to the cast, with Art Marcum and Matt Holloway contributing to the script.

=== Filming ===
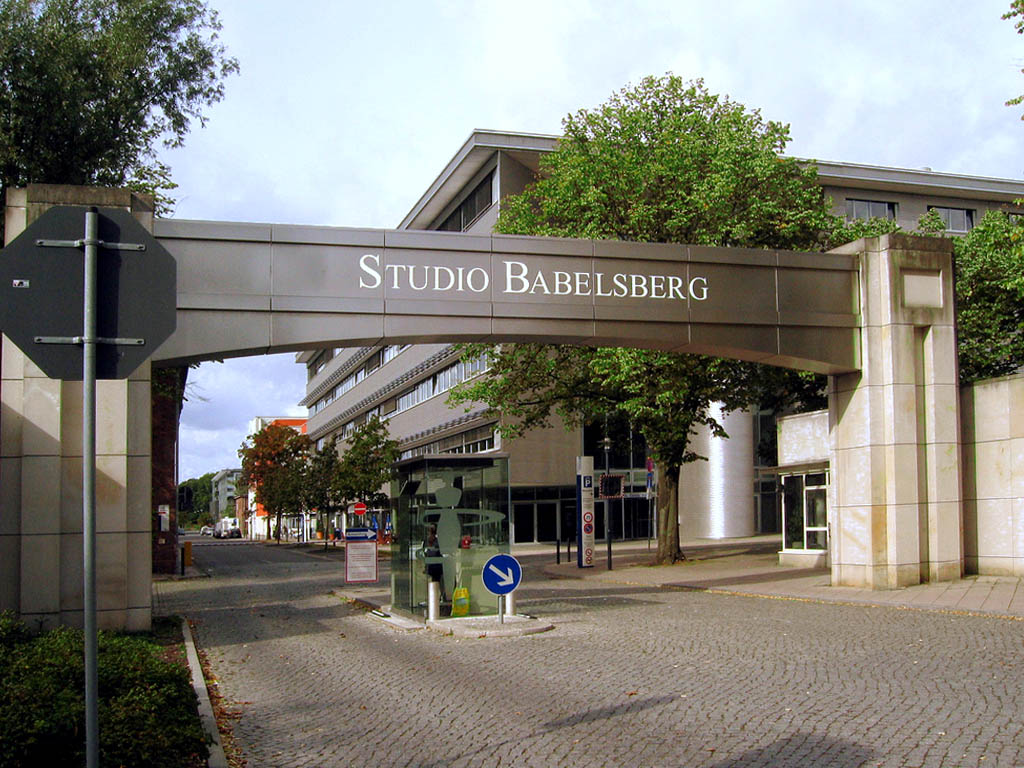
Portions of the film were shot at Babelsberg Studios.

Principal photography began on March 16, 2020, in Babelsberg Studios, near Berlin, Germany. Filming was shut down later that day due to the COVID-19 pandemic. It was believed filming had resumed on July 15, 2020; however, Sony Pictures clarified that while production had not yet resumed, they were undergoing preparations to restart production. Production officially resumed on July 20, 2020, shooting in Babelsberg Studios, with social distancing measures and mask requirements being implemented on and off the set. On August 5, 2020, Banderas temporarily left production after he tested positive for COVID-19. On August 26, 2020, Banderas recovered from the virus, returning to production soon after. On September 16, 2020, filming moved to Berlin, with set photos being released online. In the beginning of October 2020, the production shot scenes in Alicante and Valencia, Spain, including the coastal town of Xàbia. Digital shots were used to recreate the Philippines due to filming restrictions from the pandemic. Several action scenes drew inspiration from Jackie Chan; according to Holland, the bar fight was inspired by Chan's use of his surroundings to fight people in unique ways.

On October 23, 2020, Holland finished shooting his scenes, before production concluded on October 29 in Barcelona. Reshoots took place in July 2021 in Madrid.

Deadline Hollywood reported that the film cost $120 million. Variety reported on February 22 that the film cost $90 million to produce, and on February 27 they reported it cost $120 million to produce.

== Music ==
Uncharted – Original Motion Picture Soundtrack

Soundtrack album by Ramin Djawadi
- Released: February 18, 2022
- Genre: Film score
- Length: 58:32
- Label: Sony Masterworks
- Producer: Ramin Djawadi

Ramin Djawadi chronology
Eternals (2021)	Uncharted – Original Motion Picture Soundtrack (2022)	The Man From Toronto (2022)

All music is composed by Ramin Djawadi. Djawadi also referenced Greg Edmonson's "Nate's Theme" from Uncharted: Drake's Fortune, Uncharted 2: Among Thieves, and Uncharted 3: Drake's Deception in the film. Additionally, American band Milkblood produced a song titled "No Mind", which was released on February 16, 2022, and used for the end credits sequence.

No.	Title	Length
1.	"Uncharted"	2:06
2.	"Parachute"	1:41
3.	"Brothers"	1:58
4.	"Hey, Kid"	1:49
5.	"I'm All In"	1:42
6.	"Meeting Braddock"	2:02
7.	"Only One Rule in This Game"	4:31
8.	"Heart of Gold"	2:15
9.	"Cross Purposes"	2:15
10.	"Clockwise Keys"	3:15
11.	"Skeleton with Angel Wings"	3:23
12.	"Give Me the Cross"	3:13
13.	"Giant Urns"	1:33
14.	"Sully's Secret"	1:48
15.	"Ready to Make History"	2:33
16.	"Have Some Respect"	1:13
17.	"House of Moncada"	2:16
18.	"Postcards"	3:18
19.	"A Whole World You Haven't Seen"	4:01
20.	"Flying Galleons"	2:11
21.	"Cannonball"	3:41
22.	"Lost Not Gone"	2:01
23.	"The Biggest Treasure Never Found"	3:47
Total length:		58:32

== Release ==
=== Theatrical ===
Uncharted had its world premiere in Barcelona, Spain on February 7, 2022. The film was theatrically released by Sony Pictures Releasing in the United States on February 18, in IMAX, Dolby Cinema, and 4DX. The film was originally set for release on December 18, 2020, and then to March 5, 2021, after Travis Knight's departure. It was further delayed to October 8, 2021, due to the COVID-19 pandemic. The film was then moved up to July 16, 2021, before moving to February 11, 2022, and then again to the following week.

==== Bans in the Philippines and Vietnam ====
Uncharted was banned in Vietnam and the Philippines due to the appearance of a treasure map featuring the nine-dash line that depicts the South China Sea as being part of China's territory. On March 12, 2022, the film was banned from distribution in Vietnam for containing "illegal images" of the nine-dash line. The film was due to hit Vietnamese theaters on March 18. On April 27, the Movie and Television Review and Classification Board of the Philippines banned the release of Uncharted in the country following a request by the Philippine Department of Foreign Affairs to do so, stating that the scenes featuring the nine-dash line were "contrary to national interest".

=== Home media ===
In April 2021, Sony signed deals with Netflix and The Walt Disney Company for the streaming rights to their 2022 to 2026 film slate, including Uncharted, following the films' theatrical and home media windows. The film was released digitally on April 26, 2022, and was released on Ultra HD Blu-ray, Blu-ray and DVD on May 10, 2022. The film was released on Netflix in the USA on August 5, 2022, delayed from its initial release date, July 15, 2022. The film was released on Hulu and on Disney+ in the USA on January 15, 2024.

=== Marketing ===
According to iSpot, Sony spent around $20 million in television spots, generating 1.12 billion impressions. The film was particularly advertised on NBC, CBS, ESPN, ABC, and Fox across programs including NFL football, SportsCenter, the 2022 Winter Olympics, and the NBA. Social media firm RelishMix said a commercial for the film created in a cross-promotion with Hyundai Motors, broadcast during the pregame of Super Bowl LVI, generated 522.3 million interactions online within the first 24 hours of airing, exceeding expectations. Online accounts for the film accumulated 407,000 followers with 40.9 million views from 42 Facebook videos and 104.6 million views from 24 YouTube videos. Holland's 68.4 million followers on social media were also highlighted as significant factors in the film's box office performance.

== Reception ==
=== Box office ===
Uncharted grossed $148.6 million in the United States and in Canada, and $258.5 million in other territories, for a worldwide total of $407.1 million. The result lands Uncharted as the eighth-highest-grossing film based on a video game of all time worldwide. This puts the domestic grossing position of the film as the fifth-highest-grossing, behind The Super Mario Bros. Movie, A Minecraft Movie, Sonic the Hedgehog and its sequel. Internationally only, Uncharted is the seventh-highest-grossing video game adaptation.

In the United States and Canada, Uncharted was released alongside Dog and The Cursed, and was projected to gross $25–35 million from 4,275 theaters in its opening weekend (as well as $30–40 million if including the Presidents' Day holiday). The film earned an estimated $15.4 million on its first day, including $3.7 million from Thursday night previews. Its opening surpassed projections, grossing $44 million in three days and $51.3 million in four days. It had the biggest opening during the first two months of 2022. It grossed $23 million in its second weekend, $11.1 million in its third, $9.3 million in its fourth, $7.8 million in its fifth, $5 million in its sixth, $3.7 million in its seventh, $2.6 million in its eighth, and $1.2 million in its ninth. The film dropped out of the box office top ten in its tenth weekend, finishing thirteenth with $470,643.

Outside the United States and Canada, the film grossed $21.5 million in its opening weekend from 15 international markets (a week before its North American opening). It opened in first place at the box office in all of its markets, including the United Kingdom ($6.4 million), Russia ($4.5 million), and Spain ($3.5 million). The film's international opening gross was reported to be ahead of the debuts of Marvel Studios' 2021 films Black Widow, Shang-Chi and the Legend of the Ten Rings, and Eternals. In its second international weekend (the same weekend it released in North America), the film grossed a further $55.4 million from 62 overseas territories, bringing its worldwide gross to $139 million up until then. From 64 markets, the film earned an additional $35 million in its third weekend and $17.4 million in its fourth. The film crossed the $300 million mark worldwide after adding $11.2 million in its fifth weekend, and the $200 million mark internationally with the addition of $19 million in its sixth weekend. The film earned $7.7 million in its seventh weekend, $3.1 million in its ninth, $2.1 million in its tenth, $1.4 million in its eleventh, and $1.2 million in its twelfth. It crossed the $400 million worldwide mark in its fifteenth weekend in theaters.

=== Critical response ===
The review aggregator Rotten Tomatoes reported an approval rating of 41%, with an average rating of 5.3/10, based on 265 reviews. The website's critical consensus reads, "Promisingly cast but misleadingly titled, Uncharted mines its bestselling source material to produce a disappointing echo of superior adventure films." Metacritic, which uses a weighted average, assigned the film a score of 45 out of 100, based on 44 critics, indicating "mixed or average" reviews. Audiences surveyed by CinemaScore gave the film an average grade of "B+" on an A+ to F scale, while those polled at PostTrak gave it a 79% positive score, with 61% saying they would definitely recommend it.

Owen Gleiberman of Variety found the film "watchable in a thin 'Raiders of the Lost National Treasure of the Fast & Furious Caribbean' way." IGN's Jeffrey Vega gave the film a 7 out of 10, stating it "plays it safe, but it's mostly a fun and effective adventure", while also praising Holland's performance. Reviewing for TheWrap, Todd Gilchrist also praised Holland's performance, citing "undeniable charisma and sincerity that makes him tirelessly likable." Peter Bradshaw of The Guardian gave the film a 2 out of 5, labelling it "an efficient, soulless hologram". The Independent's Clarisse Loughrey also gave the film 2 out of 5 and criticized the casting and script, writing, "There's a lot to Uncharted that feels haphazard or under-considered." Writing for Empire, Nick de Semlyen criticized the dialogue between Holland and Wahlberg and called Banderas "a colourless villain". Similar criticism was noted in Marshall Shaffer's review for The Playlist, who wrote "every line feels as if it had to pass a corporate committee vote", giving the film a C. Robert Kojder of Polygon criticized the weak chemistry between Wahlberg and Holland and the editing, stating the film "lack stakes, genuine peril, or adrenaline-pumping adventure", which was echoed by Gizmodo's Germain Lussier, who concluded the film feels "thrown together with the hope a name brand will tie it all together".

Adam Rosenberg of Mashable praised the cinematography and compared Holland's performance to be a "nod to Jackie Chan's slapstick acrobatics", but said the story and characters were underdeveloped. Calling it a "nitwit treasure-hunt movie" in her New York Times write-up, Manohla Dargis gave a negative review, saying Uncharted is "an amalgam of clichés past their sell-by date." Giving the film a C−, IndieWire's David Ehrlich negatively compared the film to the video games stating, "Perhaps the film's Walmart approach to its action would've been more forgivable if the games weren't so frequently suffused with Spielbergian flair, just as the film's archetypal characters may have been less underwhelming had the games not managed to establish 10 times the pathos with none of the same flesh and blood." Writing for The Globe and Mail, Barry Hertz agreed, stating "Fleischer and his many writers delivered a straight-faced assault of under-the-top tedium", and concluding the film carries a "bizarre, utter disdain for its audience". Danny Leigh of Financial Times said the film "feels uptight [and] joyless", negatively comparing it to Police Story and Raiders of the Lost Ark (1981).

Writing for Engadget, Devindra Hardawar said Uncharted was "aggressively average" and criticized the screenplay, writing "our heroes quip, defy physics [but] never feel like they're in any danger". Reviewing for Ars Technica, Sam Machkovech gave a negative review regarding the film's action sequences, describing Uncharted as "a high school film class' rendition of Bourne", and negatively compared it to the video games. Conversely, CNN's Brian Lowry praised the action sequences but criticized the character development, stating it felt the filmmakers treated it as an "unnecessary distraction". Charles Pulliam-Moore of The Verge also criticized the film for its lack of defined characters, writing, "The bulk of Nathan and Sully's banter falls flat due to an unfortunate blend of questionable chemistry and hackneyed dialogue as the film can't commit to a focus or a tone, making it feel much longer than it actually is all throughout".

== Sequel ==
Fleischer expressed interest in a sequel, citing the car chase from A Thief's End as a set piece he would like to replicate, but noted that it was entirely dependent on the financial success of the first film. Following its opening weekend, chairman of Sony Pictures, Tom Rothman, said Uncharted is a new franchise for Sony. In August 2023, producer Charles Roven expressed optimism in the prospects for a sequel, saying, "We had a really good time with that movie. The fans really liked the movie, and people who didn't know anything about the game really liked the movie. So we are definitely looking to make another one of those." On December 10, 2023, Wahlberg revealed in an interview that the script is being written. In June 2024, Sony Pictures Entertainment's Steven O'Dell confirmed that a sequel was in development.

== See also ==
- List of films based on video games
