= Find Your Friends =

- Release poster
- Directed by: Izabel Pakzad
- Written by: Izabel Pakzad
- Produced by: Monika Bacardi; Allison Friedman; Andrea Iervolino; Luca Matrundola; Izabel Pakzad; Gary Michael Walters
- Starring: Helena Howard; Bella Thorne; Zión Moreno; Chloe Cherry; Sophia Ali
- Cinematography: Tim Curtin
- Edited by: Maxime Pozzi-Garcia
- Music by: Ben Frost
- Production companies: Welcome To Italy; WWPS; Angry Cloud; Lady Bacardi Media; Walters Media Group
- Distributed by: Shudder
- Release dates: July 18, 2025 (Fantasia); June 12, 2026 (United States)
- Running time: 93 minutes
- Countries: United States; Italy
- Language: English

Find Your Friends is a 2025 thriller film written and directed by Izabel Pakzad and starring Helena Howard, Bella Thorne, Zión Moreno, Chloe Cherry and Sophia Ali.

In April 2024, it was announced that filming had concluded and the film premiered at the 29th Fantasia International Film Festival in 2025. Shudder acquired the film and is scheduled to be released on June 12, 2026.

== Cast ==
- Helena Howard as Amber
- Bella Thorne as Lavinia
- Zión Moreno as Zosia
- Chloe Cherry as Lola
- Sophia Ali as Maddy
- Chris Bauer as Russell
- Jake Manley as Jake
- Israel Broussard as Will
- Harrison Sloan Gilbertson as Coby
- Blaine Kern III as Tye

== Reception ==
On the review aggregator website Rotten Tomatoes, 44% of 32 critics' reviews are positive, with an average rating of 5.3/10. The website's consensus reads: "Find Your Friends mistakes excess and shock for thematic depth, collapsing an intriguing psychological premise into a meandering, emotionally disconnected slog."
