= Uncharted: The Lost Legacy =

2017 video game

- Developer: Naughty Dog (Note: Ported to Windows by Iron Galaxy)
- Publisher: Sony Interactive Entertainment
- Directors: Kurt Margenau; Shaun Escayg
- Designer: James Cooper
- Programmers: Travis McIntosh; Christian Gyrling; Jason Gregory; Sandeep Shekar; Vincent Marxen
- Artists: Tate Mosesian; Andrew Maximov; Erick Pangilinan
- Writers: Shaun Escayg; Josh Scherr
- Composer: Henry Jackman
- Series: Uncharted
- Platforms: PlayStation 4; PlayStation 5; Windows
- Release: PlayStation 4: NA: August 22, 2017; PAL: August 23, 2017; PlayStation 5: WW: January 28, 2022; Windows: WW: October 19, 2022
- Genres: Action-adventure, third-person shooter
- Modes: Single-player, multiplayer

Uncharted: The Lost Legacy is a 2017 action-adventure game developed by Naughty Dog and published by Sony Interactive Entertainment, serving as a standalone expansion to the 2016 game Uncharted 4: A Thief's End. Players control Chloe Frazer, who seeks the Tusk of Ganesh in the Western Ghats mountain ranges of India, with the help of ex-mercenary Nadine Ross, and prevent a ruthless warlord and his army of insurgents from igniting a civil war in the country. It is the first Uncharted game not to feature series protagonist Nathan Drake. Like other Uncharted games, The Lost Legacy is played from a third-person perspective; players use firearms and can use melee combat and stealth to defend against enemies. Players solve puzzles, incorporating several platformer elements to advance the narrative, and navigate the game world on foot or by vehicle.

Development of The Lost Legacy began soon after the release of A Thief's End in May 2016. It builds upon gameplay elements established in previous Uncharted titles with its more open-ended gameplay. Chloe, a supporting character who appeared in previous Uncharted games as a friend, love interest, and associate to Nathan Drake, is the focus of the game, with the story, design, and gameplay elements reflecting her character. Claudia Black, Laura Bailey and Troy Baker reprised their roles as Chloe, Nadine and Samuel Drake respectively, through voice and motion capture, and assisted writer Josh Scherr and creative director Shaun Escayg with the development of the characters and story.

The Lost Legacy was released for PlayStation 4 in August 2017; a remastered version was released for PlayStation 5 and Windows as part of the Legacy of Thieves Collection in 2022. The game received generally favorable reviews.

== Gameplay ==
Uncharted: The Lost Legacy is an action-adventure game played from a third-person perspective, with platform game elements and set in the Indian Peninsula. Players control Chloe Frazer—a treasure hunter who is physically adept and can jump, sprint, climb, swim, swing, and perform other acrobatic actions. Players traverse several environments, moving through locations including towns, buildings, and temples to advance through the game's story. Players use firearms, melee combat, and stealth to defend against the hostile enemies, and also drive vehicles during some gameplay segments.

Players and companions may take cover behind objects during firefights, using it as a tactical advantage and to avoid taking damage from enemies.

In combat, players can use long-ranged weapons, such as rifles and shotguns, and short-barreled guns such as pistols and revolvers; handheld explosives such as grenades and C4 are also available. Though players can attack enemies directly, they have the option to use stealth tactics to attack undetected or sneak by them; the game introduces silenced weapons. While the game is linear, environments feature multiple paths for players to explore; maps are larger than those in Uncharted 4: A Thief's End. The game features an artificial intelligence system in which hostile enemies react to any combat situation they are placed in; they respond to players' actions, coordinate tactics, and cooperate with each other. Players' companions are also controlled by artificial intelligence and can assist in combat by throwing objects at threats to stun them, announcing the location of unseen enemies, or using weapons to attack enemies. The game features periods without combat, often involving conversation between the characters. Players also can decide the outcome of some conversations through a dialogue tree.

The game gives access to the multiplayer of Uncharted 4, with additional content tied into The Lost Legacy.

== Plot ==
During an insurgency, treasure hunter Chloe Frazer (Claudia Black) searches for the legendary tusk of Ganesh, the son of Hindu god Shiva, who lost the tusk while defending his father's temple. Chloe's father was killed by bandits while searching for the tusk. Chloe slips past insurgents and meets up with mercenary Nadine Ross (Laura Bailey). They sneak into the office of the insurgents' leader, Asav (Usman Ally) a former acquaintance of Nadine, who wants to use the tusk to rally India into a civil war. Chloe and Nadine steal a map pointing toward the tusk within the ancient Hoysala Empire and a disc that acts as a key.

In India's Western Ghats, Chloe and Nadine follow the trail of several towers emblazoned with Hindu weapons: Ganesh's trident, Shiva's bow, and the axe of Parashurama, who used the axe to remove the tusk. The trail leads them to one of Hoysala's two capitals, Halebidu, whose last emperor left to be conquered by the Persians seemingly out of vanity. They realize the emperor left a false trail; the tusk is at the older capital, Belur. On the way there, they escape Asav and his men but lose the disc. While spying on Asav's forces, Nadine sees her old enemy Samuel Drake (Troy Baker); she realizes he is Asav's expert. When she expresses her intention to kill Sam, primarily due to the events that transpired in Libertalia, Chloe reveals she was working with him before he was abducted. Feeling angry and betrayed, Nadine separates from Chloe, but they make amends.

At Belur, they navigate several puzzles before being captured by Asav, who has realized that Sam is no expert and was misleading them the whole time, forcing Chloe to use the disc to reveal the tusk. In the process, she discovers that Ganesh allowed Parashurama to cut off his tusk; as Shiva gave the axe to him, Ganesh did not want to shame his father by proving the axe useless. Asav triggers a trap and leaves Chloe, Nadine and Sam to drown. Chloe picks the locks on their handcuffs and they escape. Despite tensions between Nadine and Sam, the three chase after Asav to take back the tusk. Nadine is enraged to find that Asav is working with Shoreline, the mercenary group she used to run and from which she was ousted.

Asav trades the tusk to Orca (Gideon Emery), Nadine's former lieutenant, who now runs Shoreline. Chloe, Nadine and Sam take down Orca's helicopter and learn that Asav traded the tusk for a bomb he plans to detonate in the capital and trigger a civil war. Orca pulls a gun on Nadine, but Sam saves her, allowing her to kill Orca. Commandeering a jeep, the three catch up to the train carrying the bomb. The women board the train and fight through Asav's men. Chloe and Sam switch the tracks, redirecting the train away from the city. In the engine car, Chloe and Nadine fight Asav, whose leg gets trapped under the bomb. They jump to safety before the train falls from a collapsed bridge and explodes, killing Asav. Chloe and Nadine decide to partner up, while Sam reacts with horror at their intentions to donate the tusk to the Ministry of Culture instead of selling it.

== Development ==
Naughty Dog began developing The Lost Legacy following the release of Uncharted 4: A Thief's End in May 2016, initially exploring narrative ideas. Kurt Margenau and Shaun Escayg were chosen to lead development as game director and creative director, respectively. Margenau was selected for his knowledge of programming and passion for gaming and interactivity, while Escayg was chosen for his understanding of narrative structure. The game's original score was written by Henry Jackman, who previously composed for A Thief's End. While the development team initially contemplated creating a fifth main Uncharted game, they opted to create downloadable content (DLC) for A Thief's End, as the simultaneous development of The Last of Us Part II led them to favor a more condensed story for a sooner release.

The Lost Legacy was announced at the PlayStation Experience event on December 4, 2016, alongside its debut gameplay trailer. A gameplay video was released in April 2017, revealing the release date and announcing the pre-order bonus: the original Jak and Daxter: The Precursor Legacy, emulated on PlayStation 4. A story trailer was also shown at E3 in June. The game was released for PlayStation 4 on August 22, 2017 in North America, and August 23 in Europe. The standalone version of The Lost Legacy was removed from the PlayStation Store in December 2021, with the game available only in a digital bundle with A Thief's End. A remastered version for PlayStation 5 was released on January 28, 2022 alongside A Thief's End, as part of the Uncharted: Legacy of Thieves Collection. The Windows version, developed in collaboration with Iron Galaxy, was released on October 19, 2022.

=== Story and characters ===
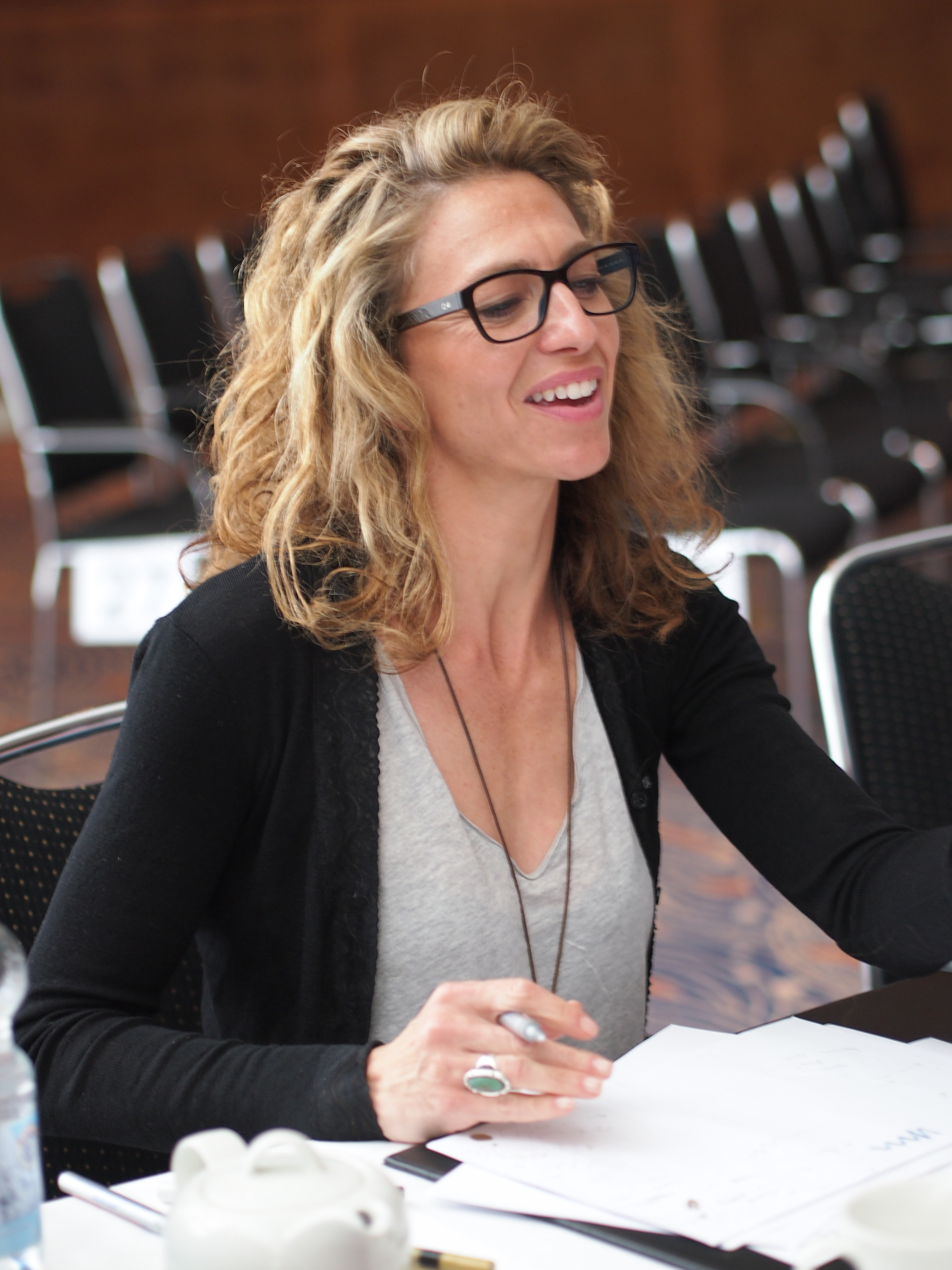
Claudia Black

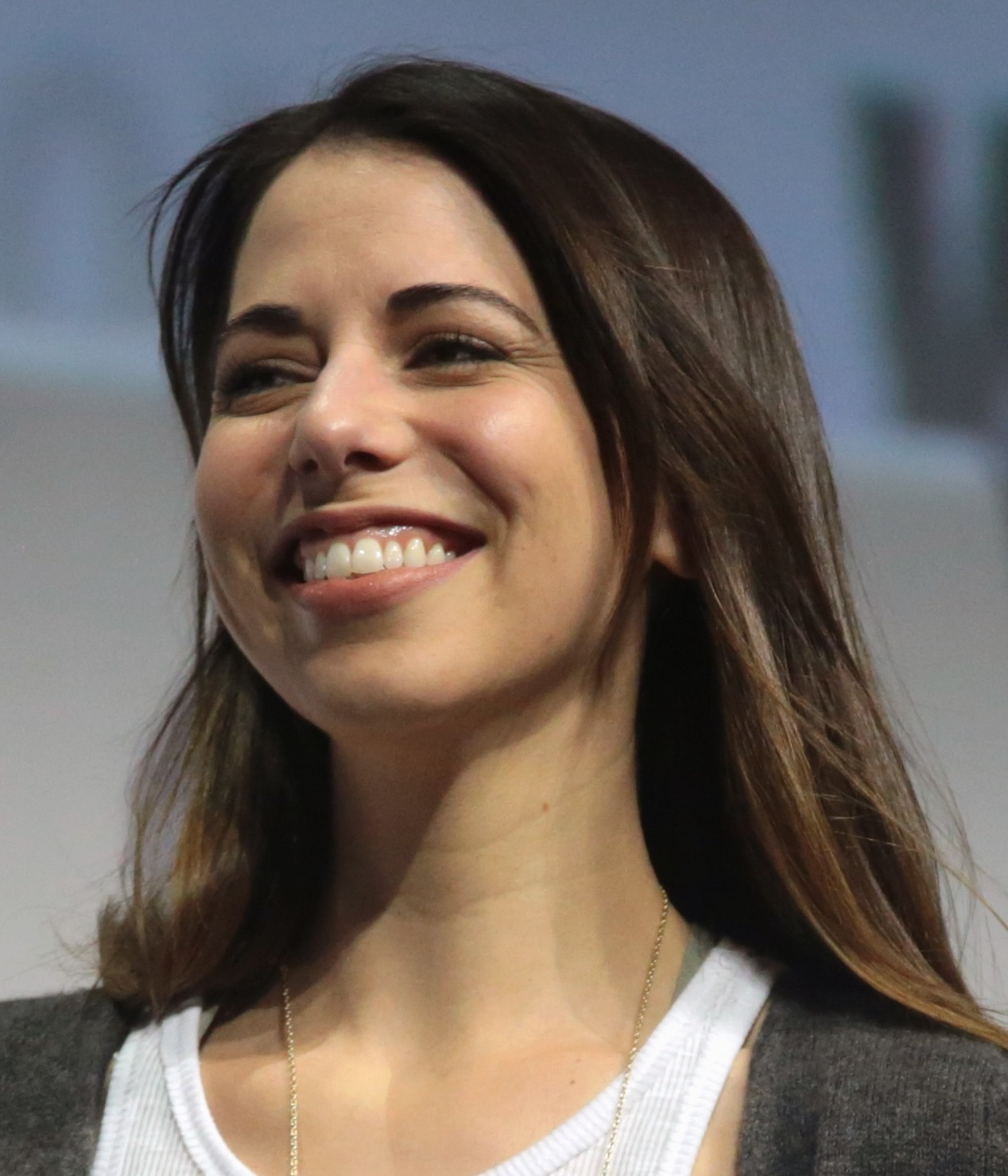
Laura Bailey

Black and Bailey reprised their roles as Chloe Frazer and Nadine Ross, respectively, in The Lost Legacy.

The team experimented with using Nathan Drake, the protagonist of previous Uncharted games, as a secondary character, but found that it "felt superfluous". Several other characters were also considered as protagonists, including Charlie Cutter, Nathan's daughter Cassie, Nathan's brother Sam Drake and friend Victor Sullivan; the team felt Sullivan's age would hinder gameplay. They decided to follow Chloe Frazer and Nadine Ross, who first appeared in Uncharted 2: Among Thieves (2009) and Uncharted 4, respectively. The team opted to focus on new relationships with established secondary characters in the Uncharted series, a departure from Left Behind (2014), the downloadable content (DLC) for The Last of Us (2013), which instead focused on a "missing chunk of the story". They originally envisioned the length of The Lost Legacy to be similar to Left Behind; as development progressed, they realized the game would be larger, and it became a standalone title instead of DLC, with an estimated length of over 10 hours.

Claudia Black and Laura Bailey portrayed Chloe and Nadine, respectively, in The Lost Legacy, reprising their roles from previous entries in the series. The actors' performances were mostly recorded using motion capture, with the remaining audio elements recorded later in a studio. Video recording also captures the actors' faces, for animators to later construct. The game's actors regularly contributed to the development of the characters; co-writer Josh Scherr found that the actors were more familiar with the character motivations, and made changes to the script throughout production. The game was built around Chloe's character, with the narrative and art design reflecting her darker, grounded mindset. When returning to the character, Black was intrigued by the events that took place in her life between Uncharted 3 and The Lost Legacy.

The team placed particular importance on Chloe's design in The Lost Legacy, maintaining familiar elements like her ponytail, but displaying minor signs of aging, including wrinkles. Her design and fighting style is different from Nathan Drake's, and her animations were altered as a result. The team found Chloe's character interesting as her moral compass is a "little bit less directed" than Nathan's; while she would previously seek artifacts for the reward, she is interested in the history of the Tusk of Ganesh due to its relevance to her family, and Scherr found this interesting to explore. They were also interested in exploring Chloe's coping mechanism from previous games: while she would previously escape a dangerous situation to save herself, in The Lost Legacy she is forced to persevere due to her leadership. The team felt that Chloe would require a partner with military expertise, and Nadine would be desperate for more work following Uncharted 4. The pairing of the characters interested the team due to their vast differences: Chloe is "spontaneous and impulsive", whereas Nadine is structured, and they need to overcome their differences to work together. The writers felt that the banter between the characters required subtlety over previous series entries; during development, they sometimes found that the dialogue was "too friendly", and altered the script as a result.

The game's antagonist, Asav, is portrayed by Usman Ally. When preparing for the role, Ally met with Escayg to discuss experiences with "despotic regimes that had their roots in what was perceived as a noble cause". Escayg compared Asav to Mexican medical surgeon José Manuel Mireles, having seen the documentary Cartel Land (2015); Ally described Mireles as "someone who had the charisma and belief in his people to rise and lead a revolution of sorts", noting that Asav possesses a similar mindset and weaknesses. Ally found that relating to historical revolutionaries allowed him to better understand the character's logic.

Scherr and Escayg wrote the game's story. While previous Uncharted games followed specific historic figures, such as Marco Polo and Henry Avery, The Lost Legacy instead focuses on the region, and the surrounding philosophy and culture, due to the shorter development time allowing less intensive research. The writers particularly focused on Hinduism and the surrounding mythology when researching for the story. With The Lost Legacy, the team aimed to include the "slightly more fantastical feel" from the first three Uncharted games, which was absent from Uncharted 4 due to the grounded story. Escayg found that the game's smaller scope allowed a better opportunity to explore each character, and their stories and viewpoints. He also attempted to demonstrate the characters' emotional state through gameplay. The story of The Lost Legacy allowed the team to explore gameplay elements scrapped from Uncharted 4.

=== Art design and gameplay ===
While some of the large open areas of Uncharted 4 were limited by the game's development schedule, Naughty Dog updated the production process to allow up to five teams to develop one location at a time for The Lost Legacy. The natural diversity of the Western Ghats area also allowed the team to explore different settings, including jungles, mountains, temples, and large urban environments. The iconography and deities of India were also appealing to the team.

The team reworked the combat mechanics of Uncharted to better fit Chloe's size and fighting style; while Nathan fought like a brawler, Chloe utilizes more martial arts techniques. While players can control the character and camera in the game, the team orchestrates gameplay elements to construct specific shots. Art director Tate Mosesian said that "there's very little that's random". The team sought to "take advantage" of color when composing shots in the game. The team purchased a lock picking set during development, to assist with the implementation of the in-game lock-picking mechanics.

== Reception ==
=== Critical response ===
Reception

Aggregate score
Aggregator	Score
Metacritic	84/100

Review scores
Publication	Score
Destructoid	9/10
Electronic Gaming Monthly	8.5/10
Game Informer	9/10
GameRevolution	4/5
GameSpot	9/10
GamesRadar+	4/5
GamesTM	9/10
Giant Bomb	4/5
IGN	7.5/10
Polygon	8.5/10
VideoGamer.com	7/10

Uncharted: The Lost Legacy received "generally favorable" reviews, according to review aggregator website Metacritic. Eurogamer ranked the game 18th on their list of the "Top 50 Games of 2017", GamesRadar+ ranked it tenth on their list of the 25 Best Games of 2017, and EGMNow ranked it 21st in their list of the 25 Best Games of 2017, while Polygon ranked it 47th on their list of the 50 best games of 2017. The game was nominated for "Best PlayStation 4 Game", "Best Action-Adventure Game", "Best Graphics" and "Best Story" in IGN's Best of 2017 Awards; and won the award for "Best Graphics" in Game Informer's 2017 Action Game of the Year Awards.

=== Sales ===
Uncharted: The Lost Legacy sold 23,131 copies on PlayStation 4 within its first week on sale in Japan, which placed it at number four on the all-format sales chart. On the week of its release, Lost Legacy topped the UK video game sales chart, later selling 48,000 digital copies within 5 weeks of its release. By 2023, the game had sold 5.2 million copies.

=== Accolades ===
Year	Award	Category	Result	Ref.
2017	Gamescom 2017	Best Console Game (PlayStation 4)	Nominated	
2017	The Independent Game Developers' Association Awards	Audio Design	Nominated	
2017	The Independent Game Developers' Association Awards	Action and Adventure Game	Nominated	
2017	The Independent Game Developers' Association Awards	Diversity Award	Nominated	
2017	Golden Joystick Awards	Best Storytelling	Nominated	
2017	Golden Joystick Awards	Best Gaming Performance (Claudia Black)	Nominated	
2017	Golden Joystick Awards	PlayStation Game of the Year	Nominated	
2017	The Game Awards 2017	Best Performance (Claudia Black)	Nominated	
2017	The Game Awards 2017	Best Performance (Laura Bailey)	Nominated	
2017	The Game Awards 2017	Best Action/Adventure Game	Nominated	
2018	New York Game Awards 2018	Herman Melville Award for Best Writing	Nominated	
2018	New York Game Awards 2018	Great White Way Award for Best Acting in a Game (Claudia Black)	Nominated	
2018	45th Annie Awards	Outstanding Achievement for Character Animation in a Video Game	Nominated	
2018	16th Visual Effects Society Awards	Outstanding Visual Effects in a Real-Time Project	Nominated	
2018	21st Annual D.I.C.E. Awards	Adventure Game of the Year	Nominated	
2018	21st Annual D.I.C.E. Awards	Outstanding Achievement in Animation	Nominated	
2018	21st Annual D.I.C.E. Awards	Outstanding Achievement in Character (Chloe Frazer)	Nominated	
2018	21st Annual D.I.C.E. Awards	Outstanding Achievement in Game Direction	Nominated	
2018	21st Annual D.I.C.E. Awards	Outstanding Achievement in Sound Design	Nominated	
2018	2018 National Academy of Video Game Trade Reviewers Awards	Animation, Artistic	Nominated	
2018	2018 National Academy of Video Game Trade Reviewers Awards	Art Direction, Contemporary	Nominated	
2018	2018 National Academy of Video Game Trade Reviewers Awards	Camera Direction in a Game Engine	Nominated	
2018	2018 National Academy of Video Game Trade Reviewers Awards	Direction in a Game Cinema	Nominated	
2018	2018 National Academy of Video Game Trade Reviewers Awards	Game, Franchise Adventure	Won	
2018	2018 National Academy of Video Game Trade Reviewers Awards	Lighting/Texturing	Nominated	
2018	2018 National Academy of Video Game Trade Reviewers Awards	Performance in a Drama, Lead (Claudia Black)	Nominated	
2018	2018 National Academy of Video Game Trade Reviewers Awards	Performance in a Drama, Lead (Laura Bailey)	Nominated	
2018	2018 National Academy of Video Game Trade Reviewers Awards	Performance in a Drama, Supporting (Troy Baker)	Nominated	
2018	2018 National Academy of Video Game Trade Reviewers Awards	Sound Editing in a Game Cinema	Won	
2018	2018 Italian Video Game Awards	People's Choice	Nominated	
2018	2018 Italian Video Game Awards	Best Character (Nadine)	Nominated	
2018	2018 SXSW Gaming Awards	Excellence in SFX	Nominated	
2018	2018 SXSW Gaming Awards	Excellence in Technical Achievement	Nominated	
2018	16th Annual Game Audio Network Guild Awards	Audio of the Year	Nominated	
2018	16th Annual Game Audio Network Guild Awards	Sound Design of the Year	Nominated	
2018	16th Annual Game Audio Network Guild Awards	Best Cinematic/Cutscene Audio	Won	
2018	16th Annual Game Audio Network Guild Awards	Best Dialogue	Won	
2018	16th Annual Game Audio Network Guild Awards	Best Audio Mix	Won	
2018	14th British Academy Games Awards	Artistic Achievement	Nominated	
2018	14th British Academy Games Awards	Audio Achievement	Nominated	
2018	14th British Academy Games Awards	Performer (Claudia Black)	Nominated	
2018	14th British Academy Games Awards	Performer (Laura Bailey)	Nominated	
2018	2018 Webby Awards	Best Music/Sound Design (People's Voice)	Won	
