= Easy's Waltz =

American film

- Directed by: Nic Pizzolatto
- Written by: Nic Pizzolatto
- Produced by: Christopher Lemole; Tim Zajaros; Margot Hand; Nic Pizzolatto
- Starring: Vince Vaughn; Al Pacino; Kate Mara; Simon Rex; Shania Twain; Cobie Smulders; Mary Steenburgen; Timothy Simons; Fred Melamed; Sophia Ali
- Cinematography: Nigel Bluck
- Edited by: Leo Trombetta; Peter Teschner
- Music by: Keefus Ciancia
- Production companies: Picture Films; Armory Films
- Release date: September 11, 2025 (TIFF)
- Running time: 103 minutes
- Country: United States
- Language: English

Easy's Waltz is a 2025 American drama film written and directed by Nic Pizzolatto in his feature film directorial debut. The film stars Vince Vaughn and Al Pacino.

The film premiered at the Toronto International Film Festival as a Special Presentation, on September 11, 2025 and is currently looking for distribution.

== Premise ==
A down-on-his-luck Las Vegas crooner is offered a shot at the big time and navigates the city with old-school Vegas personalities.

== Cast ==
- Vince Vaughn as Easy
- Al Pacino as Mickey Albano
- Kate Mara as Lucy
- Simon Rex as Sam
- Shania Twain
- Cobie Smulders
- Mary Steenburgen
- Timothy Simons
- Fred Melamed
- Sophia Ali
- Shane Gillis
- El Hefe

== Release ==
The film had its world premiere at the Toronto International Film Festival on September 11, 2025.

== Reception ==
On the review aggregator website Rotten Tomatoes, 69% of 13 critics' reviews are positive. Metacritic, which uses a weighted average, assigned the film a score of 63 out of 100, based on five critics, indicating "generally favorable" reviews.

For Deadline, critic Pete Hammond writes that the script feels "plucked straight out of the 1970s, maybe even the '50s" but that the film is "richly entertaining."
