= Sophia Ali =

American actress

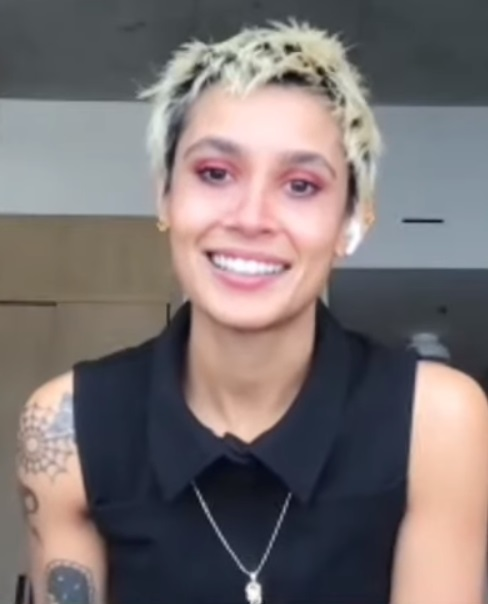
- Ali in 2022
- Born: Sophia Taylor Ali
- Occupation: Actress
- Years active: 2003–present

Sophia Taylor Ali is an American actress. She is best known for her work in the MTV romantic comedy series Faking It, the ABC medical drama series Grey's Anatomy, and The Wilds.

== Early life ==
Although many of Ali's family members practice Islam, her parents did not "nudge her" towards any religion.

Ali was a dancer until the age of 14, and her hobbies include watercolor painting and graffitiing furniture. She has several tattoos.

== Career ==
In 2003, she made her debut on the television show K Street. Ali appeared in a variety of TV shows and films including Faking It, Shake It Up, CSI: Miami, Missionary Man and Famous in Love.

In 2017, Ali was cast in a recurring role as Dr. Dahlia Qadri in the ABC medical drama series Grey's Anatomy. In 2018, Ali appeared as Penelope in the Blumhouse supernatural thriller film Truth or Dare. From 2020 to 2022, she played the role of Fatin Jadmani in the series The Wilds. In 2022, Ali starred in the role of Chloe Frazer in the Uncharted film. The film was released to mixed reviews, with Ali's performance receiving praise.

In 2025, Ali was cast as Maddy in the thriller film Find Your Friends directed by Izabel Pakzad and appeared in the drama film Easy's Waltz.

== Filmography ==
=== Film ===
Year	Title	Role	Note
2007	Missionary Man	American Indian Kid	
2008	The Longshots	Girl #1	
2015	The Walking Deceased	Brooklyn	
2016	Everybody Wants Some!!	Beverly's Roommate	
2016	Mono	Brooke	
2017	Bad Kids of Crestview Academy	Faith Jackson	
2018	Truth or Dare	Penelope Amari	
2019	How's the World Treating You?	Cam	
2021	India Sweets and Spices	Alia Kapur	
2022	Uncharted	Chloe Frazer	
2022	Mouthpiece	Ophelia	Short
2023	The Sperm Bank	Nurse Kirby	Short
2024	Persona	Sam	
2025	Find Your Friends	Maddy	
2025	Easy's Waltz		
TBA	Above the Line †	Princess	Post-production

=== Television ===
Year	Title	Role	Note
2006	Barney & Friends	Self	Recurring role; 3 episodes and short films
2010	Shake It Up!	Tasha	Episode: "Meatball It Up"
2011	CSI: Miami	Samantha Downey	Episode: "Stoned Cold"
2012	Melissa & Joey	Scarlett	Episode: "All Up In My Business"
2014	Tyrant	Samira Nadal	Episode: "Pilot"
2016	Faking It	Sabrina	Recurring role; 5 episodes
2017	The Mindy Project	Parvati	Episode: "May Divorce Be with You"
2017–2019	Grey's Anatomy	Dr. Dahlia Qadri	Recurring role; 27 episodes
2018	The Mick	Alexis	Episode: "The Juice"
2018	Famous in Love	Joanie	4 episodes
2020–2022	The Wilds	Fatin Jadmani	Main role (18 episodes)
2021–2022	Mira, Royal Detective	Khushy (voice)	2 episodes
2024	Chicago Med	Dr. Zola Ahmad	Recurring role (season 9); 6 episodes

=== Web ===
Year	Title	Role	Note
2016	The Disappearing Girl	Leone	2 episodes
2018	Grey's Anatomy: B-Team	Dr. Dahlia Qadri	3 episodes

=== Music videos ===
Year	Title	Artist(s)	Ref.
2018	"Honest"	Drake Bell	
2019	"Not Ok"	Kygo & Chelsea Cutler	
