= Izabel Pakzad =

American actress and director

- Born: January 2, 1996 (age 30); New York, U.S.
- Education: Pennsylvania State University (BA); University of Southern California (MS)
- Occupations: Actress, filmmaker
- Years active: 2017–present
- Works: Find Your Friends

Izabel Pakzad (born January 2, 1996) is an American actress and filmmaker.

== Early Life ==
Pakzad was born in New York to an Iranian father and a Greek mother.

== Career ==
Pakzad has had roles in the TV series The Deuce and Baker's Dozen, as well as the film Birds of Prey.

In 2022, Pakzad wrote, directed and starred in the short film Don’t Worry, It’s Gonna Be OK. The film won Best Short at the 2022 LA Film Festival. In 2025, she wrote and directed the film Find Your Friends.

== Personal life ==
Pakzad has been in a relationship with actor James Franco since 2017.
