= Elena Fisher =

Fictional character in the Uncharted series

- Uncharted character
- Elena Fisher in Uncharted 4: A Thief's End (2016)
- First appearance: Uncharted: Drake's Fortune (2007)
- Last appearance: Uncharted 4: A Thief's End (2016)
- Created by: Amy Hennig
- Voiced by: Emily Rose
- Motion capture: Emily Rose

In-universe information
- Occupation: Reporter
- Spouse: Nathan Drake
- Children: Cassie Drake
- Nationality: American

Elena Fisher is a fictional character in the Uncharted series, developed by Naughty Dog. Elena appears in four video games in the main series: Uncharted: Drake's Fortune, Uncharted 2: Among Thieves, Uncharted 3: Drake's Deception, and the final installment in the main series, Uncharted 4: A Thief's End. While partially playable for short sections of the first game, Elena also acts as both a sidekick and love interest for Nathan Drake. Emily Rose both provided her voice and did the motion capture work for the character.

Though originally a brunette, Naughty Dog made her a blonde with a more severe chin before the first game's release. She is an independent, strong female who acts as an equal to the series' protagonist Drake. In the games, she is a reporter who accompanies Drake on his adventures. Reception of her character has been mostly positive. She has been called one of the strongest video game females and her equality with male characters has been praised; however, the character has drawn criticism for her unrealistic combat prowess.

== Creation and conception ==
Elena was originally a brunette.

Emily Rose, Elena's voice actor, also performed the motion capture work for the character, acting as if performing in a movie. Motion capture was done on a soundstage, and the dialog was recorded while the scenes were being performed. Elena was meant to act as both a sidekick and a romantic interest for the main series protagonist Nathan Drake.

Originally, Elena was presented as a brunette with a soft face. However, close to the release of the first game, Uncharted: Drake's Fortune, her chin was further defined, and her hair made blonde. When questioned about the purpose of the change response, Sony said "they just preferred her blonde". Naughty Dog further elaborated on the reasons for the change, saying that towards the end of development the team's pixel shaders improved and when they added it to Elena's blonde hair, it looked considerably better paired than it did with brown, as it was originally. They stated that the change was purely cosmetic as she remained exactly the same character except now with blonde hair and that these changes are all part of game development.

Elena Fisher is the "female version of Drake", as creator Amy Hennig put it; she is just as charming, intelligent and tenacious as him, and can hold her own when climbing or under fire. Rose, the character's voice actor, commented that Elena matured between the first game and the sequel: "In the first game, she's a lot younger, she's a lot more naive, and she looks at things as being very possible, and in the second (game), has seen murders and adventure...the way that any person grows, you see that in her. She's a little bit more hesitant, a little more cynical".

In the first game, Elena wears a dirty purple tank-top and cargo shorts, with a white tank top underneath. For the remaining games, she wears a number of articles of clothing, including button up shirts, casual shirts, khaki pants, jeans, and a parka.

== Appearances ==
In the 2007 game Uncharted: Drake's Fortune, Elena follows Drake around, videotaping his findings for her cable television show. As the game opens, she and Drake uncover the coffin of Drake's ancestor Sir Francis Drake, which Drake located from coordinates inscribed on Francis's ring he wears around his neck. The coffin contains Sir Francis Drake's diary, which gives the location of El Dorado. Pirates attack and destroy Drake's boat, but Drake's friend Victor Sullivan rescues the two. Once safe, Sully and Drake decide to ditch Elena and go after the treasure, though she manages to rendezvous with Drake after he discovers that El Dorado is a giant gold idol. On the way to the island, anti-aircraft fire forces Elena and Drake to bail out of the airplane and they are separated. Once they meet, they discover that Sully, who appeared to die of a gunshot wound, is alive. After discovering that the statue is cursed and he must stop Atoq Navarro from using its power, and save Elena in the process. After doing so, she, Drake, and Sully drive off in a boat loaded with several chests of treasure.

In Uncharted 2: Among Thieves, Drake stumbles upon Elena by accident in Nepal, where she now acts as an investigative journalist. She and a cameraman are attempting to prove that war criminal Lazarevic is alive, contrary to the beliefs of NATO. Drake is trying to stop Lazarević from finding the entrance to Shambhala and the legendary Cintamani stone. After she, Drake and the party find a temple (which conceals the secret map to Shambala), Elena and her cameraman are ambushed, and the cameraman, Jeff, is eventually executed by Lazarevic. Elena and Drake escape, and she helps him catch Lazarevic's train. The pair find each other in a remote mountain village in Tibet, where the two meet Karl Schäfer, a German who had led a Schutzstaffel expedition to Shambhala, who he ended up killing in order to stop them from obtaining the Cintamani Stone. Drake and Elena track Lazaravic to a monastery, where they find the entrance to Shambhala. Once inside, they discover that the monsters Drake has been seeing in the area are guardians of the city. Drake and Elena are apprehended by Lazaravic but escape him when the guardians attack. After battling through several guardians and many henchmen left behind by Lazaveric, she, Nate, and Chloe spot the Tree of Life, upon at that moment Flynn confronts Drake and attempts to kill the party (and himself) with a grenade. He fails, although he severely wounds Elena (as well as lightly wounding Drake and Chloe). After leaving Elena in Chloe's care, Drake confronts Lazaravic at the Tree of Life, the sap of which comprises the Cintamani stone. Drake wounds Lazaravic, leaving the guardians to kill him, and returns to the village, where he and Elena kiss and begin a relationship.

Uncharted 3: Drake's Deception reveals that, between the events of Uncharted 2 and 3, Elena and Drake had married each other but had eventually separated, though she still wears her ring. Since the events of Uncharted 2, Elena has become an international news correspondent, and has been stationed in Yemen for some time. She assists Nate and Sully in entering Yemen and helps locate a cistern leading to catacombs that contains the coordinates to Iram of the Pillars. Elena tries in vain to deter Nate from continuing his search as she feels it is not worth it. After Nate is drugged and captured by Marlowe, he reunites with Elena who reveals Sully has also been kidnapped and that she has a plan to save him. They infiltrate a nearby airport where a plane is ready to make a supply drop to the enemy convoy Sully is in. Elena assists Drake in getting onto the plane, departing him as it takes off. After Nate and Sully return from Ubar, Elena is shown by Nate that he has started wearing his wedding ring again after Sully had kept it safe for him and they resume their relationship, leaving together on Sully's new plane.

In Uncharted 4: A Thief's End, five years after the events of Drake's Deception, Elena and Nate are living as a married couple in New Orleans. She continues to work as a journalist and often travels abroad writing articles, while Nate works as a salvager. Nate lies to Elena by claiming he has taken on a new salvaging job after his long-lost brother Sam returns to coax him back into uncovering the treasure of pirate Henry Avery. After escaping enemy forces in Madagascar, Nate returns to his hotel only to find Elena there, who confronts Nate about his lies and dismisses his explanations. Upset, confused, and angry, she returns home on her own. After some consideration, Elena later goes to Libertalia with Sully and rescues Nate, hoping that his dishonesty will help to make them more trusting of each other in the future, and in the end they reconcile with a kiss. The couple eventually find Sam, who insists that they go after the treasure before their opponents can find it but Nate, Elena, and Sully decline his request as they only came to rescue him. Nate is forced to leave Elena with Sully after Sam decides to go after the treasure alone. The four later reunite on Sully's plane, having escaped Libertalia alive. Sam later departs with Sully, Nate and Elena return to their lives and Elena decides to buy the 'Jameson Marine' salvage company, installing Nate as a co-owner to help them in their funding for their future adventures. Elena also expresses her desire to revive her old TV show.

13–15 years after the events of Uncharted 4 the two are still happily married and have settled down at a beach house with a daughter named Cassie and a dog called Vicky. The story then ends with Nate and Elena setting off on a sailing trip while beginning to tell Cassie about their previous adventures.

Elena also appears in the prequel comic Eye of Indra, agreeing to fund Nate's expedition to find Sir Francis Drake's coffin.

Mircea Monroe played Elena in the 2018 live action fan film.

== Reception ==
Reception to the character of Elena Fisher has been mainly positive. Blaine Kyllo of The Georgia Straight praised Rose's performance as Elena, calling it some of the best work in video gaming, while Meagan VanBurkleo of Game Informer called Elena one of her "favorite leading ladies". In its 2010 cover feature, Game Informer also named Elena as one of 30 characters "who defined a decade".

Some opined that Elena is a strong, female lead uncommon to video games. Dave Meikleham of GamesRadar UK called her one of the strongest females in gaming and wrote she provides a great playoff to Drake, and a good shot to aid the players through levels. However, he also criticized her for a lack of realism, finding it hard to believe that as a reporter who had never fired a gun before could so quickly become such an accurate, fearless shot. IGN named her the fourth best video game heroine, praising Naughty Dog for creating a female protagonist equal in every way to her male counterpart: "She won't let the camera stop rolling, she won't take Drake's crap, and she's not afraid to throw a punch. When you're pinned down by enemy fire, Elena will cap the bad guys for you. When Drake's trapped in the enemy camp, Elena will rip walls down to save her friend. When you're in need of a solid, fleshed-out character, Elena's there as a prime example". Game Informer named her one of the 30 characters who defined a decade. Similarly, GamesRadar's staff placed her at number 24 in a list of the 50 best game characters of the generation, commenting that "she may be a stereotypical twenty-something journalist at face value, but she's so convincingly written (and acted by Emily Rose) that she's one of the most believable and likeable characters in all of gaming". Kevin Wong of Complex included her to his "best supporting character in video games", and stated that "Serving as a perfect foil is reporter Elena Fisher, a modern April O'Neill who's in over her head. Despite this, however, she knows how to cover and shoot – she saves Nathan's hide more than once. Dumb blonde? Hell no – this gal's got brains."

The character has also garnered attention for her attractiveness. Bret Dawson of the Toronto Star compared Elena's appearance and mannerisms to those of Jennifer Aniston.
