= Uncharted Live Action Fan Film =

2018 short film by Allan Ungar

- Thumbnail of the short film
- Directed by: Allan Ungar
- Written by: Allan Ungar; Jesse Wheeler
- Based on: Uncharted by Naughty Dog
- Produced by: Nathan Fillion; Allan Ungar; Jesse Wheeler; Bruno Marino; Louis Sallerson
- Starring: Nathan Fillion; Stephen Lang; Geno Segers; Mircea Monroe; Ernie Reyes Jr.
- Cinematography: Alex Chinnici
- Edited by: Allan Ungar
- Music by: Aaron Gilhuis; Jacob Shea
- Release date: July 16, 2018
- Running time: 14 minutes
- Country: United States
- Language: English

The Uncharted Live Action Fan Film is a 2018 American action adventure short film based on the Uncharted video game series by Naughty Dog. Directed by Allan Ungar and written by Ungar and Jesse Wheeler, it was released on YouTube on July 16, 2018, and stars Nathan Fillion, Stephen Lang, Geno Segers, Mircea Monroe, and Ernie Reyes Jr.

== Synopsis ==
Treasure hunter Nathan Drake finds himself captured while searching for the lost treasure of the Flor de la Mar.

== Cast ==
- Nathan Fillion as Nathan Drake
- Stephen Lang as Victor Sullivan
- Geno Segers as Diego
- Mircea Monroe as Elena Fisher
- Ernie Reyes Jr. as El Tigre

== Production ==
Allan Ungar and Nathan Fillion were introduced to one another by a mutual friend in January 2018 after Ungar expressed interest in speaking to Fillion about the project, which was based on the Uncharted video game series developed by Naughty Dog. Principal photography on the film began May 7 in Los Angeles, California and lasted for five days. The opening scenes were shot in Palmdale, California and the exteriors of the mansion were shot in Santa Clarita. The interiors were shot in Beverly Hills while the final scene was shot in Malibu, California. Fillion trained for the role and also performed most of his own stunts. According to Fillion and Ungar, most of the crew did not know what they were working on until Fillion showed up in wardrobe because the production was set up under the fake title Breaking and Entering, which is a reference to a chapter in Uncharted 2: Among Thieves.

== Release ==
Fillion released the film through Twitter, Instagram and YouTube, after dropping some teases on his social media handles. It reached over 2 million views in its first two days. Since its release, fans have taken to social media campaigning for Netflix or YouTube Premium to turn it into a digital series.

== Reception ==
Critical reception for the Uncharted Live Action Fan Film has been positive, with journalists, fans, and bloggers praising Fillion's performance as well as Ungar's direction. The Verge called it "film's only good video game adaptation" while Kotaku labelled it as "just about everything you’d want from an Uncharted movie: witty quips, fun twists, esoteric history references, and even a pivot to Video Game Mode for a gun fight". Phil Hornshaw of The Wrap said "Ungar’s fan film pretty perfectly captures the feel of the game series, which has always carried the feel of a big-budget summer blockbuster movie. Fillion is a good fit for the role of the wise-cracking and amiable Drake; Stephen Lang (Avatar, Don't Breathe) takes on the role of Sully in the fan film, and Mircea Monroe (Episodes) plays Elena. The script is dead-on "Uncharted", cutting from Nate firing off a bunch of jokes to a quick history lesson about 16th century conqueror Afonso de Albuquerque and explorer Ferdinand Magellan". BuzzFeed was one of the many outlets that advocated for the short to turn into something more.

Naughty Dog vice president Neil Druckmann and franchise creator Amy Hennig both shared their support on social media along with many other gaming creators.
