= List of multimedia franchises originating in games, toys, and merchandise =

Following is a list of multimedia franchises originating in games, toys, and merchandise.

In the following tables, the initial media through which the franchise characters or settings became known is shown in boldface. Only works of fiction are considered part of the series; a book or a documentary film about the franchise is not itself an installment in the franchise.

== Franchises originating in video games ==
=== Including film and/or television works ===
Franchise (creator)	Literature	Comics	Animated films	Live action films	Animated TV	Live action TV	Video games	Other media
Ace Attorney (Capcom)	yes	yes	no	Ace Attorney (2012)	Ace Attorney (2016–2019)	no	**Phoenix Wright: Ace Attorney** (2005) several sequels and spin-offs	Stage play, soundtracks albums, drama CD, Figurines and various other merchandise
Alone In The Dark (Atari SA, THQ Nordic)	no	Life is a Hideous Thing (2002)	no	Alone In The Dark (2005); Alone In The Dark II (2008)	no	no	**Alone in the Dark** (1992) several other sequels and reboots	various merchandise
Animal Crossing (Nintendo)	no	yes	Dōbutsu no Mori (2006)	no	no	no	**Animal Crossing** (2001) numerous sequels and spin-offs	other merchandise
Angry Birds (Rovio Entertainment)	yes	yes	The Angry Birds Movie (2016); The Angry Birds Movie 2 (2019) The Angry Birds Movie 3 (2026)	no	Angry Birds Toons (2013–present); Piggy Tales (2014)	no	**Angry Birds** (2009) several sequels and spin-offs	theme parks, toys, food products
Assassin's Creed (Ubisoft Montreal)	Assassin's Creed (book series)	various	animated shorts	Assassin's Creed: Lineage (2009) (short); Assassin's Creed (2016)	no	no	**Assassin's Creed** (2007) numerous sequels and spin-offs	
Aikatsu!(Bandai)	yes	yes	Aikatsu! The Movie (2014) several films	no	Aikatsu! (2012-2016) several series	no	**Aikatsu!** (2012) several spin-offs	Card games, Drama CDs, Soundtrack albums
Bayonetta (Platinumgames)	no	no	Bayonetta: Bloody Fate (2013)	no	no	no	**Bayonetta** (2009); **Bayonetta 2** (2014)	Artbooks, Guidbooks, Soundtrack and other merchandise
Bomberman (Hudson Soft; Konami)	no	Bomberman B-Daman Bakugaiden (1998–1999); Bomberman Jetters (2002–2003)	no	no	Bomberman B-Daman Bakugaiden (1998–1999); Bomberman Jetters (2002–2003)	no	**Bomberman** (1983) several sequels and spin offs	collectibles, toys, and numerous other merchandise
Borderlands (2k Take-Two Interactive)	yes	various	no	Borderlands (2024)	no	no	**Borderlands** (2009) various sequels and spin-offs	Soundtracks, Tabletop games, and various other merchandise
Call of Duty (Activision)	no	various	no	Find Makarov: Operation Kingfish (2011) short film	no	no	**Call of Duty** (2003) numerous sequels, series and spin-offs	Songs, action figures, card games and several other merchandise
Castlevania (Konami)	no	yes	no	no	Castlevania (2017–2021)	no	**Castlevania** (1986) numerous sequels and spin-offs	action figures, collectibles, pachinko games
Carmen Sandiego (Broderbund)	John Peel book series (1991–1993); Carmen Sandiego Mystery (1997) and other book and novels	DC Comics comic series (1996–1997)	Where in the Universe Is Carmen Sandiego? (1999) planetarium film Carmen Sandiego: To Steal or Not to Steal Short film	Carmen Sandiego (TBA)	Where on Earth Is Carmen Sandiego? (1994–1999); Netflix Animated series (2019–2021)	Where in the World Is Carmen Sandiego (1991–1995); Where in Time Is Carmen Sandiego (1996–1997)	**Where in the World Is Carmen Sandiego?** (1985); Numerous video games	Board games Concerts; Carmen Sandiego Day
Chrono (Square Enix)	no	Dimensional Adventure Numa Monjar (1996)	no	no	Dimensional Adventure Numa Monjar OVA (1996)	no	**Chrono Trigger** (1995); Chrono Cross (1999)	Various Merchandise
Crash Bandicoot (Naughty Dog, Activision)	no	yes	no	no	Crash Bandicoot: No Use Crying; Crash Bandicoot Monster Truck; Crash Bandicoot – Titan Idol Crash Bandicoot – Have Another (2007) web short series	no	**Crash Bandicoot** (1996) several other sequels and spin-offs	Action figures, toys, collectibles and various other merchandise
Dante's Inferno (Visceral Games, Electronic Arts)	no	yes	Dante's Inferno: An Animated Epic (2010)	no	no	no	**Dante's Inferno** (2010)	
Danganronpa (Kazutaka Kodaka)	Danganronpa Zero several novels	several mangas	Super Danganronpa 2.5: Nagito Komaeda and the Destroyer of Worlds (2017)	no	Danganronpa: The Animation (2013); Danganronpa 3: The End of Hope's Peak High School (2016)	no	**Danganronpa: Trigger Happy Havoc** (2010); Sequels, Spin-offs and a Remake	Theatrical plays
Darkstalkers (Capcom)	yes	various	no	no	Night Warriors: Darkstalkers' Revenge (1997–1998); Darkstalkers (1995)	no	**Darkstalkers: The Night Warriors** (1994) several sequels	Soundtracks, art books and other merchandise
Dead or Alive (Tomonobu Itagaki)	no	no	no	DOA: Dead or Alive (2006)	no	no	**Dead or Alive** (1996) several sequels and spin-offs Dead or Alive Xtreme series	Various Merchandise
Dead Rising (Capcom)	no	yes	no	Zombrex: Dead Rising Sun (2010); Dead Rising: Watchtower (2015); Dead Rising: Endgame (2016)	no	no	**Dead Rising** (2006) several sequels, spin-offs and re-releases	Figure actions, soundtracks and other merchandise
Dead Space (Glen Schofield)	2 novels	various	Dead Space: Downfall (2008); Dead Space: Aftermath (2011)	no	no	no	**Dead Space** (2008) numerous sequels and spin-offs	
Devil May Cry (Capcom)	Devil May Cry novels	Devil May Cry manga series Devil May Cry comic book series	no	no	Devil May Cry: The Animated Series (2007)	no	**Devil May Cry** (2001) several sequels	
Doom (id Software)	Doom novels	Doom (1996)	no	Doom (2005); Doom: Annihilation (2019)	no	no	**Doom** (1993) numerous sequels and spin-offs	Doom: The Boardgame
Donkey Kong (Shigeru Miyamoto)	no	yes	no	no	Saturday Supercade (1983); Captain N: The Game Master (1989-1991); Donkey Kong Country (1997-2000)	no	**Donkey Kong** (1981); Numerous video games	Soundtrack songs Amiibo Figures; Theme Park attractions
Dota (Valve)	no	no	no	no	Dota: Dragon's Blood (2021–present)	no	**Dota 2** (2013); Artifact (2018) spin-off Dota Underlords (2020) Spin-off	
Dragon Age (BioWare)	4 novels	various	Dragon Age: Dawn of the Seeker (2012)	no	no	Dragon Age: Redemption (2011)	**Dragon Age: Origins** (2009) numerous sequels and spin-offs	other media
Dragon Quest (Square Enix)	various	Dragon Quest: The Adventure of Dai (1989–1996) and various others	Dragon Quest Saga – The Crest of Roto (1996); Dragon Quest: Your Story (2019)	no	Dragon Quest The Adventure of Dai (1991–1992); Dragon Quest The Adventure of Dai (2020–present)	no	**Dragon Quest** (1986); Numerous sequels and spin-offs	"Yume wo Shinjite", several other merchandise
Dragon's Lair (Rick Dyer)	no	yes	no	Dragon's Lair (TBA)	Dragon's Lair (1984)	no	**Dragon's Lair** (1983); Sequels	Replica Statue, Action Figures
Drakengard (Square Enix)	various light novels and books	various manga	no	no	Nier: Automata Ver1.1a (2023-2024)	no	**Drakengard** (2003) numerous sequels and spin-offs	CD drama, soundtracks, musical band, stage play and other merchandise
Far Cry (Ubisoft)	yes	yes	no	Far Cry (2008); Inside Eden's Gate (2018)	no	The Far Cry Experience (2012)	**Far Cry** (2004) several sequels and spin-off	board game and other merchandise
Fatal Fury (SNK)	no	no	Fatal Fury: The Motion Picture (1994)	no	Fatal Fury: Legend of the Hungry Wolf (1993); Fatal Fury 2: The New Battle (1994); Memories of Stray Wolves (2006)	no	**Fatal Fury: King of Fighters** (1991) several sequels	
Fatal Frame (Koei Tecmo)	Fatal Frame: A Curse Affecting Only Girls (2014)	Fatal Frame: Shadow Priestess (2014)	no	Gekijōban Zero (2014)	no	no	**Fatal Frame** (2001) other sequels and spin-offs	Zero4D attraction, pachinko games and other merchandise
Fallout (Bethesda)	no	yes	no	no	no	Fallout (2024-)	**Fallout** (1997) several other sequels and spin-offs	tabletop wargame, board games and other merchandise
Final Fantasy (Hironobu Sakaguchi)	various	various	several	no	yes	Final Fantasy XIV: Dad of Light (2017)	**Final Fantasy** (1987) numerous sequels and spin-offs	music
Fire Emblem (Nintendo)	no	various	no	no	Two animated OVA	no	**Fire Emblem: Shadow Dragon and the Blade of Light** (1990); Several other sequels and spin-offs	Amiibo Figures, Trade Card Games and other merchandise
Five Nights at Freddy's (Scott Cawthon)	various	Graphic novels based on novels and short stories anthology	no	Five Nights at Freddy's (2023); Five Nights at Freddy's 2 (2025)	no	no	**Five Nights at Freddy's** (2014) numerous sequels and spin-offs	Merchandise, Theme parks attractions, Tabletop games
Talking Tom & Friends (Samo Login, Iza Login)	no	no	Talking Tom Shorts (2014–present) short film series	no	Talking Friends (2012); Talking Tom & Friends (2015–2021); Talking Tom and Friends Minis (2016–2018); Talking Tom Heroes (2019–2021)	no	**Talking Tom** (2010) other games and spin offs	Toy Lines and Videoclips
God of War	yes	yes	no	no	no	God of War (in production)	**God of War** (2005) several sequels and side games	music
Grand Theft Auto (Rockstar Games, Take-Two Interactive)	no	no	Grand Theft Auto: San Andreas – The Introduction (2004) short film	GTA 2 – The Movie (1999)	no	no	**Grand Theft Auto** (1997) numerous sequels and spin-offs	Soundtracks, guidebooks and other merchandise
Half-Life (Valve)	no	no	no	Half-Life Beyond Black Mesa (2011)	no	no	**Half-Life** (1998); Half-Life: Opposing Force (1999); Half-Life: Blue Shift (2001); Half-Life: Decay (2001) expansion packs Half-Life 2 (2004); Half-Life 2: Episode One (2006); Half-Life 2: Episode Two (2007) expansion packs Half-Life: Alyx (2020)	Soundtracks, guidebooks and other merchandise
Halo (Bungie)	19 novels	various	Halo Legends (2010)	no	no	Halo 4: Forward Unto Dawn (2012); Halo (2022-2024)	**Halo: Combat Evolved** (2001) numerous sequels and spin-offs	music, board game, action figures other media
Hitman (IO Interactive)	no	no	no	Hitman (2007); Hitman: Agent 47 (2015)	no	no	**Hitman: Codename 47** (2000) various other sequels and spin-off	action figures and other merchandise
Kemono Friends (Kemono Friends Project)	yes	Kemono Friends: Welcome to Japari Park! (2015–2017); Kemono Friends à la carte Kemono Friends 2	no	no	Kemono Friends (2017); Kemono Friends 2 (2019)	no	**Kemono Friends** (2015–2016 mobile game) various other mobile games, console game, arcade game	Welcome to Japari Park (2018–2020, net animation) stage musicals, music CDs, audio plays, TCG cards
Kingdom Hearts (Square Enix)	Light novels and various guide books	Several manga	Kingdom Hearts χ Back Cover (2017)	no	TV series in development for the Disney+	no	**Kingdom Hearts** (2002) various sequels	Toys, Figurines, clothes, jewelry, trade card game, soundtracks and various other merchandise
The King of Fighters (SNK)	no	various	no	The King of Fighters (film) (2010)	The King of Fighters: Another Day (2005–2006); The King of Fighters: Destiny (2017)	no	**The King of Fighters '94** (1994) numerous sequels and spinoffs	CDs, collectible card game, pachinko games
Kirby (Masahiro Sakurai)	no	Kirby of the Stars: The Story of Dedede Who Lives in Pupupu (manga 1995–2006); Various (manga)	no	no	Kirby: Right Back at Ya! (2001–2003)	no	**Kirby's Dream Land** (1992) numerous sequels and spin-offs	Kirby Café, clothes, toys
League of Legends (Riot Games)	yes	various	no	no	Arcane (2021)	no	**League of Legends** (2009) several spin-offs	music, tabletop games, other media
The Legend of Zelda (Shigeru Miyamoto, Takashi Tezuka)	various	The Legend of Zelda (manga)	no	The Legend of Zelda (2027)	The Legend of Zelda (1989)	no	**The Legend of Zelda** (1986) numerous sequels and spin-offs	other media
Mario (Shigeru Miyamoto)	Nintendo Gamebooks	various	Super Mario Bros.: The Great Mission to Rescue Princess Peach! (1986); The Super Mario Bros. Movie (2023); The Super Mario Galaxy Movie (2026)	Super Mario Bros. (1993)	several	The Super Mario Bros. Super Show!	**Mario Bros.** (1983) numerous sequels and spin-offs	Music theme, electromechanical games, theme parks, and numerous other merchandise
Pikmin	no	Yes	Pikmin short film series (2014-2025)	no	no	no	**Pikmin** (2001) several sequels and spin-offs	Amiibo figures, merchandise line
Minecraft (Mojang Studios)	yes	Minecraft: The Manga (2020-present) various graphic novels	yes	Minecraft: The Story of Mojang (2012); A Minecraft Movie (2025); A Minecraft Movie Squared (2027)	Untitled Minecraft animated series (TBA)	no	**Minecraft** (2011); Minecraft: Story Mode (2015-2017); Minecraft Education (2016); Minecraft Earth (2019); Minecraft Dungeons (2020); Minecraft Legends (2023)	yes
Mass Effect	Mass Effect: Revelation (2007) several sequels	various	Mass Effect: Paragon Lost (2012)	no	no	no	**Mass Effect** (2007) numerous sequels and spin-offs	board games, action figures
Max Payne (Rockstar Games, Take-Two Interactive)	no	yes	no	Max Payne (2008)	no	no	**Max Payne** (2001); Max Payne 2: The Fall of Max Payne (2003); Max Payne 3 (2012)	"Late Goodbye" song and other merchandise
Mega Man	Mega Man 2	various	no	upcoming	Mega Man (1994–1995); MegaMan NT Warrior (2002–2003); Mega Man Star Force (2006–2007)	no	**Mega Man** (1987) numerous sequels and spin-offs	—
Monster Hunter (Capcom)	no	Monster Hunter Orage (2008–2009)	Monster Hunter: Legends of the Guild (2021)	Monster Hunter (2020)	Monster Hunter Stories: Ride On (2016–2017)	no	**Monster Hunter** (2004) numerous sequels and spin-offs	Monster Hunter Hunting Card and several other merchandise
Mortal Kombat (Ed Boon, John Tobias)	yes	Mortal Kombat (comics)	Mortal Kombat Legends: Scorpion's Revenge (2020)	Mortal Kombat (1995); Mortal Kombat Annihilation (1997); Mortal Kombat (2021) Mortal Kombat II (2026)	Mortal Kombat: Defenders of the Realm (1996)	Mortal Kombat: Konquest (1998); Mortal Kombat: Legacy (2011)	**Mortal Kombat** (1992) numerous sequels	collectible card game, live show, action figures
Pac-Man (Namco)	no	yes	no	no	Pac-Man (TV series) (1982–1983)	no	**Pac-Man** (1980) numerous sequels	collectible card game, live show, action figures
Sekiro: Shadows Die Twice (From Software)	no	Sekiro Side Story: Hanbei the Undying (2020)	Sekiro: No Defeat (2026)	no	Sekiro: No Defeat (2026)	no	**Sekiro: Shadows Die Twice** (2019)	Guide Books and various merchandise
Persona (Atlus)	various	various	Persona 3 The Movie:#1 Spring of Birth (2013); Persona 3 The Movie:#2 Midsummer Knight's Dream (2014); Persona 3 The Movie:#3 Falling Down (2015); Persona 3 The Movie:#4 Winter of Rebirth (2016); Persona 4: The Animation -The Factor of Hope- (2012)	no	Persona: Trinity Soul (2008); Persona 4: The Animation (2011–2012); Persona 4: The Golden Animation (2014); Persona 5: The Animation (2018–2019)	no	**Revelations: Persona** (1996) several sequels and spin-offs	CD Dramas, Stage plays, Persona Stalker Club, Persona 3: The Weird Masquerade, musicals, action figures and numerous other merchandise
Pokémon (Satoshi Tajiri)	yes	Pokémon (manga); Pokémon (newspaper comic)	numerous	Pokémon: Detective Pikachu (2019)	Pokémon (anime) several series	no	**Pokémon Red and Blue** (1996) numerous sequels and spin-offs	collectible card game, collectible miniatures game
Pretty Rhythm (Syn Sophia; Tomy)	no	Pretty Rhythm (2010-2012); Pretty Rhythm: Aurora Dream (2011-2012); Pretty Rhythm: Dear My Future (2012-2013); Pretty Rhythm: Rainbow Live (2013-2014); Pretty Rhythm: All Star Selection (2014)	Pretty Rhythm: All Star Selection Prism Show Best Ten (2014) numerous others	no	Pretty Rhythm: Aurora Dream (2011-2012) numerous others	no	**Pretty Rhythm** (2010) numerous others	-
Prince of Persia (Ubisoft)	yes	yes	no	Prince of Persia: The Sands of Time (2010)	no	no	**Prince of Persia** (1989) several other sequels and spin-offs	Lego collectibles, and other merchandise
Plants vs. Zombies (George Fan; PopCap Games)	no	Plants vs. Zombies comics series (2013-present)	no	no	Plants vs. Zombies (2011-present)	no	**Plants vs. Zombies** (2009); Plants vs. Zombies 2 (2013); Plants vs. Zombies 3 (2024) numerious spin-offs and a remaster	
Ratchet & Clank (Insomniac Games)	no	Ratchet & Clank: Bang Bang Bang! Critical Danger of the Galaxy Legend (2004–2008); Ratchet & Clank (comic) (2010–2011)	Ratchet & Clank (2016)	no	no	no	**Ratchet & Clank** (2002) numerous sequels and spin-offs	various merchandise
Rayman (Michel Ancel, Ubisoft)	no	yes	no	no	Rayman: The Animated Series (1999–2000)	no	**Rayman** (1995) numerous sequels and spin-offs	Toys
Red Dead (Rockstar Games, Take-Two Interactive)	no	no	Red Dead Redemption: The Man from Blackwater (2010) short film	no	no	no	**Red Dead Revolver** (2004); Red Dead Redemption (2010); Red Dead Redemption: Undead Nightmare expansion pack (2010); Red Dead Redemption 2 (2018); Red Dead Online (2019)	Guide Books, Soundtracks and other merchandise
Resident Evil (Capcom)	various	various	Resident Evil: Degeneration (2008); Resident Evil: Damnation (2012)	Resident Evil film series	no	no	**Resident Evil** (1996) numerous sequels and spin-offs	various merchandise
Silent Hill (Konami)	yes	Silent Hill (comics)	no	Silent Hill (2006); Silent Hill: Revelation (2012)	no	no	**Silent Hill** (1999) numerous sequels	various merchandise
Sonic the Hedgehog	yes	various	several	Sonic the Hedgehog (2020); Sonic the Hedgehog 2 (2022); Sonic the Hedgehog 3 (2024); Sonic the Hedgehog 4 (2027)	yes	Knuckles (2024)	**Sonic the Hedgehog** (1991) numerous sequels and spin-offs	Sonic Symphony; Lego Sonic the Hedgehog
Star Ocean (Square Enix)	no	Star Ocean: The Second Story (1998–2001)	no	no	Star Ocean: The Second Story (2001)	no	**Star Ocean** (1996) several other sequels	various merchandise
Star Fox (Nintendo)	no	various	Star Fox Zero – The Battle Begins (2016)	no	no	no	**Star Fox** (1993) numerous sequels	Amiibo Figures and other merchandise
Street Fighter	yes	Street Fighter (1993); Street Fighter (2003–2018, numerous manga)	yes	Street Fighter (1994); Street Fighter: The Legend of Chun-Li (2009); Street Fighter (2026)	yes	Street Fighter: Assassin's Fist (2014–present)	**Street Fighter** (1987) numerous sequels and spin-offs	card game
Tekken	no	Tekken Comic (manga)	Tekken: The Motion Picture (1998); Tekken: Blood Vengeance (2011)	Tekken (2009)	no	no	**Tekken** (1994) numerous sequels and spin-offs	
The Last of Us (PlayStation Studios)	no	The Last of Us: American Dreams (2013)	no	no	no	The Last of Us (2023-)	**The Last of Us** (2013); The Last of Us: Left Behind (2014); The Last of Us Part II (2020)	Artbooks, guidebooks and various other merchandise
Tomb Raider	various	Tomb Raider (comics)	no	Lara Croft: Tomb Raider (2001); Lara Croft: Tomb Raider – The Cradle of Life (2003); Tomb Raider (2018)	Revisioned: Tomb Raider Animated Series (2007)	no	**Tomb Raider** (1996) numerous sequels and spin-offs	amusement park rides, other media
Trails (Nihon Falcom)	yes	yes	yes	no	yes	no	**The Legend of Heroes: Trails in the Sky** (2004) numerous sequels and spin-offs	Manga, anime, audio dramas, stage play, soundtracks, drama CD, figurines and various other merchandise
Onimusha (Capcom)	yes	yes	no	no	Onimusha (2023)	no	**Onimusha Warlords** (2001) various sequels and spin-off	Guide books, soundtracks and other merchandise
Umamusume: Pretty Derby (Cygames)	no	Umamusume: Pretty Derby – Haru Urara Ganbaru! (2016), Starting Gate! Umamusume: Pretty Derby (2017), Umayon (2018), Umamusume: Cinderella Gray (2020), Umamusume: Pretty Derby – Uma Musumeshi (2023), Umamusume: Pretty Derby – Star Blossom (2023), Umamusume: PisuPisu☆SupiSupi Golshi-chan (2023)	Umamusume: Pretty Derby – Beginning of a New Era (2024)	no	Umamusume: Pretty Derby (2018-2023), Umayon (2020), Umayuru (2022-2023), Umamusume: Pretty Derby – Road to the Top (2023), Umamusume: Cinderella Gray (2025), Umayuru: Pretty Gray (2025)	no	**Umamusume: Pretty Derby** (2021); Umamusume: Pretty Derby – Party Dash (2024)	stage play, live events, soundtrack and merchandise
Uncharted (PlayStation Studios)	Uncharted: The Fourth Labyrinth (2011)	Uncharted: Drake's Fortune (2007); Uncharted: Eye of Indra (2009); Uncharted (2011)	no	Uncharted Live Action Fan Film (2018); Uncharted (2022)	no	no	**Uncharted: Drake's Fortune** (2007) several other sequels and spin-offs	Soundtracks and numerous other merchandise
Xeno (Monolith Soft)	no	no	no	no	Xenosaga: The Animation (2007–2008)	no	**Xenogears** (1998) various other sequels and series	Amiibo Figures and other merchandise
Warcraft	various	various	no	Warcraft (2016)	no	no	**Warcraft: Orcs & Humans** (1994) numerous sequels and spin-offs	tabletop games
Wing Commander (Origin Systems)	various	no	no	Wing Commander (1999)	Wing Commander Academy (1996)	no	**Wing Commander** (1990) numerous sequels and spin-offs	collectible card game
Yo-kai Watch (Akihiro Hino)	yes	Manga series (2012-2021)	Yo-kai Watch: The Movie (2014) Yo-kai Watch: Enma Daiō to Itsutsu no Monogatari da Nyan! (2015) Yo-kai Watch: Soratobu Kujira to Double no Sekai no Daibōken da Nyan! (2016) Yo-kai Watch Shadowside: Oni-ō no Fukkatsu (2017) Yo-kai Watch: Forever Friends (2018)	no	Yo-kai Watch (2014-2018) Yo-kai Watch Shadowside (2018–2019) 2019 remake	no	**Yo-kai Watch** (2013) many games and spin offs	toys, merchandise
Zone of the Enders (Hideo Kojima, Konami)	no	no	Zone of the Enders: 2167 Idolo (2001) OVA	no	Z.O.E. Dolores, I (2001)	no	**Zone of the Enders** (2001); Zone of the Enders: The Fist of Mars (2002) spin-off Zone of the Enders: The 2nd Runner (2003)	various merchandise

=== Not including film and/or television works ===
Franchise (creator)	Literature	Comics	Video games	Other media
Alan Wake (Remedy Entertainment, Microsoft Studios)	yes	no	**Alan Wake** (2010); Alan Wake's American Nightmare (2012) expansion pack Alan Wake 2 (2023)	soundtrack and other merchandise
Banjo-Kazooie (Rare)	no	yes	**Banjo-Kazooie** (1998) numerous sequels and spin-offs	action figures, toys, and other merchandise
Battlefield (DICE, Electronic Arts)	Battlefield 3: The Russian (2011); Battlefield 4: Countdown to War (2013)	no	**Battlefield 1942** (2002) several other sequels spin-offs and sub-series	action figures and other merchandise
Bioshock (Ken Levine, Take Two Interactive)	yes	no	**Bioshock** (2007); Bioshock 2 (2010); BioShock Infinite (2013)	soundtrack, action figures, board games, clothes and other merchandise
Bloodborne (From Software)	no	various	**Bloodborne** (2015)	Card game, board game and other merchandise
Cooking Mama (Cooking Mama Limited)	no	no	**Cooking Mama** (2006); Several other sequels and spin-offs	
Contra (Konami)	no	yes	**Contra** (1985); Several other sequels and spin-offs	various merchandise
Crysis (Crytek, Electronic Arts)	Crysis Legion (2011); Crysis Escalation (2013)	yes	**Crysis** (2007); Crysis Warhead (2008) expansion pack Crysis 2 (2011); Crysis 3 (2013)	Board game, action figures and other merchandise
Darksiders (Vigil Games, Gunfire Games)	no	yes	**Darksiders** (2010); Darksiders II (2012); Darksiders III (2018); Darksiders Genesis (2019) Spin-off	Action figures and other merchandise
Dead Island (Techland)	yes	yes	**Dead Island** (2011); Dead Island Riptide (2013) expansion pack Escape Dead Island (2014) spin-off	various merchandise
Destiny (Bungie)	yes	yes	**Destiny** (2014) several expansion and one sequel	Artbooks, Guidebooks, Soundtracks, Cookbooks, and various other merchandise
Deus Ex (Square Enix)	Deus Ex: Icarus Effect (2011); Deus Ex: Fallen Angel (2013); Deus Ex: Black Light (2016); Deus Ex: Hard Line (2016)	Deus Ex: Human Revolution (2011); Deus Ex: Children's Crusade (2016); Deus Ex: The Dawning Darkness (2016)	**Deus Ex** (2000); Deus Ex: Invisible War (2003); Deus Ex: Human Revolution (2011); Deus Ex: Mankind Divided (2016)	Art Books, Guide Books and other merchandises
Diablo	various	various	**Diablo** (1996); Diablo II (2000); Diablo III (2012)	
Dishonored (Arkane Studios, Bethesda Softworks)	various	no	**Dishonored** (2012); Dishonored 2 (2016); Dishonored: Death of the Outsider (2017) expansion pack	Tabletop role-playing game and other merchandise
Duke Nukem (3D Realms)	no	Duke Nukem: Glorious Bastard (2011)	**Duke Nukem** (1991) several other sequels and spin-offs	Action figures, toys and other merchandise
The Elder Scrolls (Bethesda Game Studio)	The Infernal City (2009); Lord of Souls (2011) and several others	no	**The Elder Scrolls: Arena** (1994) and numerous other sequels, spin-offs and expansions	board games, tabletop role-playing games and several other merchandise
Hollow Knight (Team Cherry)	no	Hollow Knight First Chapter: Quirrel (2017)	**Hollow Knight** (2017); Hollow Knight: Silksong (2025)	various merchandise
The Evil Within (Bethesda)	yes	yes	**The Evil Within** (2014); The Evil Within 2 (2017)	various merchandise
Fable (Microsoft Studios)	Fable: The Balverine Order (2010) several others	no	**Fable** (2004) several sequels and spin-offs	Music, soundtrack and other merchandise
Fortnite (Epic Games)	no	yes	**Fortnite** (2017) several games	soundtrack, guidebooks, board games, merchandise line
Gears of War	Gears of War: Aspho Fields (2008) several sequels	Gears of War (comics)	**Gears of War** (2006); Gears of War 2 (2008); Gears of War 3 (2011); Gears of War: Judgment (2013)	board game
Guild Wars (ArenaNet, NCSoft)	various	no	**Guild Wars** (2005); Several expansion packs and one sequel	Artbooks, Guidebooks, soundtracks and numerous other merchandise
Horizon Zero Dawn (PlayStation Studios)	no	various	**Horizon Zero Dawn** (2017); Horizon Forbidden West (2022)	Action figures, soundtrack and other merchandise
Ico (PlayStation Studios)	yes	no	**Ico** (2001); Shadow of the Colossus (2005); The Last Guardian (2016)	Soundtrack, Artbook, Guidebook and various merchandise
Infamous (PlayStation Studios)	no	yes	**Infamous** (2009); Infamous 2 (2011); Infamous: Festival of Blood (2011) expansion pack Infamous Second Son (2014); Infamous First Light (2014) expansion pack	various merchandise
Just Cause (Square Enix)	no	yes	**Just Cause** (2006); Just Cause 2 (2010); Just Cause 3 (2015); Just Cause 4 (2018)	various merchandise
Killzone (PlayStation Studios)	yes	yes	**Killzone (**2004); Killzone: Liberation (2006) spin-off Killzone 2 (2009); Killzone 3 (2011); Killzone: Mercenary (2013) spin-off Killzone Shadow Fall (2013)	various merchandise
Left 4 Dead (Valve)	no	The Sacrifice (2010)	**Left 4 Dead** (2008); Left 4 Dead 2 (2009)	songs, figure action, music and other merchandise
Legacy of Kain (Square Enix Europe)	no	yes	**Blood Omen: Legacy of Kain** (1996) several other sequels and spin offs	Merchandise
Life Is Strange (Square Enix)	yes	yes	**Life Is Strange** (2015) other sequels and sin-offs	merchandise
Metal Gear (Hideo Kojima)	yes	several	**Metal Gear** (1987) numerous sequels and spin-offs	other media
Metroid (Nintendo)	no	various	**Metroid** (1986) numerous sequels	Soundtracks and other merchandise
Myst (Cyan Worlds)	Myst: The Book of Atrus (1995); Myst: The Book of Ti'ana (1996); Myst: The Book of D'ni (1997)	Myst: The Book of Black Ships (1997)	**Myst** (1993); Riven (1997); Myst III: Exile (2001); Uru: Ages Beyond Myst (2003) spin-off Uru: To D'ni (2004) expansion pack Uru: The Path of the Shell (2004) expansion pack Myst IV: Revelation (2004); Myst V: End of Ages (2005); Myst Online: Uru Live (2007) spin-off	Soundtracks, Guidebooks and other merchandise
Portal (Valve)	no	Portal 2: Lab Rat (2011)	**Portal** (2007); Portal 2 (2011)	Board game, T-shirt, collectibles and other merchandise
Quake (Id Software)	no	yes	**Quake** (1998) several other sequels and spin-offs	Guide books and other merchandise
The Oregon Trail (Don Rawitsch; Bill Heinemann; Paul Dillenberger)	yes	no	**The Oregon Trail** (1971) numerous sequels, editions and spin offs	Board Game; Card Game; Handheld device
Shantae (WayForward)	no	yes	**Shantae** (2002) several sequels	merchandise line
Sly Cooper (Sucker Punch Productions)	Sly Cooper: To Catch a Thief (2006)	The Adventures of Sly Cooper (2004-2005); Manga (2005)	**Sly Cooper and the Thievius Raccoonus** (2002); Sly 2: Band of Thieves (2004); Sly 3: Honor Among Thieves (2005); Sly Cooper: Thieves in Time (2013)	various merchandise
Soulcalibur (Bandai Namco Entertainment)	yes	yes	**Soul Edge** (1995) numerous sequels and spin-off	Action figure, collectible cards, and various other merchandise
Splatoon (Nintendo)	no	various	**Splatoon** (2015); Splatoon 2 (2017); Splatoon 2: Octo Expansion (2018); Splatoon 3 (2022); Splatoon 3: Side Order (2024); Splatoon Raiders (2026)	Amiibo Figures, Music and other merchandise
StarCraft	yes	yes	**StarCraft** (1998 and later expansions); StarCraft II (2010 and later expansions)	tabletop games
Suikoden (Konami)	yes	yes	**Suikoden** (1995) several other sequels and spin-off	guide books and various merchandise
Thief (Square Enix Europe)	no	yes	**Thief: The Dark Project** (1998); Thief II: The Metal Age (2000); Thief: Deadly Shadows (2004); Thief (2014)	merchandise
Watch Dogs (Ubisoft)	yes	yes	**Watch Dogs** (2014); Watch Dogs 2 (2016); Watch Dogs: Legion (2020)	merchandise
Wolfenstein (Id Software)	no	yes	**Wolfenstein 3D** (1992) numerous sequels spin-offs and reboots	guide books and other merchandise
Zork (Infocom)	yes	no	**Zork** (1977) numerous sequels	interactive gamebooks

== Franchises originating in board games, card games, tabletop games and role-playing games ==
Franchise (creator)	Literature	Comics	Animated films	Live action films	Animated TV	Live action TV	Video games	Other media
BattleTech (Jordan Weisman, L. Ross Babcock III)	List of BattleTech novels	yes	no	no	BattleTech: The Animated Series (1994)	no	yes	**Classic BattleTech** wargame several other table-top games
Car Wars (Steve Jackson Games)	3 novels	yes	no	no	no	no	Autoduel	**Car Wars** table-top game other table-top games
Cluedo (Anthony E. Pratt)	Clue book series (1992-1997)	various	no	Clue (1985); Cluedo: Movies, Murders, and Mysteries (1986); Untitled Cluedo film (TBA)	Clue (TBA)	Cluedo (1990-1993); Cluedo (1992-1993); Clue (2011)	various	**Cluedo** board game (1949-) and spin-offs; theatre
Cyberpunk (Mike Pondsmith)	List of Cyberpunk novels	Cyberpunk 2077: Trauma Team (2020)	no	no	Cyberpunk: Edgerunners	no	Cyberpunk 2077 (2020)	**Cyberpunk tabletop role-playing game** (1988), Netrunner, Cyberpunk the CCG, CyberGeneration, The Arasaka Brainworm, Greenwar various other role-playing and board games
Dungeons & Dragons (Gary Gygax)	Dungeons & Dragons novels	Dungeons & Dragons (comics)	Dragonlance: Dragons of Autumn Twilight (2008)	Dungeons & Dragons (2000) two sequels Dungeons & Dragons: Honor Among Thieves (2023)	Dungeons & Dragons (1983–1985)	no	List of Dungeons & Dragons video games	**Dungeons & Dragons** role-playing game board games
Glorantha (Greg Stafford)	yes	yes	no	no	no	no	King of Dragon Pass	**White Bear and Red Moon**; RuneQuest; HeroQuest
Magic: The Gathering (Richard Garfield)	several	several	no	no	no	no	several	**Magic: The Gathering trading card game**
Mutant Chronicles (Target Games)	3 novels	yes	no	Mutant Chronicles (2008)	no	no	Doom Troopers (1995)	**Mutant Chronicles** role-playing game several table-top games
Shadowrun (FASA Corporation)	several	no	no	no	no	no	several	**Shadowrun** role-playing game several table-top games
Warhammer (Games Workshop)	List of Warhammer Fantasy novels List of Warhammer 40,000 novels	Warhammer Fantasy comics Warhammer 40,000 comics	Ultramarines: A Warhammer 40,000 Movie (2010)	no	no	no	Warhammer video games	**Warhammer Fantasy Battle** miniature wargame several other table-top games
World of Darkness (White Wolf Publishing)	several	yes	no	no	no	Kindred: The Embraced (1996)	yes	**Vampire: The Masquerade** role-playing game several other table-top games

== Franchises originating in songs, albums, and theatre ==
Franchise (creator)	Literature	Comics	Animated films	Live action films	Animated TV	Live action TV	Video games	Toys, attractions and other media
Alvin and the Chipmunks (Ross Bagdasarian)	no	yes	The Chipmunk Adventure (1987); Alvin and the Chipmunks Meet Frankenstein (1999); Alvin and the Chipmunks Meet the Wolfman (2000) several TV specials	Little Alvin and the Mini-Munks (2004); Alvin and the Chipmunks (2007); Alvin and the Chipmunks: The Squeakquel (2009); Alvin and the Chipmunks: Chipwrecked (2011); Alvin and the Chipmunks: The Road Chip (2015)	The Alvin Show (1961–1962); Alvin and the Chipmunks (1983–1990); ALVINNN!!! and the Chipmunks (2010)	no	yes	"**The Chipmunk Song (Christmas Don't Be Late)**" (1958); Alvin and the Chipmunks discography live stage show
The Amory Wars (Claudio Sanchez)	Year of the Black Rainbow (2010)	several	no	upcoming	no	no	yes	**Albums** by Coheed and Cambria
BanG Dream! (Bushiroad)	BanG_Dream! Star Beat (2016)	several	BanG Dream! Film Live (2019); BanG Dream! Episode of Roselia (2021)	no	BanG Dream! (2017–2020); BanG Dream! Girls Band Party! Pico (2018–2020)	no	BanG Dream! Girls Band Party! (2017)	**Live Concerts, Albums** and various merchandise
Captain Sabertooth (Terje Formoe)	numerous	several	yes	The Dream of Captain Sabertooth's Kingdom and several others	no	yes	several	**Captain Sabertooth** Stage plays
Crazy Frog (Erik Wernquist)	yes	no	no	no	no	no	Crazy Frog Racer (2005); Crazy Frog Racer 2 (2006)	**Crazy Frog discography** (beginning in 2005) additional merchandise
Frosty the Snowman (Walter "Jack" Rollins and Steve Nelson)	Frosty the Snow Man (1950)	several	Frosty the Snowman (1969); Frosty's Winter Wonderland (1976); Rudolph and Frosty's Christmas in July (1979); Frosty Returns (1992); The Legend of Frosty the Snowman (2005)	Frosty the Snowman (TBA)	no	no	no	**Frosty the Snowman (song)** (1950)
The Hitchhiker's Guide to the Galaxy (Douglas Adams)	5 original novels (1979–1992); And Another Thing... (2006)	yes	no	The Hitchhiker's Guide to the Galaxy (2005)	no	The Hitchhiker's Guide to the Galaxy (1981)	several	**The Hitchhiker's Guide to the Galaxy** radio series (1978–1980) stage play
Lone Ranger (George W. Trendle or Fran Striker)	The Lone Ranger (1936), and numerous others	various|	no	The Lone Ranger (1938 film serial);	The Lone Ranger (1966–1968)	The Lone Ranger (1949–1957); numerous others	The Lone Ranger (1991)	**The Lone Ranger** (1933 radio show)
Madea (Tyler Perry)	Don't Make a Black Woman Take Off Her Earrings (2006)	no	Madea's Tough Love (2015)	numerous	no	House of Payne	no	**I Can Do Bad All by Myself** (1999); Numerous other stage plays
The Odd Couple (Neil Simon)	no	no	no	The Odd Couple (1968); The Odd Couple II (1998)	The Oddball Couple (1975–1977)	The Odd Couple (1970–1975); The New Odd Couple (1982–1983); The Odd Couple (2015)	no	**The Odd Couple** (1965 stage play)
The Wiggles (The Wiggles Pty Ltd)	yes	yes	Yes	Magical Adventure A Wiggly Movie (2003)	yes	The Wiggles Show(1998-2022)	yes	The Wiggles (album) (1991)Numerous Other Stage Plays

== Franchises originating in toys, attractions and other media ==
Franchise (creator)	Literature	Comics	Animated films	Live action films	Animated TV	Live action TV	Video games	Toys, attractions and other media
American Girl (Pleasant Rowland)	numerous	no	no	several	no	no	several	**American Girl** dolls
Barbie (Ruth Handler)	numerous	yes	numerous direct to video	Barbie (2023)	Barbie: Life in the Dreamhouse (2012–present)	no	several	**Barbie** fashion dolls
Bratz (Carter Bryant)	several	no	several direct to video	Bratz: The Movie (2007)	Bratz (2005–2006)	Bratz Design Academy (2008)	several	**Bratz** fashion dolls
Care Bears (Elena Kucharik and Linda Denham)	numerous children's books	several	The Care Bears Movie (1985) numerous others	Care Bears (TBA)	Care Bears (1986–1988) several others	no	numerous	**Care Bears greeting cards** (1981) plush dolls soundtracks
Digimon (Bandai)	Digimon Adventure Light Novel (2001)	several	9	no	6	no	several	**Virtual pet** Card game
G.I. Joe (Hasbro)	no	G.I. Joe (comics)	G.I. Joe: The Movie (1987); G.I. Joe: Spy Troops (2003); G.I. Joe: Valor vs. Venom (2004); G.I. Joe: Ninja Battles (2004)	G.I. Joe: The Rise of Cobra (2009); G.I. Joe: Retaliation (2013); Snake Eyes (2021)	Various productions, beginning with G.I. Joe: A Real American Hero (1983–1987)	no	List of G.I. Joe video games	List of **G.I. Joe** action figure series
Hello Kitty (Yuko Shimizu )	yes	yes	yes	The Hello Kitty Movie (2028)	Hello Kitty's Furry Tale Theater (1987) Hello Kitty and Friends (1989-1998) Hello Kitty's Paradise (1999) The Adventures of Hello Kitty & Friends (2008-2009) Hello Kitty: Super Style! (2022-2024)	yes	Hello Kitty's Cube Frenzy (1998) Hello Kitty: Roller Rescue (2005) Hello Kitty Online (2008) Hello Kitty: Big City Dreams (2008) Hello Kitty and the Apron of Magic (2013) Hello Kitty Island Adventure (2023)	Hello Kitty (song) (2014)
Lego (The Lego Group)	several	no	The Lego Movie franchise; direct-to-video films Piece by Piece (2024)	Various untitled live-action Lego films (TBA)	no	no	several	**Lego** building blocks; Legoland theme park
Labubu ( Pop Mart)	yes	yes	yes	Labubu (TBA)	yes	yes	yes	Labubu (2015)
Lone Ranger (George W. Trendle or Fran Striker)	The Lone Ranger (1936), and numerous others	various|	no	The Lone Ranger (1938 film serial);	The Lone Ranger (1966–1968)	The Lone Ranger (1949–1957); numerous others	The Lone Ranger (1991)	**The Lone Ranger** (1933 radio show)
Masters of the Universe (Mattel)	Masters of the Universe (Book series)	He-Man and the Masters of the Universe (1982)	The Secret of the Sword (1985)	Masters of the Universe (1987) Masters of the Universe (2026)	He-Man and the Masters of the Universe (1983-1984) He-Man & She-Ra: A Christmas Special (1985) She-Ra: Princess of Power (1985-1987) The New Adventures of He-Man (1990) He-Man and the Masters of the Universe (2002-2004) She-Ra and the Princesses of Power (2018-2020) Masters of the Universe: Revelation (2021-2024) He-Man and the Masters of the Universe (2021-2022)	yes	Masters of the Universe: The Power of He-Man (1983) Masters of the Universe: The Super Adventure (1986) Masters of the Universe: The Movie (1987) Masters of the Universe: The Arcade Game (1987) He-Man: Power of Grayskull (2002) He-Man: Defender of Grayskull (2005) He-Man: The Most Powerful Game in the Universe (2012) He-Man Tapper of Grayskull (2015)	Masters of the Universe (1982) Princess of Power (1984)
My Little Pony (Hasbro)	yes	yes	My Little Pony: The Movie (1986); Various direct-to-video films produced in 2000s My Little Pony: Equestria Girls (2013) and two sequels My Little Pony: The Movie (2017)	My Little Pony (TBA)	My Little Pony (1984 TV special); My Little Pony: Escape from Catrina (1985 TV special); My Little Pony (1986, part of My Little Pony 'n Friends anthology series); My Little Pony Tales (1992); My Little Pony: Friendship Is Magic (2010)	no	yes	**My Little Pony** (toy line)
Pirates of the Caribbean (The Walt Disney Company)	Pirates of the Caribbean: Jack Sparrow (12 books); Pirates of the Caribbean: Legends of the Brethren Court (5 books); Pirates of the Caribbean: The Price of Freedom	no	no	Pirates of the Caribbean (film series) (2003–2017)	no	no	List of Pirates of the Caribbean video games	**Disney theme park ride**, beginning in 1967
Strawberry Shortcake (Muriel Fahrion)	yes	yes	several	no	several	no	List of Strawberry Shortcake video games	**Strawberry Shortcake** greeting cards various merchandise
Transformers (Hasbro, based on two existing toy lines created by Takara)	List of Transformers books	Transformers (comics)	The Transformers: The Movie (1986); Transformers One (2024)	Transformers (film series) (2007–present)	The Transformers (1982–1987); various series	no	List of Transformers video games	**Transformers** (toy line)
Trolls (Thomas Dam)	?	no	Trolls (2016); Trolls World Tour (2020); Trolls Band Together (2023)	no	Trollz (2005); Trolls Holiday (2017); Trolls: Holiday in Harmony (2021); Trolls: The Beat Goes On! (2018–2019); Trolls: TrollsTopia (2020–2022)	no	yes	**Troll dolls** (c. 1956); Trolls movie soundtrack albums

== See also ==
- List of fictional shared universes in film and television – many multimedia franchises are based in fictional universes
- List of public domain works with multimedia adaptations
- List of highest-grossing media franchises
- Media mix
