= Drømmen om kaptein Sabeltanns rike =

- Directed by: Terje Formoe
- Written by: Terje Formoe; Jan-Robert Jore; Cecilia Solberg
- Starring: Fredrik H. Træland (Joachim); Sverre Haagensen (Ruben); Terje Formoe (Sabertooth); Roger André Federici (Marco); Janne Formoe (Sunniva); Svein Haagensen (Maga Kahn)
- Release date: 1996
- Running time: 67 minutes
- Country: Norway
- Language: Norwegian

Drømmen om kaptein Sabeltanns rike (English: The Dream of Captain Sabertooth's Kingdom) is a 1996 Norwegian children's film written and directed by, and starring Terje Formoe. The film is based on the popular children's play character Captain Sabertooth, a fictional pirate.

== Production ==
The film was the third Sabertooth film, and was shot in and around Kristiansand. Going straight to video, Terje Formoe stated that the film would break even at 40,000 sold copies. One week after release, it had sold 75,000 copies. The film was then aired in three parts by NRK 1 in January 1997.

== Plot ==
The film is about Joachim, a boy who is a huge fan of Terje Formoe's pirate character Captain Sabertooth. Joachim's parents are not so excited about Joachim's interest in Captain Sabertooth. One day Joachim falls asleep in the boat he is out on a trip with, and dreams that he meets the sailor Ruben the Red. Ruben is convinced that Pinky and Sunniva have been kidnapped by Captain Sabeltann's men, and is being held captive in his castle on the volcanic island of Abra, also called the Invisible Land, where Captain Sabeltann's kingdom is. Aunt Bassa has asked Ruben to leave to free Pinky and Sunniva, but Ruben's rudder has been destroyed on the journey, but fortunately Joachim can help. At the same time, a young boy named Marco is fleeing through the jungle on the South Sea island of Shangri-La. He is Pinky's little brother and has stolen a magic diamond from the evil jungle prince Maga Kahn, a diamond that even Captain Sabertooth himself wants to claw at, so he can once and for all get hold of Cruel Gabriel's treasure and gold anchors in Kjuttaviga.
