= Captain Sabertooth and the Magic Diamond =

2018 Norwegian stop motion film

- Norwegian theatrical release poster
- Norwegian: Kaptein Sabeltann og den magiske diamant
- Directed by: Rasmus A. Sivertsen; Marit Moum Aune
- Screenplay by: Karsten Fullu
- Produced by: Ove Heiborg; Heidi Palm Sandberg; Eirik Smidesang Slåen
- Production companies: Qvisten Animation; Kaptein Sabeltann AS; Kristiansand Zoo and Amusement Park; Forlagshuset Vigmostad & Bjørke; Lumière Invest
- Distributed by: Nordic Film Distribution
- Release date: 27 September 2019
- Running time: 81 minutes
- Countries: Norway; Belgium
- Language: Norwegian
- Budget: 3.540 million NOK
- Box office: $2.777 million

Captain Sabertooth and the Magic Diamond (Norwegian: Kaptein Sabeltann og den magiske diamant) is a 2019 computer-animated swashbuckler musical comedy film directed by Rasmus A. Sivertsen and Marit Moum Aune (in his directorial debut) from a screenplay by Karsten Fullu. Based on the Captain Sabertooth media franchise, the film's script is based on a 1996 Sabertooth play by Terje Formoe. It is produced by Qvisten Animation, and was released in Norway on 27 September 2019.

== Voice cast ==
- Kyrre Haugen Sydness as Captain Sabertooth
- Tobias Santelmann as Langemann
- Trond Fausa Aurvåg as Benjamin
- Bartek Kaminski as Maga Kahn
  - Åge Sten Nilsen provides his singing voice
- Charlotte Frogner as Sirikit, Maga Khan's Queen
- Laila Goody as Aunt Bassa
- Jan Martin Johnsen as Tully
- Siri Skjeggedal as Sunniva
- Leonard Valestrand Eike as Pinky
- Ida Valestrand Eike as Marco
- Jon Øigarden as Baltazar
- Kristin Grue as Parrot

== Release ==
Captain Sabertooth and the Magic Diamond was released in Norway on 27 September 2019 by Nordic Film Distribution, and grossed $915,225 in its opening week for a total gross of $2,414,475 by the end of its theatrical run. It was released in other cinemas worldwide which contributed to a total gross of $2,777,947.
