= Marit Moum Aune =

Norwegian stage director

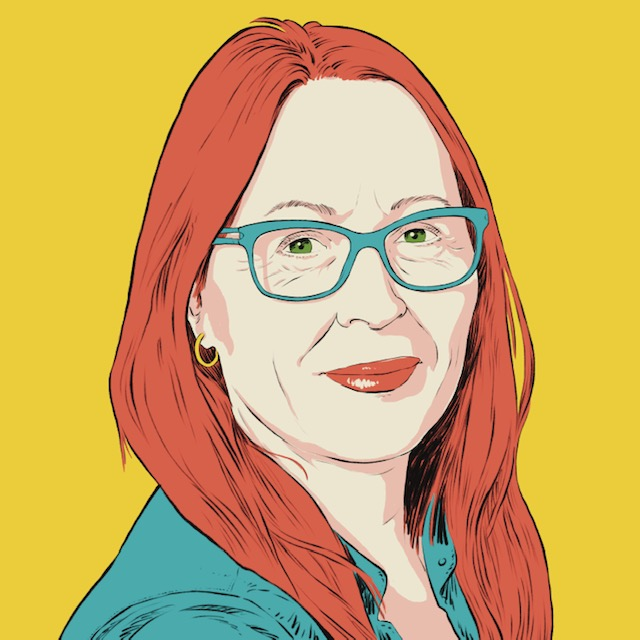
- Born: 15 May 1964 (age 61); Trondheim, Norway
- Occupation: Stage director
- Awards: Hedda Award (2001); Amanda Award (2020)

Marit Moum Aune (born 15 May 1964) is a Norwegian stage director. She has contributed to classical and contemporary theatre, musical theatre and ballet, animation film for children, and screen drama series. She received a Hedda Award in 2001, and an Amanda Award in 2020. She has been appointed theatre director for Nationaltheatret from 2027.

== Life and career ==
Aune was born in Trondheim on 15 May 1964.

In the late 1980s she was director of the project stage Teaterhuset Avant Garden. From the 1990s she directed musical theatre, including Kristin Lavransdatter at the Nidaros Cathedral, Iren Reppen’s Det e hardt å være mainn, Jeg er stygg at Rogaland Teater, and Bør Børson Jr. at Det Norske Teatret.

Her staging of Genanse og verdighet at Nationaltheatret earned her a Hedda Award in 2001.

She has directed classical plays by Brecht and Ibsen, as well as theatre adaptations of novels by contemporary writers, including Linn Ullmann, Olaug Nilssen, Vigdis Hjorth, and Agnes Ravatn. In the 2005/2006 season she was responsible for Pippi Langstrømpe at Nationaltheatret, a performance for children based on books by Astrid Lindgren. In 2012 she directed an adaptation of Ingmar Bergman's Scenes from a Marriage at Oslo Nye Teater. In 2015 she directed the premiere of the musical Halve kongeriket by Are Kalvø and Ingrid Bjørnov, staged at Det Norske Teatret. She directed an adaptation of Tony Kushner's play Angels in America for Nationaltheatret in 2018.

She directed a ballet adaptation of Ghosts at the Norwegian National Opera and Ballet in 2014, and similarly Hedda Gabler in 2017 and The Wild Duck in 2024. She was assigned as house director for the National Ballet from 2019.

In 2019 she co-directed the animation film Captain Sabertooth and the Magic Diamond (Norwegian: Kaptein Sabeltann og den magiske diamant) together with Rasmus A. Sivertsen. The film won the Amanda Award Folkets Amanda in 2020.

In 2022 she directed the drama series Made in Oslo for Viaplay, and the series Milliardærøya for Netflix in 2024.

In 2025 she was appointed the next theatre director for Nationaltheatret, succeeding Kristian Seltun from 2027.
