= List of Tekken media =

Tekken is a fighting video game series developed by Namco and published by Namco Bandai. The series debuted in 1994 with the arcade version of Tekken and is one of the genre's and Namco's best-selling franchises, with over 55 million units sold, and is the 44th best-selling franchise of all time as of 2023.

The games take place in a fictional universe and follow an ongoing story that involves an annual martial arts tournament called The King of Iron Fist Tournament, organized by Mishima Zaibatsu conglomerate owner Heihachi Mishima, in which contestants fight for control of the corporation and prize money. Tekken titles are usually released originally in arcades, before being released on video game consoles a year later; the series was largely exclusive to the PlayStation series of consoles, and the arcade machines run on PlayStation-based hardware. Tekken 6 was the first title to release on a non-Sony console; Tekken 8 was the first to debut on home consoles, not arcades.

Related comics, dramatizations and music albums have also been released, and some of the series' recurring characters have also appeared in other Namco games.

== Video games ==
=== Main series ===
Game	Details
Tekken Original release date(s): JP: September 21, 1994; NA: March 31, 1995; EU: November 1995	Release years by system: 1994—Arcade; 1995—PlayStation
Tekken Original release date(s): JP: September 21, 1994; NA: March 31, 1995; EU: November 1995	Notes: Worldwide sales: 1.7 million+; Originally released as an arcade game on Namco's PlayStation-based System 11 board in 1994; First PlayStation game to sell over one million units
Tekken 2 Original release date(s): JP: June 21, 1995; NA: August 25, 1996; EU: October 1996	Release years by system: 1995—Arcade; 1996—PlayStation; 2006—PlayStation 3 (NA only), PlayStation Portable (NA only); 2009—Zeebo (BR only)
Tekken 2 Original release date(s): JP: June 21, 1995; NA: August 25, 1996; EU: October 1996	Notes: Worldwide sales: 5.7 million; Originally released as an arcade game on Namco's System 11 board in 1995
Tekken 3 Original release date(s): JP: March 20, 1997; NA: April 29, 1998; EU: September 1998	Release years by system: 1997—Arcade; 1998—PlayStation
Tekken 3 Original release date(s): JP: March 20, 1997; NA: April 29, 1998; EU: September 1998	Notes: Worldwide sales: 8.36 million; Highest rated entry in the entire franchise; Second best selling fighting game of all time after Super Smash Bros. Brawl; Originally released as an arcade game on Namco's PlayStation-based System 12 board in 1997
Tekken 4 Original release date(s): JP: August 2001; NA: September 13, 2002; EU: September 23, 2002	Release years by system: 2001—Arcade; 2002—PlayStation 2
Tekken 4 Original release date(s): JP: August 2001; NA: September 13, 2002; EU: September 23, 2002	Notes: Worldwide sales: 1.979 million; Originally released as an arcade game on Namco's PlayStation 2-based System 246 board in 2001
Tekken 5 Original release date(s): JP: November 2004; NA: February 24, 2005; EU: May 1, 2005; AU: June 24, 2005	Release years by system: 2004—Arcade; 2005—PlayStation 2
Tekken 5 Original release date(s): JP: November 2004; NA: February 24, 2005; EU: May 1, 2005; AU: June 24, 2005	Notes: Worldwide sales: 6 million; Originally released as an arcade game on Namco's PlayStation 2-based System 256 board in 2004; Received an update in arcades known as Tekken 5: Dark Resurrection
Tekken 5: Dark Resurrection Original release date(s): JP: December 2005; NA: July 25, 2006; EU: September 15, 2006; AU: September 16, 2006; JP: August 1, 2007 (ONLINE); NA: August 30, 2007 (ONLINE)	Release years by system: 2005—PlayStation Portable; 2006—PlayStation 3 (JP); 2007—PlayStation 3 (PlayStation Network)(NA, EU, AU)
Tekken 5: Dark Resurrection Original release date(s): JP: December 2005; NA: July 25, 2006; EU: September 15, 2006; AU: September 16, 2006; JP: August 1, 2007 (ONLINE); NA: August 30, 2007 (ONLINE)	Notes: Worldwide sales: 2.6 million; Originally released as an arcade game on Namco's System 256 board in Japan in 2005 and in North America in 2006; Released as Tekken: Dark Resurrection on the PlayStation Portable; PlayStation 3 version updated with an online component and retitled Tekken 5: Dark Resurrection ONLINE
Tekken 6 Original release date(s): WW: November 26, 2007; NA: October 27, 2009; JP: October 29, 2009; EU: October 30, 2009; AU: November 5, 2009	Release years by system: 2007—Arcade; 2009—PlayStation 3, Xbox 360, PlayStation Portable (NA, EU, AU); 2010—PlayStation Portable (JP)
Tekken 6 Original release date(s): WW: November 26, 2007; NA: October 27, 2009; JP: October 29, 2009; EU: October 30, 2009; AU: November 5, 2009	Notes: Worldwide sales: 3.5 million; Originally released as an arcade game on Bandai Namco's PlayStation 3-based System 357 board in 2007; First Tekken installment released as a multiplatform game; Received an update in arcades titled Tekken 6: Bloodline Rebellion on December 18, 2008
Tekken 7 Original release date(s): JP: March 18, 2015; WW: June 2, 2017	Release years by system: 2015—Arcade; 2017—PlayStation 4, Xbox One, Microsoft Windows
Tekken 7 Original release date(s): JP: March 18, 2015; WW: June 2, 2017	Notes: Worldwide sales: 10 million; Running on Unreal Engine 4; Originally released as an arcade game on Bandai Namco's PC-based arcade board in 2015
Tekken 8 Original release date(s): WW: January 26, 2024	Release years by system: PlayStation 5, Xbox Series X and Series S, Microsoft Windows
Tekken 8 Original release date(s): WW: January 26, 2024	Notes: Newest entry in the Tekken series; Announced on September 13, 2022; Running on Unreal Engine 5

=== Spin-offs ===
Game	Details
Tekken Card Challenge Original release date(s): JP: June 17, 1999	Release years by system: WonderSwan
Tekken Card Challenge Original release date(s): JP: June 17, 1999	Notes: Released in Japan only
Tekken Tag Tournament Original release date(s): JP: July 1, 1999; NA: October 25, 2000; EU: November 24, 2000	Release years by system: 1999—Arcade; 2000—PlayStation 2; 2011—PlayStation 3 HD
Tekken Tag Tournament Original release date(s): JP: July 1, 1999; NA: October 25, 2000; EU: November 24, 2000	Notes: Worldwide sales: 2.367 million; Launch title for PlayStation 2; Originally released as an arcade game on Namco's System 12 board in 1999; Remastered on PlayStation 3 and rereleased as part of Tekken Hybrid in 2011
Tekken Advance Original release date(s): JP: December 21, 2001; NA: January 28, 2002; EU: March 29, 2002	Release years by system: Game Boy Advance
Tekken Advance Original release date(s): JP: December 21, 2001; NA: January 28, 2002; EU: March 29, 2002	Notes: Features 10 characters from Tekken 3
Death by Degrees Original release date(s): JP: January 27, 2005; NA: February 8, 2005; EU: April 15, 2005	Release years by system: PlayStation 2
Death by Degrees Original release date(s): JP: January 27, 2005; NA: February 8, 2005; EU: April 15, 2005	Notes: An action adventure game starring Nina Williams
Tekken Tag Tournament 2 Original release date(s): WW: September 14, 2011; NA: September 11, 2012; JP: September 13, 2012; AU: September 13, 2012; EU: September 14, 2012	Release years by system: 2011—Arcade; 2012—PlayStation 3, Xbox 360, Wii U
Tekken Tag Tournament 2 Original release date(s): WW: September 14, 2011; NA: September 11, 2012; JP: September 13, 2012; AU: September 13, 2012; EU: September 14, 2012	Notes: Worldwide sales: 1.5 million; Originally released as an arcade game on Bandai Namco's PlayStation 3-based System 369 board in 2011; Demo included with Tekken Hybrid on PlayStation 3 titled Tekken Tag Tournament 2: Prologue in 2011; Received an update in arcades titled Tekken Tag Tournament 2 Unlimited in 2012
Tekken 3D: Prime Edition Original release date(s): JP: February 16, 2012; NA: February 14, 2012; EU: February 17, 2012	Release years by system: Nintendo 3DS
Tekken 3D: Prime Edition Original release date(s): JP: February 16, 2012; NA: February 14, 2012; EU: February 17, 2012	Notes: Features all characters from Tekken 6
Tekken Revolution Original release date(s): JP: June 12, 2013; NA: June 11, 2013; EU: June 12, 2013	Release years by system: PlayStation 3
Tekken Revolution Original release date(s): JP: June 12, 2013; NA: June 11, 2013; EU: June 12, 2013	Notes: Free to play title; Downloaded over 2 million times on PlayStation 3 via the PlayStation Store; First new Tekken game to be exclusive to PlayStation since Tekken 5: Dark Resurrection and second Tekken product to be PlayStation exclusive after Tekken Hybrid overall

=== Remasters ===
Game	Details
Tekken Hybrid Original release date(s): JP: December 1, 2011; NA: November 22, 2011; EU: November 25, 2011	Release years by system: PlayStation 3
Tekken Hybrid Original release date(s): JP: December 1, 2011; NA: November 22, 2011; EU: November 25, 2011	Notes: Blu-ray disc consisting of HD version of Tekken Tag Tournament, prologue version of Tekken Tag Tournament 2 and the movie, Tekken: Blood Vengeance.; First Tekken product to be exclusive to PlayStation since Tekken 5: Dark Resurrection

=== Crossovers ===
Game	Details
Namco X Capcom Original release date(s): JP: May 26, 2005	Release years by system: 2005—PlayStation 2
Namco X Capcom Original release date(s): JP: May 26, 2005	Notes: Namco and Capcom's first crossover title, featuring eight characters from Tekken; Released in Japan only
Street Fighter X Tekken Original release date(s): NA: March 6, 2012; EU: March 9, 2012; JP: March 8, 2012	Release years by system: PlayStation 3, Xbox 360, Windows, PlayStation Vita
Street Fighter X Tekken Original release date(s): NA: March 6, 2012; EU: March 9, 2012; JP: March 8, 2012	Notes: A crossover fighting game being developed by Capcom, featuring characters from both Tekken and Street Fighter. Played in a similar fighting engine to Street Fighter.
Tekken X Street Fighter Original release date(s): Unreleased	Release years by system: Unreleased
Tekken X Street Fighter Original release date(s): Unreleased	Notes: A crossover fighting game being developed by Namco, to be played in the style of the Tekken series.

== Other media ==
=== Manga ===
Game	Details
The Tekken Saga Original release date(s): 1997	Release years by system: 1997–Paperback
The Tekken Saga Original release date(s): 1997	Notes: One-shot comic about Tekken and Tekken 2

Game	Details
Tekken Forever Original release date(s): December 1, 2001	Release years by system: 2001–Paperback
Tekken Forever Original release date(s): December 1, 2001	Notes: Intended to reveal the origins of Unknown, but turned into a one shot unfinished comic.
Tekken Comic Original release date(s): 2010	Release years by system: Digital—2009
Tekken Comic Original release date(s): 2010	Notes: A Manga adaptation of Tekken 6

=== Dramatizations ===
Game	Details
Tekken: The Motion Picture Original release date(s): JP: January 21, 1998; NA: 1999; CAN: 1999	Release years by system: 1998—Film; 1998—VHS; 1999—DVD (NA); 2000—DVD (EU)
Tekken: The Motion Picture Original release date(s): JP: January 21, 1998; NA: 1999; CAN: 1999	Notes: An OVA adaptation of Tekken and Tekken 2
Tekken Original release date(s): JP: March 6, 2010; NA: July 19, 2011; EU: May 2, 2011	Release years by system: 2010—Film
Tekken Original release date(s): JP: March 6, 2010; NA: July 19, 2011; EU: May 2, 2011	Notes: Live-action film based on the Tekken series; Originally screened at the American Film Market in 2009
Tekken: Blood Vengeance Original release date(s): JP: September 3, 2011; NA: July 26, 2011; EU: November 21, 2011	Release years by system: 2011
Tekken: Blood Vengeance Original release date(s): JP: September 3, 2011; NA: July 26, 2011; EU: November 21, 2011	Notes: A 2011 Japanese 3D computer-animated film based on the Tekken series
Tekken 2: Kazuya's Revenge Original release date(s): JP: May 3, 2014; WW: August 6, 2014	Release years by system: 2014-Film
Tekken 2: Kazuya's Revenge Original release date(s): JP: May 3, 2014; WW: August 6, 2014	Notes: A sequel to Tekken.
Tekken: Bloodline Original release date(s): JP: August 18, 2022; WW: August 18, 2022	Release years by system: 2022-Netflix
Tekken: Bloodline Original release date(s): JP: August 18, 2022; WW: August 18, 2022	Notes: An ONA adaptation of Tekken 3 for Netflix.

=== Music albums ===
Title	Release date	Length	Label	Source
Tekken - Windermere: The Jungle Mixes	February 25, 1995	24:27	JVC (JVCD-0001-6)	
Namco Game Sound Express Vol. 17: Tekken	March 24, 1995	38:25	Victor (VICL-15039)	
Namco Game Sound Express Vol. 26: Tekken 2	November 22, 1995	33:54	Victor (VICL-15050)	
Tekken	April 10, 1996	1:04:05	JVC (JVC-9003-2)	
Tekken - Windermere: The Jungle Mixes (reissue)	April 21, 1996	24:27	JVC (JVCD-0002-1)	
Tekken 2: Strike Fighting Vol. 1	June 29, 1996	49:26	NEC Avenue (NACL-1225)	
Tekken 2: Strike Fighting Vol. 2	July 20, 1996	54:31	NEC Avenue (NACL-1225)	
Tekken 2: Strike Arranges	August 21, 1996	58:52	NEC Avenue (NACL-1238)	
Tekken UK. Remixes	September 28, 1996	1:03:29	Victor (VICL-23120)	
Tekken 3 Arcade Soundtrack 001EX	June 18, 1997	50:14	Wonder Spirits (WSCAX-10001)	
Tekken 3 PlayStation Soundtrack: Seven Remixes	August 19, 1997	35:03	Pony Canyon (PCCG-00455)	
Tekken 3: Battle Trax	August 20, 1997	51:25	Pony Canyon (PCCG-00416)	
Tekken: The Motion Picture Original Soundtrack	January 21, 1998	39:22	Sony (SRCL-4177)	
Tekken Drama CD	February 21, 1998	45:58	Sony (SRCL-4193)	
Tekken 3: Techno Maniax	March 18, 1998	45:59	Pony Canyon (PCCG-00441)	
Tekken 3 PlayStation Soundtrack 002	May 20, 1998	1:15:50	Wonder Spirits (WSCA-00016)	
Tekken Tag Tournament Original Soundtrack	September 21, 1999	43:42	Bandai (APCG-4046)	
Tekken Tag Tournament Direct Audio	June 7, 2000	1:12:28	Media Factory (ZMCX-1094)	
Tekken Tag Tournament Direct Audio (US printing)	December 12, 2000	1:12:15	Tokyopop Soundtrax (TPCD 0203–2)	
Tekken 4 Original Sound Tracks	May 22, 2002	1:31:25	Scitron (SCDC-00181~2)	
TEKKEN:NINA WILLIAMS DEATH BY DEGREES Original Soundtrack	April 27, 2005	1:18:50	NAMCO SOUND GEAR	
Tekken 5 & Tekken: Dark Resurrection Original Soundtrack	July 26, 2006	2:30:02	Victor (VICL-62048~9)	
Tekken 6 (Arcade)	November 25, 2009	36:58	Bandai Namco Games	
Tekken 6 Soundtrack	December 9, 2009	2:44:07	SuperSweep (SRIN-1068)	
Tekken Blood Vengeance Original Soundtrack	September 3, 2011	1:03:26	SuperSweep (CD); Namco Sounds (Digital)	
Tekken Tag Tournament 2 Original Soundtrack	November 17, 2011	1:24:59	SuperSweep	
Tekken Hybrid Limited Edition Soundtrack	November 19, 2011	1:17:00	Bandai Namco Games	
Street Fighter X Tekken Original Soundtrack	March 8, 2012	1:59:50	Capcom (CPDA-10070~1)	
Tekken Tag Tournament 2 Original Sound Track Plus	June 28, 2013	1:59:07	SuperSweep	
Tekken Revolution Soundtrack	March 30, 2016	1:36:36	SuperSweep	
Tekken 7 Soundtrack	May 21, 2016	1:23:41	SuperSweep	
Tekken 7 Soundtrack Plus	October 31, 2017	4:02:50	SuperSweep	
Tekken 8 Original Soundtrack	March 13, 2024	TBA	BANDAI NAMCO	
