= List of Uncharted media =

Franchise of video games and media

Uncharted is an adventure media franchise developed by Naughty Dog, composed of video games and associated media. The core of the franchise is an eponymous series of action-adventure third-person shooter games, which follow Nathan Drake, along with Victor Sullivan and Elena Fisher, as he journeys around the world searching for historical treasures and attempting to prevent villains from harnessing the supernatural powers of various relics. The video games have had high sales, with the series as a whole selling over 41 million units by the end of 2017.

In addition to the four games of the main series, published for the PlayStation 3 and PlayStation 4, the Uncharted video game series includes a browser game, two handheld games, and a mobile game, with varying gameplay styles. The franchise also contains a film, a novel, a behind-the-scenes book, two concept art books, a comic book, a board game, two motion comics, and seven soundtrack albums or singles. The first entry of the franchise, Uncharted: Drake's Fortune, was published in 2007, while the latest video game, Uncharted 4's expansion pack Uncharted: The Lost Legacy, was published in 2017, and the latest entry, the film Uncharted, was released in 2022.

== Video games ==
=== Main games ===
Main series
Game	Details
Uncharted: Drake's Fortune Original release dates: NA: November 19, 2007; JP: December 6, 2007; AU: December 6, 2007; EU: December 7, 2007	Release years by system: 2007 – PlayStation 3; 2015 – PlayStation 4
Uncharted: Drake's Fortune Original release dates: NA: November 19, 2007; JP: December 6, 2007; AU: December 6, 2007; EU: December 7, 2007	Notes: Developed by Naughty Dog; PlayStation 4 remaster developed by Bluepoint Games; Published by Sony Computer Entertainment; Included in Uncharted Dual Pack compilation; PlayStation 4 version released solely as part of the Uncharted: The Nathan Drake Collection compilation release
Uncharted 2: Among Thieves Original release dates: NA: October 13, 2009; JP: October 15, 2009; AU: October 15, 2009; EU: October 16, 2009	Release years by system: 2009 – PlayStation 3; 2015 – PlayStation 4
Uncharted 2: Among Thieves Original release dates: NA: October 13, 2009; JP: October 15, 2009; AU: October 15, 2009; EU: October 16, 2009	Notes: Developed by Naughty Dog; PlayStation 4 remaster developed by Bluepoint Games; Published by Sony Computer Entertainment; PlayStation 3 Game of the Year edition released in 2010, featuring bonus downloadable content; Included in Uncharted Dual Pack compilation; PlayStation 4 version released solely as part of the Uncharted: The Nathan Drake Collection compilation release
Uncharted 3: Drake's Deception Original release dates: NA: November 1, 2011; EU: November 2, 2011; JP: November 2, 2011; AU: November 3, 2011	Release years by system: 2011 – PlayStation 3; 2015 – PlayStation 4
Uncharted 3: Drake's Deception Original release dates: NA: November 1, 2011; EU: November 2, 2011; JP: November 2, 2011; AU: November 3, 2011	Notes: Developed by Naughty Dog; PlayStation 4 remaster developed by Bluepoint Games; Published by Sony Computer Entertainment; PlayStation 3 Game of the Year edition released in 2012, featuring bonus downloadable content; PlayStation 4 version released solely as part of the Uncharted: The Nathan Drake Collection compilation release
Uncharted 4: A Thief's End Original release date: WW: May 10, 2016	Release years by system: 2016 – PlayStation 4; 2022 – PlayStation 5, Windows
Uncharted 4: A Thief's End Original release date: WW: May 10, 2016	Notes: Developed by Naughty Dog; Published by Sony Interactive Entertainment; PlayStation 5 and Windows versions released as part of Uncharted: Legacy of Thieves Collection compilation
Uncharted: The Lost Legacy Original release date: NA: August 22, 2017; EU: August 22, 2017; JP: December 31, 2017; AU: August 22, 2017	Release years by system: 2017 – PlayStation 4; 2022 – PlayStation 5, Windows
Uncharted: The Lost Legacy Original release date: NA: August 22, 2017; EU: August 22, 2017; JP: December 31, 2017; AU: August 22, 2017	Notes: Developed by Naughty Dog; Published by Sony Interactive Entertainment; Standalone expansion to Uncharted 4; PlayStation 5 and Windows versions released as part of Uncharted: Legacy of Thieves Collection compilation

=== Spin-offs ===
Spin-off games
Game	Details
Uncharted: Drake's Trail Original release dates: EU: November 2007	Release years by system: 2007 – Web browser
Uncharted: Drake's Trail Original release dates: EU: November 2007	Notes: Developed by Bend Studio; Published by Sony Computer Entertainment; Online browser game prequel to Uncharted: Drake's Fortune
Uncharted: Golden Abyss Original release dates: JP: December 17, 2011; NA: February 22, 2012; EU: February 22, 2012; AU: February 23, 2012	Release years by system: 2011 – PlayStation Vita
Uncharted: Golden Abyss Original release dates: JP: December 17, 2011; NA: February 22, 2012; EU: February 22, 2012; AU: February 23, 2012	Notes: Developed by Bend Studio; Published by Sony Computer Entertainment; Action-adventure third-person shooter like the main series for portable console; Launch title for the PlayStation Vita
Uncharted: Fight for Fortune Original release dates: NA: December 4, 2012; EU: December 5, 2012; AU: December 19, 2012	Release years by system: 2012 – PlayStation Vita
Uncharted: Fight for Fortune Original release dates: NA: December 4, 2012; EU: December 5, 2012; AU: December 19, 2012	Notes: Developed by Bend Studio and One Loop Games; Published by Sony Computer Entertainment; Turn-based card game featuring cards based on characters, weapons and artifacts from the series; Downloadable content released with levels and cards based on Uncharted 2 and Uncharted 3
Uncharted: Fortune Hunter Original release dates: WW: May 5, 2016	Release years by system: 2016 – Android, iOS
Uncharted: Fortune Hunter Original release dates: WW: May 5, 2016	Notes: Developed by Playspree; Published by Sony Interactive Entertainment; Free-to-play mobile adventure puzzle game with integration with Uncharted 4

=== Compilations ===
Compilations
Game	Details
Uncharted Dual Pack Original release dates: EU: July 22, 2011; NA: September 6, 2011	Release years by system: 2011 – PlayStation 3
Uncharted Dual Pack Original release dates: EU: July 22, 2011; NA: September 6, 2011	Notes: Published by Sony Computer Entertainment; Contains Uncharted: Drake's Fortune, Uncharted 2: Among Thieves, and Uncharted: Eye of Indra motion comic
Uncharted: The Nathan Drake Collection Original release dates: EU: October 7, 2015; JP: October 8, 2015; NA: October 9, 2015; AU: October 9, 2015	Release years by system: 2015 – PlayStation 4
Uncharted: The Nathan Drake Collection Original release dates: EU: October 7, 2015; JP: October 8, 2015; NA: October 9, 2015; AU: October 9, 2015	Notes: PlayStation 4 remasters developed by Bluepoint Games; Published by Sony Computer Entertainment; Contains remastered versions of Uncharted: Drake's Fortune, Uncharted 2: Among Thieves, and Uncharted 3: Drake's Deception; Includes access to the multiplayer beta for Uncharted 4
Uncharted: Legacy of Thieves Collection Original release dates: WW: January 28, 2022	Release years by system: 2022 – PlayStation 5, Windows
Uncharted: Legacy of Thieves Collection Original release dates: WW: January 28, 2022	Notes: Contains remastered versions of Uncharted 4: A Thief's End and Uncharted: The Lost Legacy; Published by Sony Computer Entertainment; Windows version developed by Iron Galaxy

== Other media ==
=== Dramatizations ===
Dramatizations
Title	Release date(s)	Media type	Ref.
Uncharted: Drake's Fortune	2007	Motion comic	
Two-episode motion comic adaptation of the prologue of Uncharted: Drake's Fortune
Uncharted: Eye of Indra	October 22, 2009	Motion comic	
Four-episode motion comic prequel to Uncharted: Drake's Fortune; Illustrated by Marco Castiello; Released on the PlayStation Network
Uncharted	February 11, 2022	Film	
Film adaptation of the series produced by Sony Pictures and executive produced by PlayStation Productions.; Directed by Ruben Fleischer and starring Tom Holland as Nathan Drake.

=== Printed ===
Printed
Title	Release date(s)	Media type	Ref.
Uncharted: The Fourth Labyrinth	October 4, 2011	Novel	
Written by Christopher Golden; Published by Del Rey Books; A novel featuring a story not directly tied into the events of the games; ISBN 978-0-345-52217-7
Uncharted: Drake's Journal – Inside the Making of Uncharted 3: Drake's Deception	November 2011	Making-of book	
Written by Nolan North; Published by GameSpheres; Behind the scenes making-of book about the production of Uncharted 3 by the main voice actor; ISBN 978-0-615-55440-2
Uncharted	November 30, 2011	Comic book	
Written by Joshua Williamson, art by Sergio Sandoval; Published by DC Comics; Six-part miniseries set in between Uncharted and Uncharted 2; Released as a single book by DC Comics on July 17, 2012 (ISBN 978-1-4012-3269-6)
Uncharted: The Board Game	May 2012	Board game	
Designed by Hayato Kisaragi; Published by Bandai; Board game for one to four players
The Art of the Uncharted Trilogy	April 28, 2015	Concept art book	
Published by Dark Horse Books; Concept art from the first three Uncharted games; ISBN 978-1-61655-487-3
The Art of Uncharted 4	May 10, 2016	Concept art book	
Published by Dark Horse Books; Concept art from Uncharted 4; ISBN 978-1-61655-927-4

== Soundtracks ==
Soundtracks
Title	Release date	Release type	Ref.
Uncharted: Drake's Fortune Original Soundtrack from the Video Game	November 20, 2007	Album	
Composed by Greg Edmonson; Published by Sony Computer Entertainment; 21 tracks on a single disc with a duration of 1:00:44
Uncharted 2: Among Thieves Original Soundtrack from the Video Game	February 9, 2010	Album	
Composed by Greg Edmonson; Published by Sony Computer Entertainment; Released as a physical album by Sumthing Else Music Works on February 9, 2010; 23 tracks on a single disc with a duration of 1:02:52
Uncharted 3: Drake's Deception Original Video Game Soundtrack	October 25, 2011	Album	
Composed by Greg Edmonson; Published by La-La Land Records; Shorter, single-disc digital version titled Uncharted 3: Drake's Deception Original Soundtrack released by Sony Computer Entertainment on November 1, 2011; Short sampler album titled Uncharted 3: Drake's Deception Piggyback Soundtrack Exclusive released through Piggyback on November 2, 2011; 44 tracks on two discs with a duration of 2:02:05
Uncharted: Golden Abyss Original Soundtrack	February 22, 2012	Album	
Composed by Clint Bajakian with some tracks based on ones by Greg Edmonson; Published by Sony Computer Entertainment; 15 tracks on a single disc with a duration of 42:48
Uncharted: The Nathan Drake Collection	March 25, 2016	Box set	
Includes music from Uncharted, Uncharted 2, and Uncharted 3, composed by Greg Edmonson; Published by iam8bit; 44 tracks on 3 vinyl LP records with a duration of 1:59:30
Uncharted 4: A Thief's End Original Soundtrack	May 10, 2016	Album	
Composed by Henry Jackman with some tracks based on ones by Greg Edmonson; Published by Sony Interactive Entertainment; Released as a physical album by La-La Land Records on June 10, 2016; 2-disc vinyl LP version titled Uncharted 4: A Thief's End released by iam8bit in Q3 2016; 24 tracks on a single disc with a duration of 1:10:24
Uncharted: The Lost Legacy Original Soundtrack	August 22, 2017	Album	
Composed by Henry Jackman; Published by Sony Interactive Entertainment; 2-disc vinyl LP version titled Uncharted 4: A Thief's End planned for released by iam8bit in Q2 2018; 19 tracks on a single disc with a duration of 1:01:31
