= Janne Formoe =

Norwegian actress

- Born: 13 July 1975; Kristiansand Municipality
- Education: Norwegian National Academy of Theatre

Janne Formoe (born 13 July 1975) is a Norwegian actress.

== Career ==
She grew up in Kristiansand as a daughter of Terje Formoe. Her father established the Captain Sabertooth franchise, where Janne Formoe was a permanent cast member as Sunniva. She joined Agder Teater at the age of nine. In May 2000 she graduated from the Norwegian Academy of Theatre.

In 2003 she appeared in the film Buddy and the TV series Svarte penger, hvite løgner. She starred in plays ranging from The Master Builder to Dyrene i Hakkebakkeskogen and The Witches. She featured in radio dramas and audiobooks.

In the spring of 2004, she staged the solo show Neverending Story at Smuget. She also participated in a prank against Kristopher Schau, one of four hosts of Team Antonsen. Formoe gave the impression that she would spend the night with Schau, the buildup to which was filmed with hidden cameras before the prank was unveiled. The segment aired on Team Antonsen.

She joined the Hotel Cæsar cast as Mona Lizzie, and became a part of the long-running Karsten og Petra franchise as Petra's mother. She continued in Captain Sabertooth films, and joined the cast as main character Eva in TV Norge's Neste sommer.

She also started a podcast with Helén Vikstvedt, played Mari in TV 2's Farfar and sat on the judge's panel in Norske Talenter. In 2022 she starred in the female buddy film Jentetur, and ventured into stand up comedy, first in a show with Trine Lise Olsen and Isalill Kolpus.

== Personal life ==
In the late 1990s she was in a relationship with Espen Lind.

She started dating music producer Jan Fredrik Karlsen in March 2004. They moved to Nordstrand and had a daughter in 2005, but split up. Formoe moved to Grünerløkka. In the following years, Formoe and Karlsen restarted and ended the relationship several times, before marrying in 2022.
