= List of Ace Attorney media =

This is a list of entertainment media that is part of the Ace Attorney franchise.

== Video games ==
=== Main series ===
Game	Details
Phoenix Wright: Ace Attorney Original release date(s): JP: October 12, 2001; NA: October 12, 2005; EU: March 16, 2006; AU: March 8, 2007	Release years by system: 2001 - Game Boy Advance; 2005 - Nintendo DS; 2005 - PC; 2007 - Mobile phones 2009 - WiiWare
Phoenix Wright: Ace Attorney Original release date(s): JP: October 12, 2001; NA: October 12, 2005; EU: March 16, 2006; AU: March 8, 2007	Notes: Originally released for the Game Boy Advance as Gyakuten Saiban.; The Nintendo DS version and rereleases included an additional fifth case, as well as several Nintendo DS features, including the microphone, touchscreen, and ability to produce three-dimensional graphics.
Phoenix Wright: Ace Attorney – Justice for All Original release date(s): JP: October 18, 2002; NA: January 16, 2007; EU: March 16, 2007; AU: September 6, 2007	Release years by system: 2002 - Game Boy Advance; 2006 - Nintendo DS; 2006 - PC; 2010 - WiiWare
Phoenix Wright: Ace Attorney – Justice for All Original release date(s): JP: October 18, 2002; NA: January 16, 2007; EU: March 16, 2007; AU: September 6, 2007	Notes: Originally released for the Game Boy Advance as Gyakuten Saiban 2.
Phoenix Wright: Ace Attorney – Trials and Tribulations Original release date(s): JP: January 23, 2004; NA: October 23, 2007; EU: October 3, 2008	Release years by system: 2004 - Game Boy Advance; 2006 - PC; 2007 - Nintendo DS; 2010 - WiiWare
Phoenix Wright: Ace Attorney – Trials and Tribulations Original release date(s): JP: January 23, 2004; NA: October 23, 2007; EU: October 3, 2008	Notes: Originally released for the Game Boy Advance as Gyakuten Saiban 3.
Apollo Justice: Ace Attorney Original release date(s): JP: April 12, 2007; NA: February 19, 2008; EU: May 9, 2008; AU: May 22, 2008	Release years by system: 2007 - Nintendo DS; 2016 - iOS, Android; 2017 - Nintendo 3DS
Apollo Justice: Ace Attorney Original release date(s): JP: April 12, 2007; NA: February 19, 2008; EU: May 9, 2008; AU: May 22, 2008	Notes: Introduces a new protagonist called Apollo Justice, while former protagonist Phoenix Wright is relegated to a major supporting character.; Gyakuten Saiban Jiten, a digital encyclopedia for the first three games, was released as part of the game's limited edition.
Phoenix Wright: Ace Attorney – Dual Destinies Original release date(s): JP: July 25, 2013; NA/EU: October 24, 2013	Release years by system: 2013 - Nintendo 3DS; 2014 - iOS; 2017 - Android
Phoenix Wright: Ace Attorney – Dual Destinies Original release date(s): JP: July 25, 2013; NA/EU: October 24, 2013	Notes: It is the eighth total game in the Ace Attorney series and the fifth installment of the main lineage.; Phoenix Wright returns as a protagonist; Athena Cykes is also introduced as a third protagonist.
Phoenix Wright: Ace Attorney – Spirit of Justice Original release date(s): JP: June 9, 2016; NA/EU: OC : September 8, 2016	Release years by system: 2016 - Nintendo 3DS; 2017 - iOS, Android
Phoenix Wright: Ace Attorney – Spirit of Justice Original release date(s): JP: June 9, 2016; NA/EU: OC : September 8, 2016	Notes: It is the tenth total game in the Ace Attorney series and the sixth installment of the main lineage.

=== Spin-offs ===
Game	Details
Gyakuten Hanafuda Original release date(s): JP: 2004	Release years by system: 2004 - i-mode
Gyakuten Hanafuda Original release date(s): JP: 2004	Notes: Ace Attorney-themed hanafuda game for flip phones
Quiz Gyakuten Saiban Original release date(s): JP: 2005	Release years by system: 2005 - i-mode
Shōshin Test Original release date(s): JP: 2005	Release years by system: 2005 - i-mode
Shōshin Test Original release date(s): JP: 2005	Notes: Name in title refers to Dick Gumshoe, known in Japan as Keisuke Itonokogiri.
Gyakuten Saiban Poker Original release date(s): JP: March 1, 2007	Release years by system: 2007 - i-mode
Gyakuten Saiban Poker Original release date(s): JP: March 1, 2007	Notes: Available from March 1, 2007, to May 14, 2007.; Based on the first case from Apollo Justice: Ace Attorney, Turnabout Trump.
Gyakuten Saiban Jiten Original release date(s): JP: April 12, 2007	Release years by system: 2007 - Nintendo DS
Gyakuten Saiban Jiten Original release date(s): JP: April 12, 2007	Notes: Released alongside the Japanese collector's edition of Apollo Justice: Ace Attorney.
Ace Attorney Investigations: Miles Edgeworth Original release date(s): JP: May 28, 2009; NA: February 16, 2010; EU: February 19, 2010	Release years by system: 2009 - Nintendo DS; 2017 - iOS, Android
Ace Attorney Investigations: Miles Edgeworth Original release date(s): JP: May 28, 2009; NA: February 16, 2010; EU: February 19, 2010	Notes: Ace Attorney Investigations features Miles Edgeworth in the capacity of the protagonist for the first time in the series.; Features cameos from minor characters from previous entries in the series.; Had a Limited Edition version released simultaneously with the regular edition in Japan.
Ace Attorney Investigations 2: Prosecutor's Gambit Original release date(s): JP: February 3, 2011	Release years by system: 2011 - Nintendo DS; 2017 - iOS, Android
Ace Attorney Investigations 2: Prosecutor's Gambit Original release date(s): JP: February 3, 2011	Notes: The sequel to Ace Attorney Investigations: Miles Edgeworth.; Released in celebration of the franchise's 10th anniversary.
Gyakuten Puzzle: Substitution Gyakuten Original release date(s): JP: February 3, 2011	Release years by system: 2011 - i-mode
Professor Layton vs. Phoenix Wright: Ace Attorney Original release date(s): JP: November 29, 2012; EU: March 28, 2014; NA: August 29, 2014	Release years by system: 2012 - Nintendo 3DS
Professor Layton vs. Phoenix Wright: Ace Attorney Original release date(s): JP: November 29, 2012; EU: March 28, 2014; NA: August 29, 2014	Notes: A crossover game featuring the title characters of Ace Attorney and the Professor Layton series.
The Great Ace Attorney: Adventures Original release date(s): JP: July 9, 2015	Release years by system: 2015 - Nintendo 3DS; 2017 - iOS, Android
The Great Ace Attorney: Adventures Original release date(s): JP: July 9, 2015	Notes: A first half of prequel set over a century before the main series focusing on Ryūnosuke Naruhodō, Phoenix's ancestor.
The Great Ace Attorney 2: Resolve Original release date(s): JP: August 3, 2017	Release years by system: 2017 - Nintendo 3DS; 2018 - iOS, Android
The Great Ace Attorney 2: Resolve Original release date(s): JP: August 3, 2017	Notes: A final half of prequel set over a century before the main series focusing on Ryūnosuke Naruhodō, Phoenix's ancestor.
Gyakuten Saiban: VR20-gou Jiken Original release date(s): JP: July 19, 2021	Release years by system: 2021 - Quest 2
Gyakuten Saiban: VR20-gou Jiken Original release date(s): JP: July 19, 2021	Notes: A VR attraction that can only be played at Capcom Plaza.

=== Compilations ===
Game	Details
Phoenix Wright: Ace Attorney Trilogy Original release date(s): JP: February 7, 2012; NA: May 30, 2013; EU: May 30, 2013	Release years by system: 2012 - iOS, Android ("HD" release); 2014 - Nintendo 3DS; 2019 - PC, NS, PS4, XBO; 2022 - iOS, Android
Phoenix Wright: Ace Attorney Trilogy Original release date(s): JP: February 7, 2012; NA: May 30, 2013; EU: May 30, 2013	Notes: Remastered compilation of Phoenix Wright: Ace Attorney, Justice for All, and Trials and Tribulations.
The Great Ace Attorney Chronicles Original release date(s): WW: July 27, 2021	Release years by system: 2021 - PC, NS, PS4
The Great Ace Attorney Chronicles Original release date(s): WW: July 27, 2021	Notes: Remastered compilation of The Great Ace Attorney: Adventures and The Great Ace Attorney 2: Resolve.
Apollo Justice: Ace Attorney Trilogy Original release date(s): WW: January 25, 2024	Release years by system: 2024 - PC, NS, PS4, XBO
Apollo Justice: Ace Attorney Trilogy Original release date(s): WW: January 25, 2024	Notes: Remastered compilation of Apollo Justice: Ace Attorney, Dual Destinies, and Spirit of Justice.
Ace Attorney Investigations Collection Original release date(s): WW: September 6, 2024	Release years by system: 2024 - PC, NS, PS4, XBO
Ace Attorney Investigations Collection Original release date(s): WW: September 6, 2024	Notes: Remastered compilation of Ace Attorney Investigations: Miles Edgeworth and Ace Attorney Investigations 2: Prosecutor's Gambit.

== Printed media ==
- The Official Gyakuten Saiban Manga
- The Weekly Serialized Gyakuten Saiban Manga
- Turnabout Crossover
- Phoenix Wright: Ace Attorney Official Casebook: Vol. 1: The Phoenix Wright Files
- Phoenix Wright: Ace Attorney Official Casebook: Vol. 2: The Miles Edgeworth Files
- Gyakuten Saiban: Turnabout Idol
- Gyakuten Saiban: Turnabout Airport
- Gyakuten Saiban: Jikan Ryokosha no Gyakuten

== Theatre ==
- Ace Attorney: The Truth Reborn (musical, 2009)
- Ace Attorney 2: The Truth Reborn, Again... (musical, 2009)
- Ace Attorney 3: Prosecutor Miles Edgeworth (musical, 2013)
- Ace Attorney 2: Farewell, My Turnabout (stage show)
- Ace Attorney Investigations: Turnabout Teleportation (stage show)
- Ace Attorney: Turnabout Spotlight (stage show)
- Ace Attorney: Turnabout Gold Medal (stage show)
- The Great Ace Attorney: New Truth Reborn (musical, 2023)

== Film and television ==
- Ace Attorney (2012, live action)
- Ace Attorney (2016, anime)
