= Captain Sabertooth =

Norwegian brand and media franchise

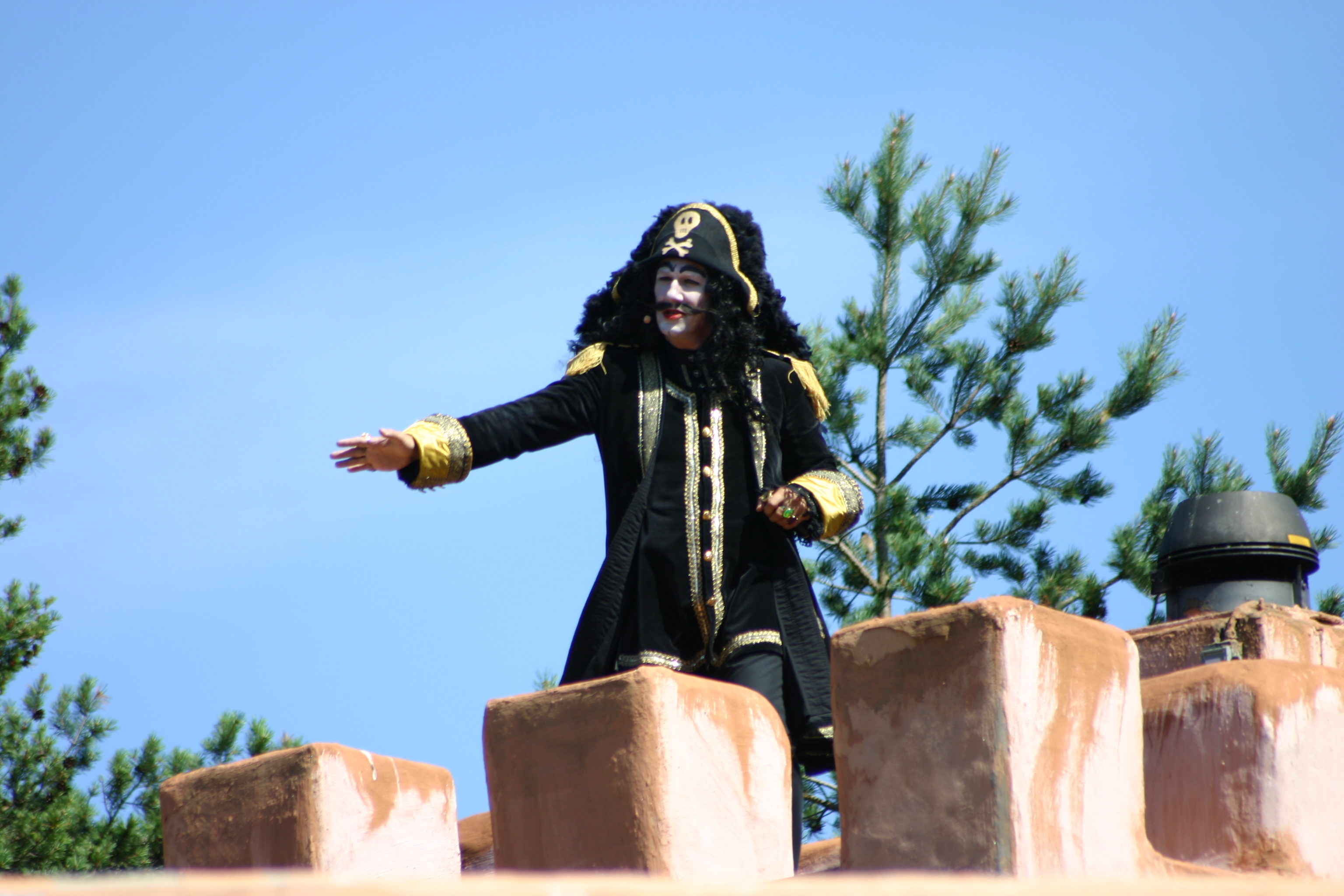
Captain Sabertooth, a fictional pirate from a series of popular Norwegian theater plays for children

Captain Sabertooth (in Norwegian: Kaptein Sabeltann) is a long running series that centers on the eponymous pirate Captain Sabertooth, who was created and originally portrayed by the Norwegian singer, composer, author and actor Terje Formoe. The series comprises several stage plays, theatrical films, a television series, cartoons, and books, all of which are aimed at small children.

The series was first launched as a series of stage plays. The first play, Captain Sabertooth and the Treasure in Luna Bay, was first performed in Kristiansand Zoo and Amusement Park in Norway where Formoe was Director of Entertainment. The play's success was so great that in 1994 it was followed up with another stage play, Captain Sabertooth and the Secret of Luna Bay, the music of which won Formoe a Spellemann prize, the Norwegian equivalent of the Grammy Awards. The plays have since been followed up with several theatrical films, which have proven to be very popular in Norway.

In 2014 the film Captain Sabertooth and the Treasure of Lama Rama was released. Its cost was 50 million Norwegian kroner (roughly US$6,600,000 or EUR 7,800,000 as of May 2015), making it the most expensive children's film to date in Norwegian history.

== Premise ==
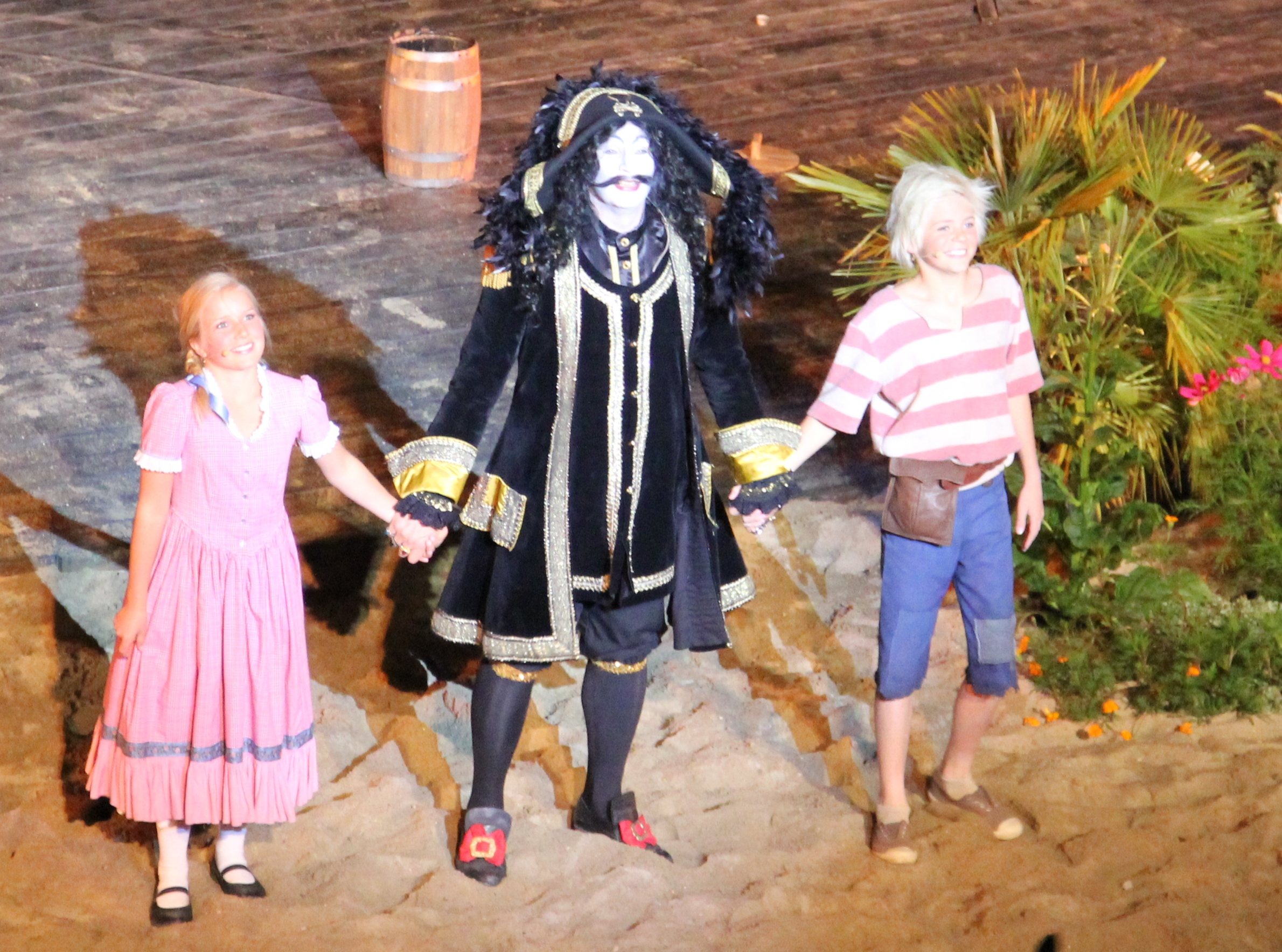
Captain Sabertooth performance with Terje Formoe in 2010

Captain Sabertooth is head of a band of pirates, who are sailing together in their ship called The Dark Lady (Den Sorte Dame). Among the other pirates are Pirate Wally (Pelle Pirat) a fat and somewhat clumsy man, and Tiny (Pinky), a young guy fighting for recognition from the other pirates.

Other characters are Red Rudy (Røde Ruben), a former sailor who lives together with Aunt Bessie (Tante Bassa) in Luna Bay (Kjuttavika). He wants to be an honest and peaceful man, but is maniacally interested in gold and jewels, an interest he shares with the pirates. He and Bessie work in a tavern together with her niece Veronica (Sunniva). Veronica and Tiny become friends.

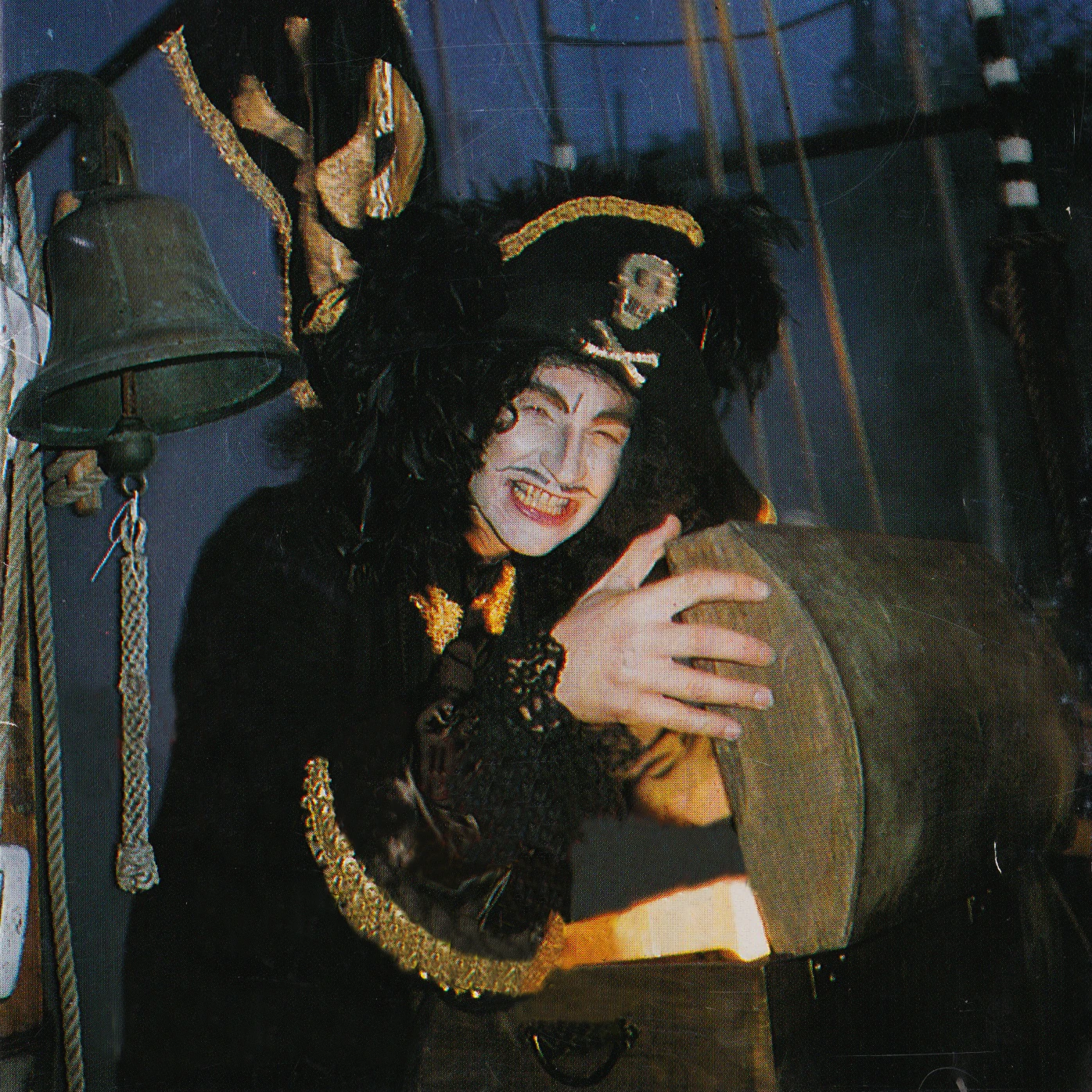
Terje formoe as Captain Sabertooth in 1991.

== Performances ==
=== Stage plays ===
Performance	Year	Notes
Kaptein Sabeltann og skatten i Kjuttaviga	Day-time show: 1990–1991 Evening show: 1992–1993 Made into a film in 1992.	
Kaptein Sabeltann og hemmeligheten i Kjuttaviga	1994, 1995	Played at Hvalstrand Bad in Asker as "Captain Sabertooth and Gory Gabriel's Treasure"
Kaptein Sabeltann – Jakten på den magiske diamant	1996, 1997	First full-length performance.
Kaptein Sabeltann og skatten i Kjuttaviga	1998, 1999	A merger of the first two plays.
Kaptein Sabeltann og den forheksede øya	2000, 2001	Svein Roger Karlsen plays Captain Sabertooth for the first time. Made into a film in 2000.
Kaptein Sabeltann – Jakten på den magiske diamant	2002, 2003	Partly new action from the performance recorded in 1996/1997. Filmed in 2002
Kaptein Sabeltann og Grusomme Gabriels skatt	2004, 2005, 2006	Partly new action from the performance recorded in 1998/1999. Filmed in 2005.
Kaptein Sabeltann og den forheksede øya	2007, 2008, 2009	Partly new action from the performance recorded in 2000/2001. Filmed in 2008.
Kaptein Sabeltann og Grusomme Gabriels skatt	2010	Identical to the performance recorded in 2004, 2005 and 2006. Terje Formoe once again performs as Captain Sabertooth
Kaptein Sabeltann og havets Hemmelighet	2011, 2012	Kyrre Haugen Sydness plays Sabertooth for the first time. Audun Meling has his last performance as Langmann
Kaptein Sabeltann og Grusomme Gabriels skatt	2013	
Kaptein Sabeltann – Jakten på den magiske diamant	2014, 2015	
Kaptein Sabeltann og den forheksede øya	2016, 2017	
Kaptein Sabeltann og Grusomme Gabriels skatt	2018, 2019	Håvard Bakke had his las performance as Langemann in 2019.
Kaptein Sabeltanns sjørøvernatt	2020	Kaptein Sabeltanns sjørøvernatt was a special play because of COVID-19
Kaptein Sabeltann og angrepet fra Gral	2021	Kaptein Sabeltann og angrepet fra Gral was also a special play because of the pandemic
Kaptein Sabeltann og havets hemmelighet	2022, 2023, 2024, 2025	In 2023 Kyrre Haugen Sydness had his last performance as Captain Sabertooth, Pål Christian Eggen is the new Captain Sabertooth and played his first play in 2024.
Kaptein Sabeltann og jakten på den magiske diamant	2026–?	It is confirmed that Kaptein Sabeltann og jakten på den magiske diamant will be played in 2026.

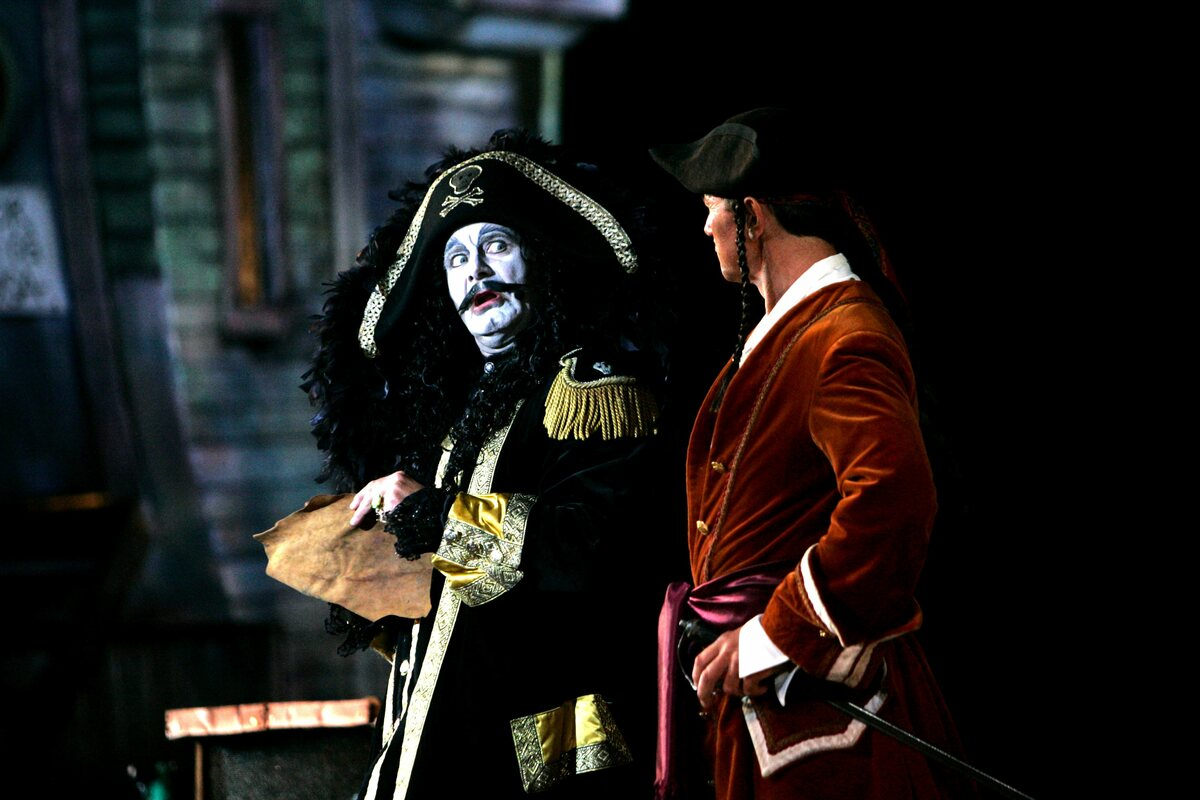
Svein Roger Karlsen as Captain Sabertooth and Audun Meling as Langemann in 2007

=== Filmography ===
- Kaptein Sabeltann og hemmeligheten i Kjuttaviga (1994)
- Drømmen om kaptein Sabeltanns rike (1996)
- Kaptein Sabeltann og den forheksede øya (2000)
- Kaptein Sabeltann og jakten på den magiske diamant (2002)
- Captain Sabertooth (2003)
- Captain Sabertooth and the Treasure of Lama Rama (2014)
- Captain Sabertooth and the Magic Diamond (2019)
- Captain Sabertooth and the Countess of Grail (2025)

== Cast ==
Role	Performed by	Years
Captain Sabertooth	Terje Formoe	1990–1999 and 2010
Captain Sabertooth	Svein Roger Karlsen	2000–2009
Captain Sabertooth	Kyrre Haugen Sydness	2011–2023
Captain Sabertooth	Pål Christian Eggen	2024–
Langemann	Audun Meling	1994–2011
Langemann	Håvard Bakke	2012–2019
Langemann	Martin Karelius Østensen	2020–
Pelle Pirat	Ingolf Karinen	1990–2009
Pelle Pirat	Kai Kenneth Hansson	2010–
Pysa Pirat	Knut Haugmark	1994–2003, 2007
Pysa Pirat	Ole-Hermann Gudim Lundberg	1995
Pysa Pirat	Kai Kenneth Hansson	2005, 2006, 2008, 2009
Pysa Pirat	Frank Ole Sætrang	2010–
Benjamin	Tor Sigbjørnsen	1998–2013
Benjamin	Dagfinn Tutturen	2014–
Skalken	Geir Atle Johnsen	2004, 2005, 2006
Skalken	Jakob Oftebro	2007
Skalken	Robert Skjærstad	2008–
Odin	Geir Atle Johnsen	1998–1999
Pinky	Morten Usterud	1990–1999
Pinky	Fredrik Hognerud Træland	1998–2001
Pinky	Odd-Audor Ridse Bentsen	2002–2003
Pinky	Ole Alfsen	2004–2006
Pinky	Kristian Fluge Sævig	2007–2009
Pinky	Ole Tobias Tveit	2010–2012
Pinky	Max August Key Graarud	2013–2015
Pinky	Paul fjell Gundersen	2016–2017
Pinky	Sebastian Sjåstad Overå	2018–2020
Pinky	Tobias Severinsen	2021–
Sjømannnen Ruben den Røde	Svein Haagensen	1990–1999
Sjømannnen Ruben den Røde	Hallvard Holmen	2004
Sjømannnen Ruben den Røde	Anderz Eide	2005–2006
Sjømannnen Ruben den Røde	Morten Svartveit	2010-2013
Sjømannnen Ruben den Røde	Ola G. Furuseth	2018–2019, 2022–
Tante Bassa	Linda Tørklep	1990–1999
Tante Bassa	Siw Anita Andersen	2004, 2005, 2006, 2010, 2013
Tante Bassa	Elisabeth Lindland	2011–2012
Tante Bassa	Janne Formoe	2018–2019
Tante Bassa	Ina Svenningdal	2022–
Sunniva	Janne Formoe	1990–1997
Sunniva	Helene Bøksle	1998, 1999
Sunniva	Hanne Nyborg Abrahamsen	1998–2001
Sunniva	Mari Hauge Mathisen	2002–2003
Sunniva	Nina Lund Feste	2004
Sunniva	Marie Berntsen	2005–2006
Sunniva	Marlen Hamsund	2007–2009
Sunniva	Ingrid Aarsland	2010–2012
Sunniva	Johanne Regine Svendsberget	2013–2015
Sunniva	Mathea Pedersen Kilane	2016–2020
Sunniva	Ida Rist	2021–2024
Sunniva	Eline aanensen	2025–
Mayor	Geir Atle Johnsen	2004–2006
Mayor	Richard Olsen	2010–2013
Mayor	Kikki Stormo	2018–2019, 2022–
Maga Kahn	Svein Haagensen	1996–1997
Maga Kahn	Anders Baasmo Christiansen	2002
Maga Kahn	Anders Mordal	2003
Maga Kahn	Frode Winther	2014–2015
Dronning Sirikit	Helén Vikstvedt	1996–1997
Dronning Sirikit	Janne Formoe	2002–2003
Dronning Sirikit	Ulrikke Døvigen	2014–2015
Malena Pirat	Linda Tørklep	1996–1997
Malena Pirat	Sidsel Ryen	2002–2003
Malena Pirat	Siw Anita Andersen	2014–2015
Marco	Roger André Federici	1996–1997
Marco	Ole Alfsen	2002–2003
Marco	Adam Eftevaag	2014–2015
Greven av Gral	Geir Atle Johnsen	2000–2001
Greven av Gral	Håvard Bakke	2007–2009, 2016–2017
Greven av Gral	Ola Magnus Gjermshus	2021–
Sibylla, Grevinnen av Gral	Sofie Bjerketvedt	2020–
Miriam av Gral	Janne Formoe	2000–2001
Miriam av Gral	Siw Anita Andersen	2007–2009
Miriam av Gral	Ingrid Jørgensen Dragland	2011
Miriam av Gral	Kjærsti Skjeldal	2012
Miriam av Gral	Ellen-Birgitte Winther	2016–2017
Miriam av Gral	Hennriette Faye-Schjøll	2020–
Lola	Helén Vikstvedt	2000–2001
Lucifer	Jan Gunnar Røise	2000–2001
Piodor	Anders Baasmo Christiansen	2000–2001
Grisk	Hans Rønningen	2007–2009, 2016
Grisk	Jørn Morstad	2017
Slu	Silje Lundblad	2007–2009
Slu	Kristin Grue	2016–2017
Grufull	Ingrid Jørgensen Dragland	2007–2009
Grufull	Ida Holten Worsøe	2016–2017
Glade Gorm	Espen Løvås	2004, 2005, 2006, 2010, 2013 2018–2019
Tøge	Igor Necemer	2004, 2006, 2010, 2013
Tøge	Ask Vibe Sama	2005
Tyra	Ida Holten Worsøe	2018–2019
Birk	Esben Vinsnes	2004, 2005, 2006, 2010
Birk	Dagfinn Tutturen	2013
Roger	Jacob Emil Klingen Borg	2010
Maga Kahns soldat #1	Geir Atle Johnsen	1996, 1997, 2002, 2003
Maga Kahns soldat #2	Tor Sigbjørnsen	1996–1997
Maga Kahns soldat #2	Jan Gunnar Røise	2002
Maga Kahns soldat #2	Hans Petter Meirik	2003
Morgan	Esben Vinsnes	2007–2009
Morgan	Svein Roger Karlsen	2011–2012
Morgan	Igor Necemer	2016–2017
Morgan	Per Emil Grimstad	2022–

== Merchandise ==
=== Books ===
- 1993: Kaptein Sabeltann og 40 andre sanger, the first song book
- 1993: Kaptein Sabeltann og gutten som ville bli sjørøver, illustrated by Gro Vik Fiadu and Morten Myklebust
- 1994: Kaptein Sabeltann og jakten på sultanens skatt!, illustrated by Morten Myklebust
- 1994: Kaptein Sabeltann lukter gull
- 1995: Kaptein Sabeltann og Joachim : på eventyr med Den sorte dame, picture book illustrated by Morten Myklebust
- 1995: Kaptein Sabeltann : hvor er nøkkelen? : en myldrebok, idea, text and drawings by Egil Nyhus
- 1996: Kaptein Sabeltanns store sangbok, illustrated by Egil Nyhus
- 2001: Kaptein Sabeltann og heksegryta, children's picture book with idea, text and drawings by Egil Nyhus
- 2002: Pinky blir en av Kaptein sabeltanns menn
- 2003: Kaptein Sabeltann og Pinky på tokt med Den sorte dame, picture book illustrated by Egil Nyhus
- 2005: Kaptein Sabeltann og Pinky på skattejakt i Kjuttaviga, picture book illustrated by Egil Nyhus
- 2005: Kaptein Sabeltanns sangbok: Hiv o'hoi snart er skatten vår!, illustrated by Egil Nyhus
- 2007: Kaptein Sabeltanns sangbok 2 : Kongen på havet, the 4th song book
- 2008: Kaptein Sabeltann pekebok, illustrated by Egil Nyhus
- 2008: Terje Formoe/Egil Nyhus: Kapteins Sabeltanns 10 MYNTER AV GULL – the first pop-up book in Norway
- 2009: Terje Formoe/Egil Nyhus: Miriams forheksede hus – children's picture book with pockets
- 2009: Formoe/Nyhus: Kaptein Sabeltann og bokstavjakten – an alphabet book
- 2010: Pinky og Sunniva i Kaptein Sabeltanns Verden
- 2011: Kaptein Sabeltann og Pinky på den forheksede øya
- 2012: Kaptein Sabeltann, Pinky og Ravn i Abra Havn – book about the third episode of the TV-series Kaptein Sabeltann-kongen på havet
- 2013: Kaptein Sabeltann og blindpassasjerene – book about the first episode of the TV-series
- 2012: Formoe/Nyhus: Kaptein Sabeltanns puslespillbok – a puzzle book
- 2013: Kaptein Sabeltann og heksegryta – republished with stickers
- 2013: Formoe/Nyhus: Min første bok om Kaptein Sabeltann
- 2013: Formoe/Nyhus: Kaptein Sabeltann – Den Sorte Dame
- 2014: Formoe/Nyhus: Kaptein Sabeltann og skattekartet
- 2014: Formoe/Nyhus: Kaptein Sabeltann – to sanger og åtte kjente sanger

=== Comics and magazines ===
- 1994: Kaptein Sabeltann og jakten på sultanens skatt!, illustrated by Morten Myklebust
- 2000–2005: Kaptein Sabeltann aktivitetsblad, released four times a year
- Kaptein Sabletanns advent calendar
- 2006: Kaptein Sabletanns verden, monthly magazine

=== Games ===
- 1997: Kaptein Sabeltann og den store ildprøven, CD-ROM, directed by Simen Svale Skogsrud
- 2004: Kaptein Sabeltann, CD-ROM, produced by Artplant AS, published by Pan Vision in Stockholm, based on Terje Formoe figures
- 2007: Kaptein Sabeltann og grusomme Gabriels forbannelse, CD-ROM, produced by Artplant AS, published by NSD
- 2011: Kaptein Sabeltann, Nintendo DS, manufactured by Ravn Studio AS, release date 1 July
- 2014: Kaptein Sabeltann på nye tokt, iPhone/iPad, produced by Ravn Studio AS
- 2020: Captain Sabertooth and the Magic Diamond, PC/Switch, produced by Ravn Studio AS – https://store.steampowered.com/app/1383970/Captain_Sabertooth_and_the_Magic_Diamond/ & https://www.nintendo.co.uk/Games/Nintendo-Switch-download-software/Captain-Sabertooth-and-the-Magic-Diamond-1880242.html?nsuid=70010000029625

== Captain Sabertooth's World ==
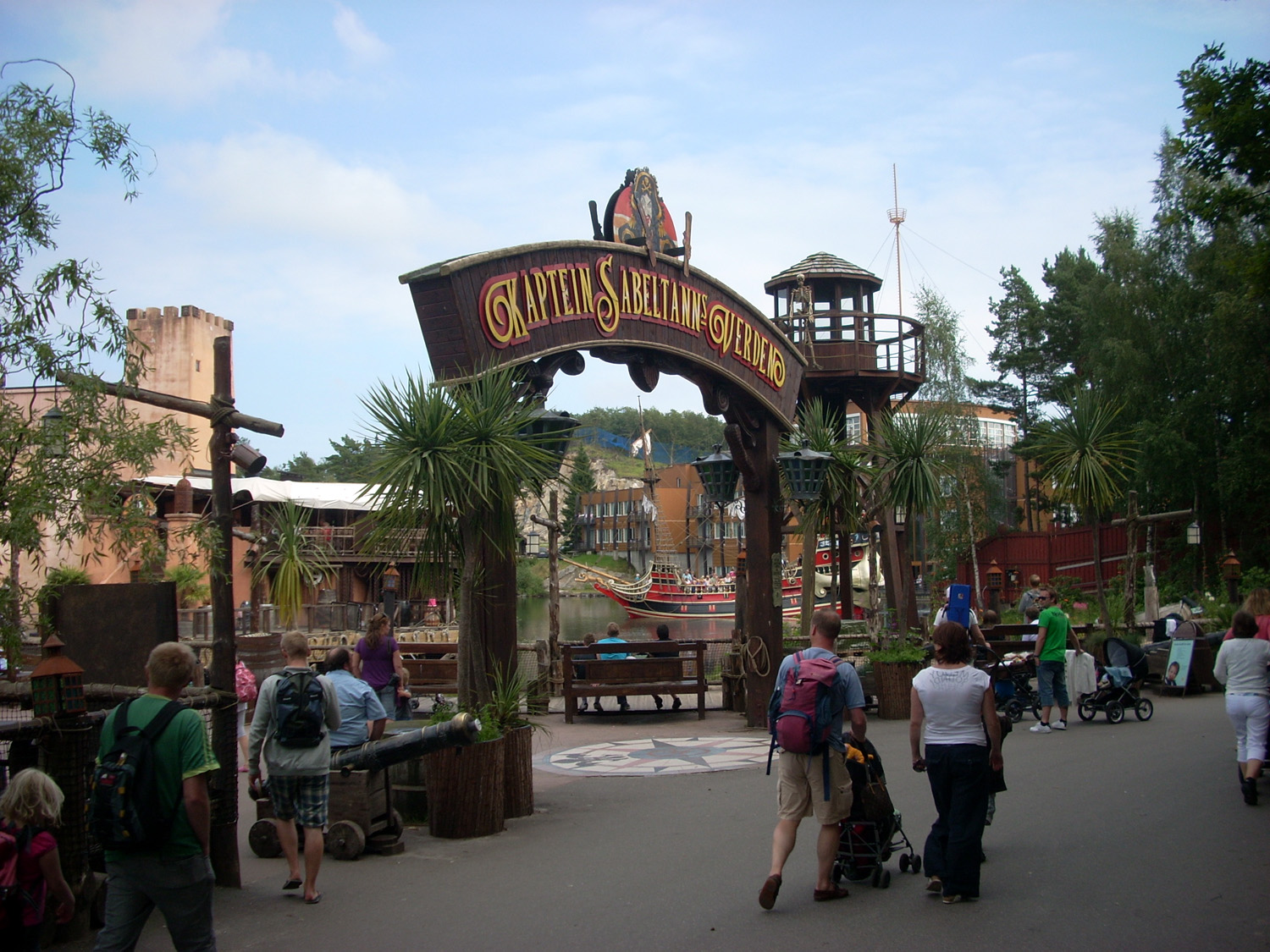
The gates to Captain Sabertooth's World

In 1995 a Captain Sabertooth themed section of the Kristiansand Zoo and Amusement Park was opened. The area has a pirate village theme and contains various attractions, restaurants, and shops that are centered around the character of Captain Sabertooth and the other characters in the series. In the summer the park holds several shows and features, including one that allows guests to ride on Sabertooth's ships The Dark Lady and The Countess.

== Abra Havn ==
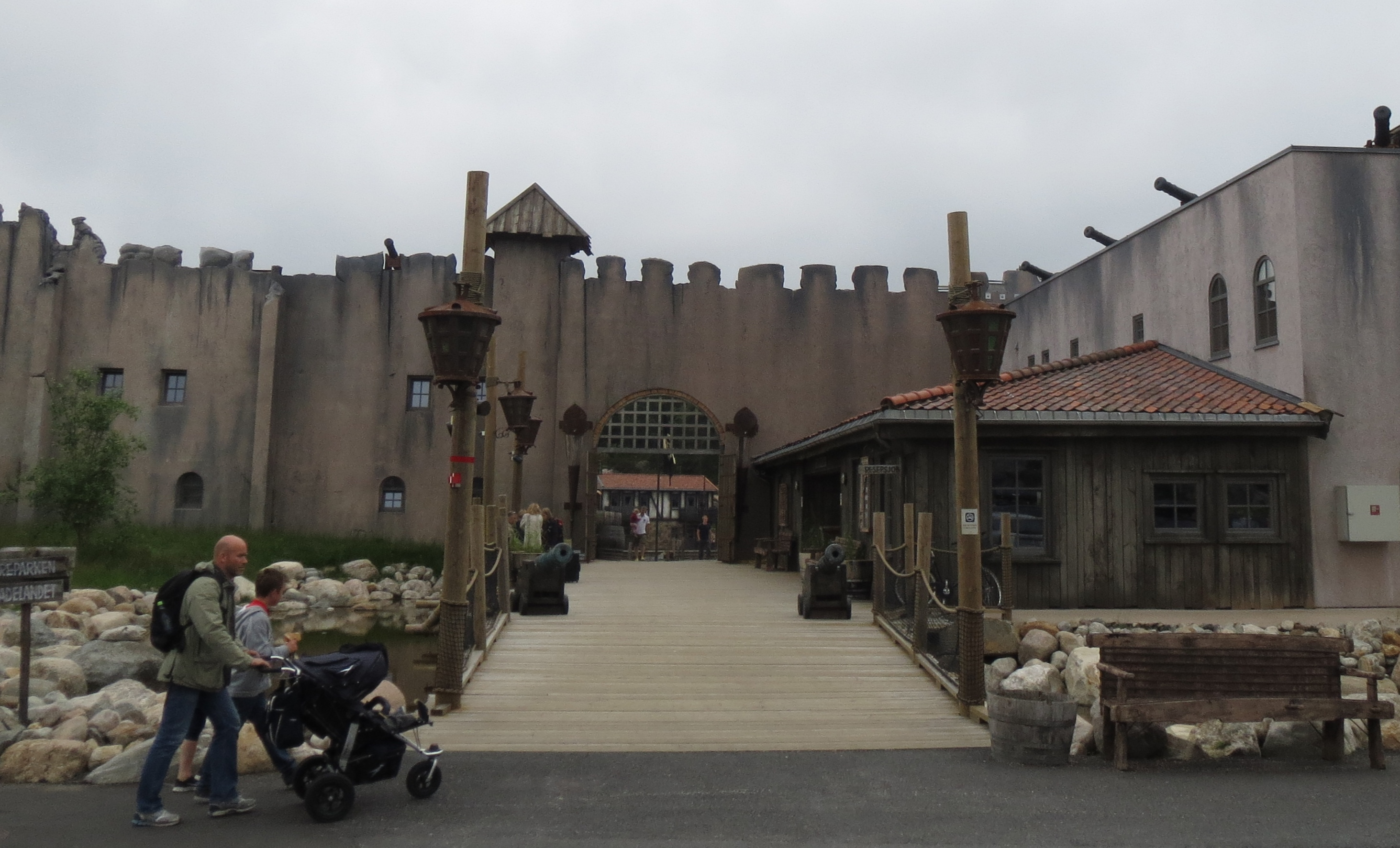
Abra Havn

On the eastern side of the small lake by Captain Sabertooth's World is built a pirate village called Abra Havn. The pirate village consists of buildings that gives an illusion of a pirate society, surrounded by a high wall. During the high season apartments are rented out inside the pirate village.
