= Tekken Comic =

Japanese manga

鉄拳コミック (Tekken Komikku)
- Manga
- Written by: Rui Takato
- Published by: Shueisha
- Magazine: Ultra Jump
- Original run: October 19, 2009 – July 17, 2010
- Volumes: 2

Tekken Comic (鉄拳コミック, Tekken Komikku; lit. Iron Fist) is a manga series created by Rui Takato based on the eponymous series of fighting games. The manga was created in honor of the 15th anniversary of the Tekken game series and is available with permission from Bandai Namco in the online version of the magazine Ultra Jump. The first printed volume of the manga was published on March 19, 2010.

The manga features a plot based on Tekken 6 with some differences. For example, the early chapters focus more on Asuka Kazama and Lili, and the Mishima family is mentioned only in the first chapter.

== Story ==
Jin Kazama, the owner of the powerful Japanese corporation Mishima Zaibatsu, declares war on the entire world. Nations that sided with the corporation merged into one independent nation, destroying any opposition. A year later, the Mishima Zaibatsu organization opens "The King of Iron Fist Tournament", declaring that the victor will be guaranteed a great prize. However, the tournament is interrupted by Asuka Kazama, who attacks Jin and demands that he stop his despotic ambitions.

== Characters ==
In contrast to the game series, the characters and relationships in the manga are different. For example, Lili is more than silly and whimsical, her servant Leo is older, and Sebastian and Alisa Bosconovich from the beginning of the manga act on the orders of Jin Kazama.

== Publication ==
The first six chapters were published on the official website of the journal Ultra Jump, starting from October 19, 2009, and published monthly. On March 19, 2010, in Japan, the first manga volume was published.

== Volume list ==
No.	Japanese release date	Japanese ISBN
1	March 19, 2010	978-4-08-877826-6
Battle 1: Legend of the Phoenix; Battle 2: Girl Bomb; Battle 3: Wild Flower; Battle 4: Dusk's Paper Airplane; Battle 5: Reason
Chapters focus on Asuka Kazama who decided to confront Mishima Zaibatsu CEO Jin Kazama, the mastermind behind starting a global war.
2	September 19, 2010	978-4-08-879019-0
Battle 6: Little Wish; Battle 7: Reborn; Battle 8: Angel Night; Battle 9: Three souls; Battle 10: Unchained heart; Battle 11: Dawn's Legend
Upon learning of the bankruptcy of her father's own company, Lili decides to infiltrate the Mishima Zaibatsu organization. Asuka and Leo become involved, not realizing that Jin has a plan to battle with his own father Kazuya Mishima. And this battle is one in which nobody should interfere with...
