= Terje Formoe =

Norwegian actor, musician and writer

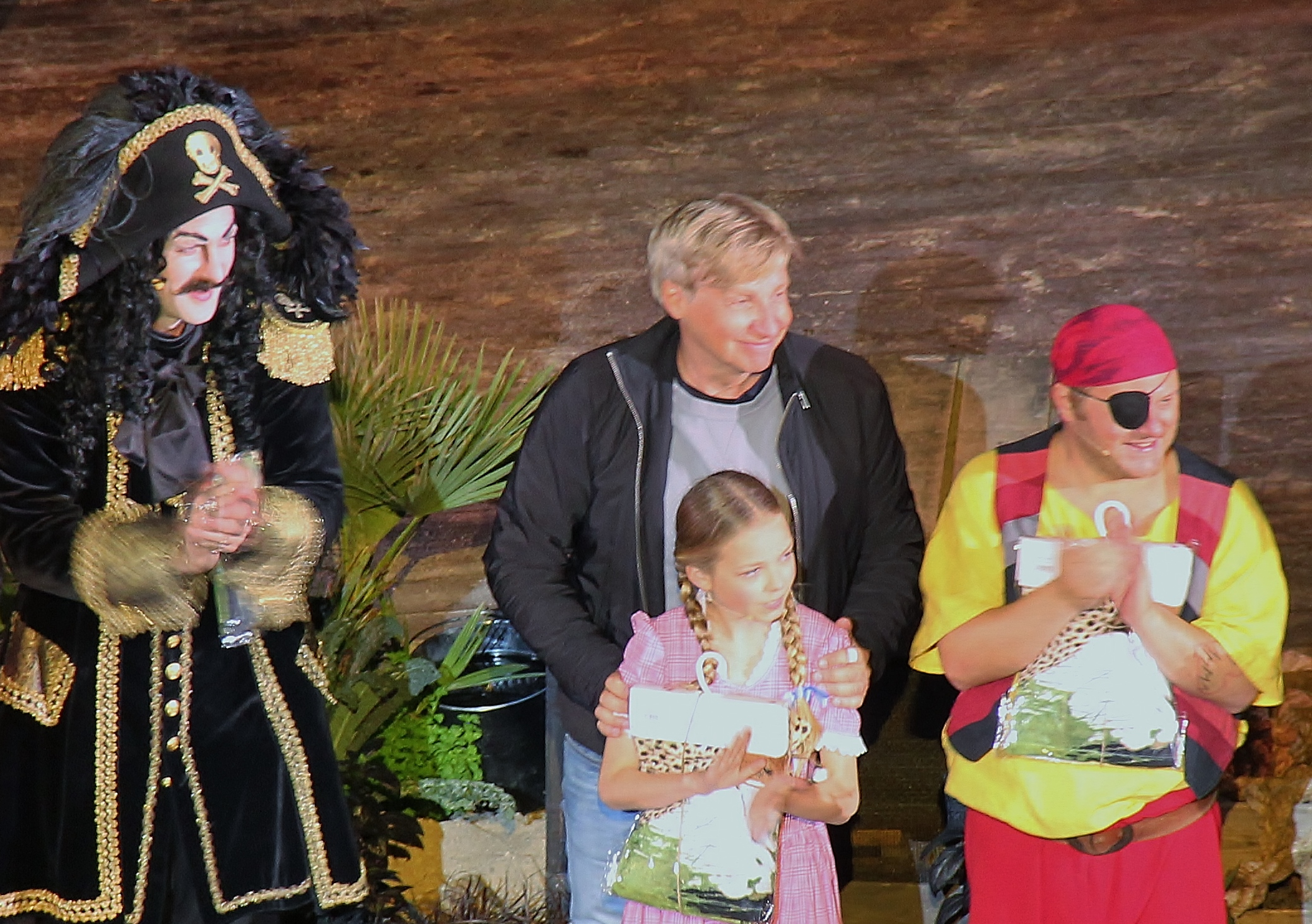
- Terje Formoe at the premiere show in 2016. Kyrre Haugen Sydness is Captain Sabertooth
- Born: 6 December 1949 (age 75); Fredrikstad, Norway
- Occupation(s): Songwriter, actor, playwright and author
- Children: Janne Formoe

Terje Falk Formoe (born 6 December 1949) is a Norwegian singer, songwriter, actor, playwright and author.

Born in Fredrikstad, Norway, he was educated as a schoolteacher. In the 1970s, he began making records of his music. He currently lives in Kristiansand.

He was the marketing and entertainment chief at Kristiansand Zoo and Amusement Park in the early 1980s. He became known for his song about the ape Julius, which appeared on his album of 1983. In the 1990s, he became well known for his plays about the pirate Captain Sabertooth; he also played the title role for several years.

He is the father of Janne Formoe, an actress and TV personality.

== Music ==
- 1975: Beske ballader og blidgjort blues (Bitter Ballads and Beautiful Blues)
- 1980: Scenespill (Play on the Stage)
- 1983: Livet er toppen! (Life is Great)
- 1987: Til Donald (To Donald)
- 1992: Kaptein Sabeltann og skatten i Kjuttaviga (Captain Sabertooth and the Treasure in Kjuttaviga)
- 1993: Vår dyreverden (Our Animal Planet)
- 1993: Kjell Pell Pottitskrell
- 1994: Kaptein Sabeltann og hemmeligheten i Kjuttaviga (Captain Sabertooth and the Secret in Kjuttaviga)
- 1995: Ville venner og Sabeltenner (Wild Friends and Saberteeth)
- 1996: Kaptein Sabeltann og jakten på den magiske diamant (Captain Sabertooth and the Hunt for the Magical Diamond)
- 1997: Syng med og syng selv (Sing Along and Sing Yourself)
- 1998: Kaptein Sabeltanns verden, dobbel samleplate (Captain Sabertooth's World)
- 1999: Kaptein Sabeltann og den forheksede øya (Captain Sabertooth and the Bewitched Island)
- 2000: Kaptein Sabeltann og den forheksede øya, dobbel utgave (Captain Sabertooth and the Bewitched Island)
- 2001: Umaskert (Unmasked)
- 2002: Kaptein Sabeltann og Sultanens skatt (Captain Sabertooth and the Sultan's Treasure)
- 2002: Kaptein Sabeltann og jakten på den magiske diamant, ny versjon (Captain Sabertooth and the Hunt for the Magical Diamond, new edition)
- 2003: Kaptein Sabeltann, filmmusikk (Captain Sabertooth, soundtrack music)
- 2004: Syng med og syng selv II (Sing Along and Sing Yourself II)
- 2006: Hiv o'hoi! : Kaptein Sabeltanns favoritter, musikk (Hiv o'Hoi! : Captain Sabertooth's Favorites, music)
- 2009: Kaptein Sabeltann og Den Forheksede Øya (2009-album) (Captain Sabertooth and the Bewitched Island, new edition)
- 2009: Kaptein Sabeltann og Grusomme Gabriels Skatt (Captain Sabertooth and Gory Gabriels treasure)
- 2010: Kaptein Sabeltann og Havets Hemmelighet (Captain Sabertooth and oceans secrets)
- 2010: Kaptein Sabeltanns Gull (Captain Sabertooths gold)
- 2011: Et Sted Under Stjernene (A place under the stars)
- 2012: Kaptein Sabeltann i Abra Havn (Captain Sabertooth in Abra Harbour)
- 2013: Kaptein Sabeltann Enda Mere Gull (Captain Sabertooth even more gold)
- 2015: Timeglass (Hourglass)
- 2015: Kaptein Sabeltann og Jakten på Den Magiske Diamant sangene (Captain Sabertooth and the hunt for the magical diamond songs)

== Books ==
- 1980: Toner i et timeglass, musikknoter (Notes in an Hourglass, sheet music)
- 1991: Julius : sanghefte (Julius: Songbook)
- 1993: Kaptein Sabeltann og 24 andre sanger (Captain Sabertooth and 24 Other Songs)
- 1994: Kaptein Sabeltann og jakten på sultanens skatt! (Captain Sabertooth and the Hunt for the Sultan's Treasure)
- 1995: Kaptein Sabeltann og Joachim : på eventyr med Den sorte dame (Captain Sabertooth and Joachim: The Adventure with "The Black Lady")
- 1996: Kaptein Sabeltanns store sangbok (Captain Sabertooth's Big Songbook)
- 2001: Kaptein Sabeltann og gutten som ville bli sjørøver (Captain Sabertooth and the Boy Who Wanted to be a Pirate)
- 2002: Pinky blir en av Kaptein Sabeltanns menn (Pinky Joins Captain Sabertooth's Crew)
- 2003: Kaptein Sabeltann og Pinky på tokt med Den sorte dame (Captain Sabertooth and Pinky Cruising on "The Black Lady")
- 2005: Kaptein Sabeltann og Pinky på skattejakt i Kjuttaviga (Captain Sabertooth and Pinky on a Treasure Hunt in Kjuttaviga)
- 2005: Kaptein Sabeltanns sangbok 1: Hiv o'hoi snart er skatten vår! (Captain Sabertooth's Songbook 1: Hiv o'hoi, Soon the Treasure is Ours)
- 2007: Kaptein Sabeltanns sangbok 2: Kongen på Havet (Captain Sabertooth's Songbook 2: The Ocean King)
