= Stephen Barton =

British composer (born 1982)

- Born: 17 September 1982 (age 43); Preston, Lancashire, England
- Genres: Film scores
- Occupation: Composer
- Website: www.stephenbarton.com

Stephen Barton (born 17 September 1982) is a British composer who lives in London and Los Angeles. He has composed the music for dozens of major film, television, and video game projects, and has won two SCL Awards, a Grammy Award, and a BAFTA nomination for his work.

== Early life ==
As a child, Barton became a cathedral chorister at the age of eight in the Winchester Cathedral Choir. He toured internationally with the choir in the United States, Australia and Europe, including concerts in Sydney Opera House, the Royal Albert Hall, and Carnegie Hall; and performing on numerous albums and television broadcasts. He subsequently won a Department for Education specialist music scholarship to study piano and composition at Wells Cathedral School. At 18, he became an assistant to the composer Harry Gregson-Williams, working for him on numerous film scores before branching out to form his own company in 2009.

== Video games ==
In 2007, he wrote the score for Call of Duty 4: Modern Warfare (with Harry Gregson-Williams). He teamed up with the same developers at their new company Respawn Entertainment to work on the music for Titanfall, an online-only multiplayer shooter. Barton also created the music for the 2016 sequel, Titanfall 2. In 2019, he composed the original music for Titanfall’s battle royale sibling, Apex Legends, including the now iconic four note theme motif, and has continued to compose over three hours of music for all subsequent seasons of the game.

In 2019, he also co-composed the score for Star Wars Jedi: Fallen Order, which won the Society of Composers and Lyricists inaugural award for Best Original Game Score, as well as Music of the Year from G.A.N.G., amongst other awards. In 2023, he composed the score for the sequel, Star Wars Jedi: Survivor. In March 2024, it was announced Barton would compose the upcoming video game Marvel 1943: Rise of Hydra (2026) developed and published by Skydance New Media.

== Film and television ==
Barton's film work include scores for Unlocked, Cirque du Soleil: Worlds Away, Jennifer's Body, Tom Dolby and Tom Williams' debut feature Last Weekend, Line of Fire, Mrs. Palfrey at the Claremont and the BAFTA nominated thriller Exam. He also contributed music for the Narnia and Shrek franchises (including the "Fairy Godmother Song" from Shrek 2) as well as Ridley Scott's Kingdom of Heaven, Tony Scott's Man On Fire and Ben Affleck's Gone, Baby Gone.

In television, he scored two seasons of the TV adaptation of 12 Monkeys, and has collaborated extensively on nature documentaries with Natural History New Zealand and the Discovery Channel.

Chris Prynoski, the animator behind the hallucination scene in Beavis and Butt-Head Do America, heard Barton's score for Call of Duty: Modern Warfare and asked him to score Titmouse's animated series G.I. Joe: Resolute, which led to a further collaboration on a series for Disney, Motorcity. In addition to those he also co-wrote the music for MTV's Disco Destroyer, a project conceived by Scott Mosier, Jim Mahfood and Joe Casey and animated by Titmouse, composing the score with guitarist Mick Murphy. Subsequently, he scored Titmouse's Niko and the Sword of Light series for Amazon Studios.

In 2022, Barton served as the primary composer for season three of Star Trek: Picard, which was released in 2023. He was the sole composer for the first six episodes of the season and shared composing duties with Frederik Wiedmann for the final four episodes. Barton incorporated themes and styles from many prior Star Trek composers, notably including Jerry Goldsmith and James Horner, combining them with his own original music.

== Other work ==
Barton has collaborated frequently with Sir Anthony Hopkins since producing the soundtrack for the film Slipstream in 2006. He produced the Decca album "Composer", which topped the UK Classical charts for a month in 2012, as well as collaborating with Hopkins on the production of "And The Waltz Goes On" with André Rieu, which won the Classic FM "Album Of The Year" award in the Classic Brit Awards 2012. As a pianist he has performed extensively as a soloist with numerous orchestras including the Dallas Symphony Orchestra, Colorado Symphony, City of Birmingham Symphony Orchestra, and the Brussels Philharmonic, as well as on numerous movie soundtracks and diverse albums including Hybrid's I Choose Noise and playing the mellotron on a cover of Snowblind for Fireball Ministry's eponymously titled album in 2010.

He has been a consultant in the emerging field of spatial and immersive audio, working with the BBC and Qualcomm. Barton also serves as a committee member of the National Academy of Recording Arts and Sciences and a founder member of the Abbey Road Studios Spatial Audio Forum.

== Discography ==
=== Film scores ===
Year	Title	Director(s)	Notes
2005	Mrs. Palfrey at the Claremont	Dan Ireland	—N/a
2009	The Six Wives of Henry Lefay	Howard Michael Gould	—N/a
2009	Exam	Stuart Hazeldine	Co-composed with Matthew Cracknell
2009	Jennifer's Body	Karyn Kusama	Co-composed with Theodore Shapiro
2012	Dino Time	John Kafka; Yoon-suk Choi	Co-composed with Loren Gold
2013	Line of Duty	Bryan Ramirez	—N/a
2014	4 Minute Mile	Charles-Olivier Michaud	—N/a
2014	Last Weekend	Tom Dolby; Tom Williams	—N/a
2017	Unlocked	Michael Apted	—N/a

==== Other credits ====
Year	Title	Director(s)	Composer(s)	Notes
2003	Sinbad: Legend of the Seven Seas	Patrick Gilmore; Tim Johnson	Harry Gregson-Williams	Additional Music
2004	Man on Fire	Tony Scott	Harry Gregson-Williams; Lisa Gerrard	Conductor, music arranger and programmer.
2004	Shrek 2	Andrew Adamson; Conrad Vernon; Kelly Asbury	Harry Gregson-Williams	Additional music
2004	Return to Sender	Bille August	Harry Gregson-Williams	Additional music
2004	Team America: World Police	Trey Parker	Harry Gregson-Williams	Additional music
2004	Bridget Jones: The Edge of Reason	Beeban Kidron	Harry Gregson-Williams	Additional music
2005	Kingdom of Heaven	Ridley Scott	Harry Gregson-Williams	Additional music
2005	The Chronicles of Narnia: The Lion, the Witch and the Wardrobe	Andrew Adamson	Harry Gregson-Williams	Additional music
2006	Seraphim Falls	David Von Ancken	Harry Gregson-Williams	Additional music
2006	Flushed Away	David Bowers; Sam Fell	Harry Gregson-Williams	Additional music and arranger
2006	Déjà Vu	Tony Scott	Harry Gregson-Williams	Music programmer
2007	The Number 23	Joel Schumacher	Harry Gregson-Williams	Music programmer
2007	Shrek the Third	Chris Miller	Harry Gregson-Williams	Additional music and arranger
2007	Slipstream	Anthony Hopkins	Harry Gregson-Williams	Arranger and orchestrator
2007	Gone Baby Gone	Ben Affleck	Harry Gregson-Williams	Additional music arranger
2008	The Chronicles of Narnia: Prince Caspian	Andrew Adamson	Harry Gregson-Williams	Additional music
2008	Jolene	Dan Ireland	Harry Gregson-Williams	Additional music
2012	Cirque du Soleil: Worlds Away	Andrew Adamson	Harry Gregson-Williams	Additional music
2024	Gladiator II	Ridley Scott	Harry Gregson-Williams	Orchestrator

=== Television ===
Year	Programme	Network	Episode(s)	Notes
2009	G.I. Joe: Resolute	Adult Swim	11	—N/a
2012	Motorcity	Disney XD	16	Theme music composed by Brendon Small
2013	Liquid Television	MTV	1	Composer for pilot episode only
2015–2017	Niko and the Sword of Light	Amazon Video	14	—N/a
2017–2018	12 Monkeys	Syfy	16	Co-composed with Bryce Jacobs, Paul Linford and Trevor Rabin
2023	Star Trek: Picard	Paramount+	10	Composer for Season 3 only

=== Video games ===
Year	Title	Studio(s)	Notes
2007	Call of Duty 4: Modern Warfare	Activision; Infinity Ward	Theme music composed by Harry Gregson-Williams; Nominated — Best Original Score for a Video Game or Interactive Media
2010	How to Train Your Dragon	Activision; Étranges Libellules; Griptonite Games	—N/a
2014	Titanfall	Electronic Arts; Respawn Entertainment	Nominated — NAVGTR Award for Best Original Dramatic Score, New IP
2016	Titanfall 2	Electronic Arts; Respawn Entertainment	Nominated — D.I.C.E. Award for Outstanding Achievement in Original Music Composition
2019	Apex Legends	Electronic Arts; Respawn Entertainment	—N/a
2019	Star Wars Jedi: Fallen Order	Electronic Arts; Respawn Entertainment	Co-composed with Gordy Haab
2020	Watch Dogs: Legion	Ubisoft	—N/a
2023	Star Wars Jedi: Survivor	Electronic Arts; Respawn Entertainment	Co-composed with Gordy Haab; Won — Grammy Award for Best Score Soundtrack for Video Games and Other Interactive Media; Nominated — D.I.C.E. Award for Outstanding Achievement in Original Music Composition; Nominated — British Academy Games Award for Music
2024	MultiVersus	Warner Bros. Interactive Entertainment; Player First Games	Co-composed with Gordy Haab and Kevin Notar
2024	The First Descendant	Nexon	Won — BMI Film, TV & Visual Media Awards
2026	Star Fox	Nintendo; Velan Studios	—N/a
2026	Call of Duty: Modern Warfare 4	Activision; Infinity Ward	—N/a
2027	Marvel 1943: Rise of Hydra	Skydance New Media	—N/a
