= Arashi: Castles of Sin =

2021 virtual reality stealth game

- PlayStation 4 cover art
- Developer: Endeavor One
- Publishers: Prep Games; Skydance Interactive (Final Cut)
- Composer: Johnny Goss
- Engine: Unity 3D
- Platforms: PlayStation VR; PlayStation VR2; Meta Quest 2; Meta Quest 3; Microsoft Windows
- Release: August 10, 2021; December 5, 2023 (Final Cut)
- Genres: Action-adventure; Stealth
- Mode: Single-player

Arashi: Castles of Sin is a virtual reality stealth action-adventure game for PlayStation VR on PlayStation 4, developed by Endeavor One and published by Prep Games. A Final Cut version was co-published with Skydance Interactive and released on December 5, 2023, on next-generation virtual reality consoles.

== Gameplay ==
Players control Kenshiro, an elite shinobi and the last surviving son of the noble House Arashi with a wolf companion, Haru, as they take down bandits set within a world in feudal Japan. As a ninja, players have to use stealth elements around its surroundings along take out the bandits using an arsenal of weapons to your disposal.

== Development ==
The game is developed by Seattle-based studio Endeavor One, a virtual reality company who made Halo: Recruit for Windows Mixed Reality and Dome of the Dead, a 2019 4-player cooperative shooter for Vulcan's HoloDome. It was their first game made by a 30-person team of veterans from the Halo and Destiny franchises, powered using Unity 3D, with support from Unity's Seattle office, over the course of the last two years. When developing the game, they had an expert swordsman, Russell McCartney, to provide motion-capture on Kenshiro while Beyond Capture helps provide the motion-capture on Haru with dogs.

== Reception ==
The VR Grid gave it an 8/10 when playing it on the PlayStation 5. Hey Poor Player gave it a positive at 3/5. A review for the Final Cut version gave it a 6/10 on Push Square.

== Final Cut ==
During the Upload VR showcase in June 2023, a final cut version of the game was announced to be arriving on Quest 2 and Quest 3, PlayStation VR2, and PCVR on December 5, 2023, and was co-developed by Skydance Interactive.
