= Todd Stashwick =

American actor (born 1968)

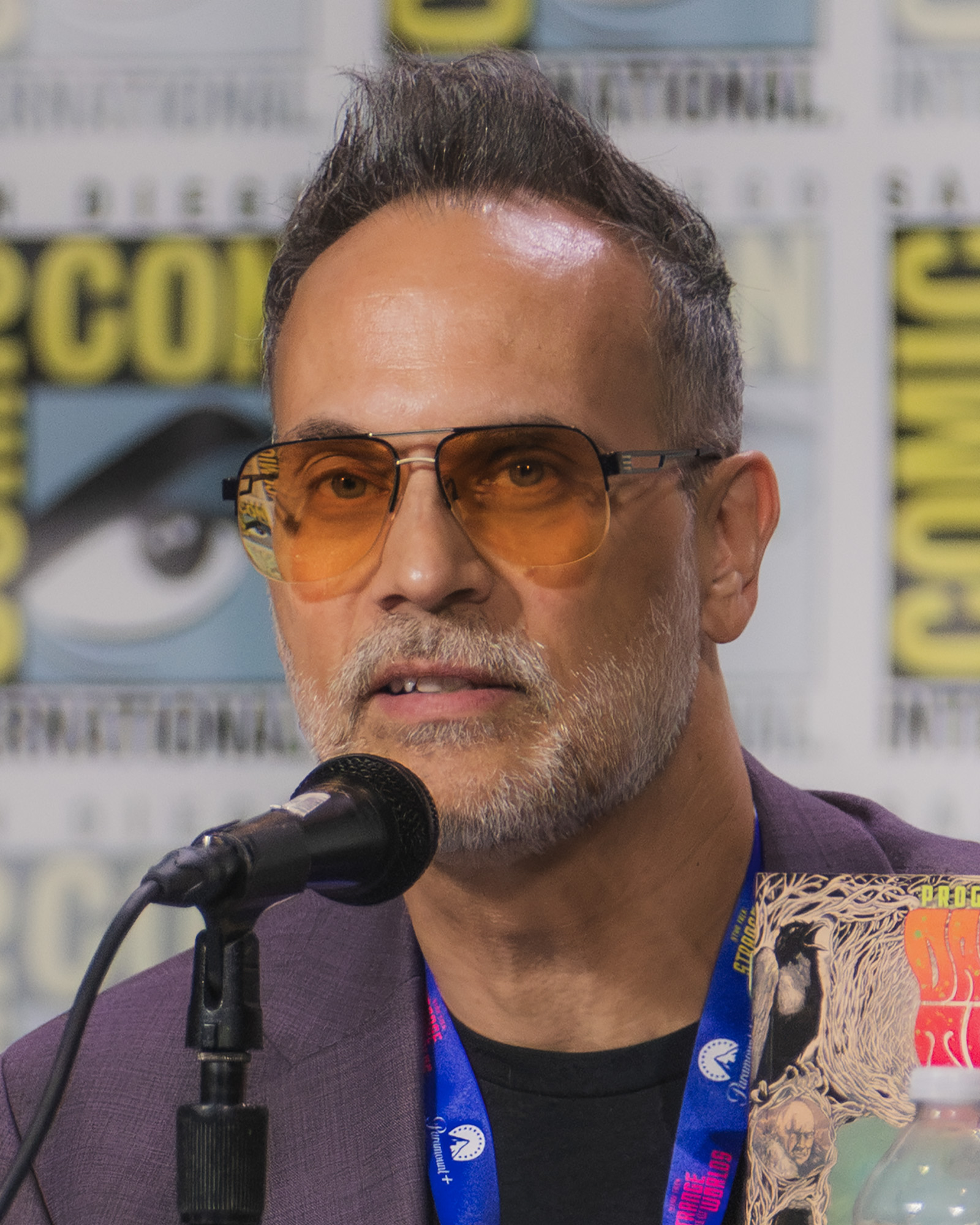
- Stashwick in 2026
- Born: Chicago, Illinois, U.S.
- Occupations: Actor, writer
- Years active: 1997–present
- Children: 2

Todd Stashwick is an American actor. He is known for his roles as Dale Malloy on The Riches (2007–2008), Theodore Deacon on 12 Monkeys (2015–2018) and Dr. Drakken in the Disney Channel film Kim Possible (2019). He also played Captain Liam Shaw in the third season of Star Trek: Picard (2023).

== Early life and career ==
Stashwick was born in Chicago at the Swedish Covenant Hospital, and was raised in the suburbs just outside of the city. As a child, he always loved making people laugh, and he aspired one day to perform at The Second City in Chicago. Soon after graduating from Illinois State University with a degree in theater, he began performing at several local improvisational theaters, and his dream came true when he was hired in 1992 to tour nationally with The Second City. Following productions at The Second City Detroit and The Second City Northwest, he relocated to New York. He auditioned for Saturday Night Live the same year that fellow Second City alumnus David Koechner joined the cast.

Work in film and television drew him to Los Angeles, where he shot several pilots and series including recurring work on the series MDs, American Dreams, Rodney and Still Standing. He had a significant supporting role on The Riches playing Minnie Driver's nefarious cousin until its cancellation in September 2008.

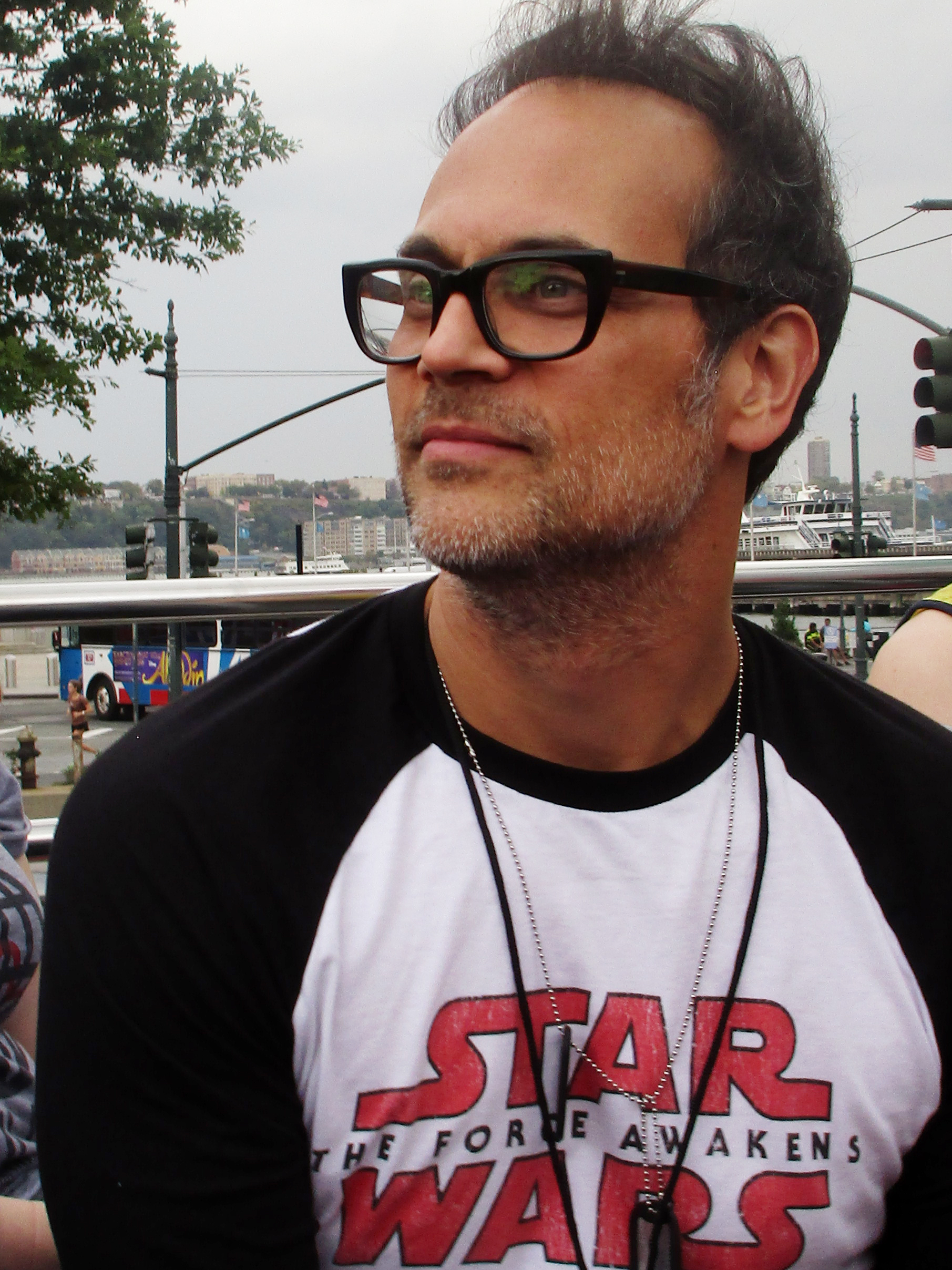
Todd Stashwick – NYCC 2015 Con Man Bus

In May 2018, it was announced he was cast as Dr. Drakken in the Disney Channel film Kim Possible, based on the animated series. The film premiered on February 15, 2019.

In September 2020, Stashwick appeared as a guest on the Studio 60 on the Sunset Strip marathon fundraiser episode of The George Lucas Talk Show.

=== Writing ===
Stashwick is also the co-creator, along with DC and Marvel artist Dennis Calero of the online web comic Devil Inside, which had its launch at the 2010 San Diego Comic-Con. He and Calero met because Dennis had illustrated Todd's character from Heroes into an online comic based on the series. The two decided to collaborate on their own title which is being self-published once a week in traditional serialized strip form on Stashwick's personal website.

Devil Inside tells "the story of Jack Springheel. aka The Devil, who has a crisis of conscience. He blasts out of hell and lands in the Nevada desert. He does not want to go back, he wants to quit. But there are forces conspiring to drag him back to hell. If he doesn't use his mojo he stays off the grid and they can't find him. But he is the Devil after all and old habits die hard, not using his powers proves more difficult than he thought. A man caught between what he is and what he wants to be. He's trying to stay one step ahead of his adversaries."

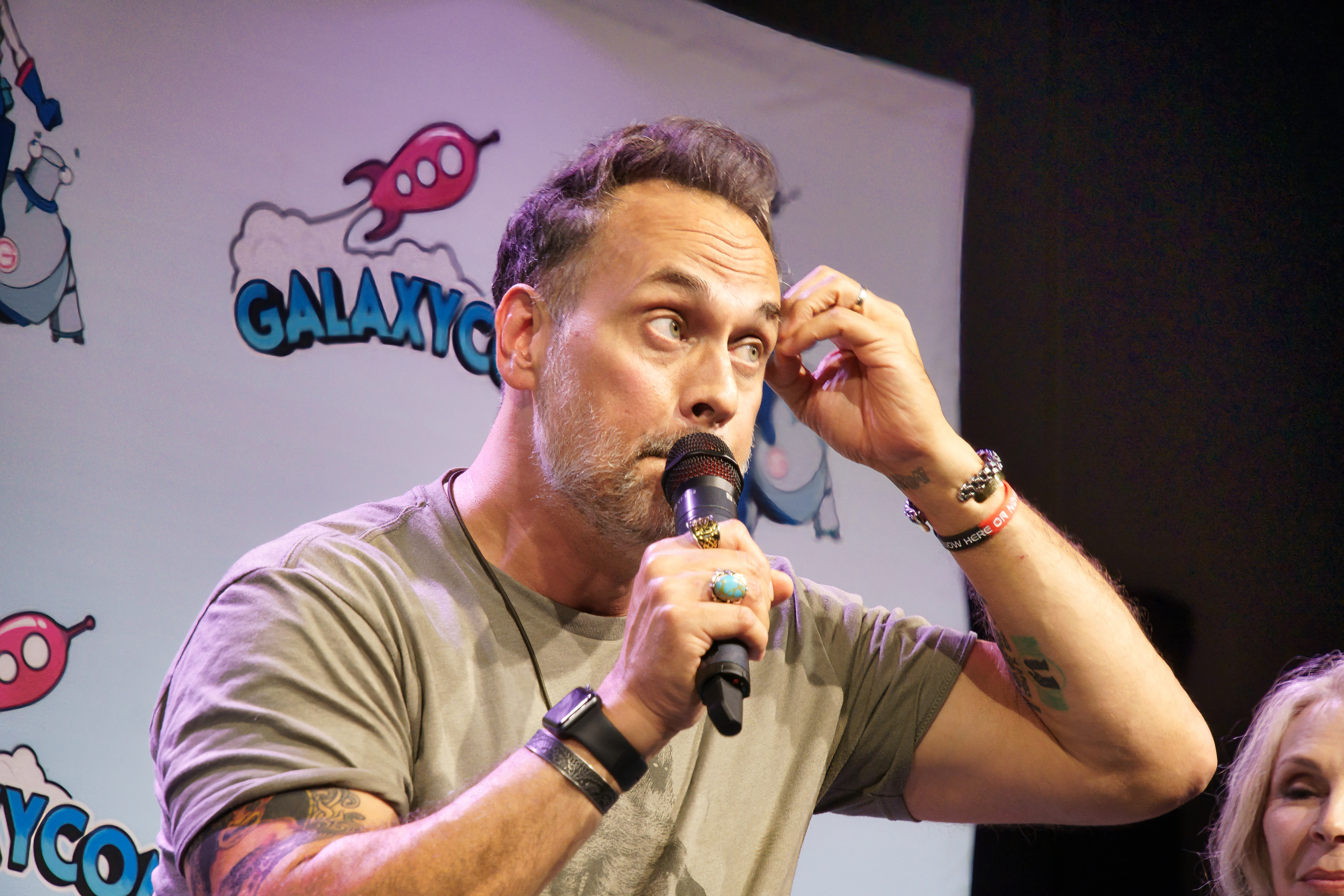
Todd Stashwick at Galaxy Con Raleigh 2023

Stashwick and Calero are in development with the Syfy channel with their pilot Clandestine. The two will develop and write the pilot script for the swashbuckling space adventure drama. They will also serve as co-executive producers. John Shiban will serve as script supervisor.

Stashwick and Amy Hennig co-wrote a video game set in the Star Wars universe for Electronic Arts and Visceral Games. It was later announced that the project was cancelled.

== Filmography ==
=== Film ===
| Year | Title | Role | Notes |
|---|---|---|---|
| 2003 | The Rundown | Quadrant Manager | |
| 2004 | Along Came Polly | Security Officer | |
| 2006 | You, Me and Dupree | Tony | |
| 2007 | Live! | Dave | |
| 2007 | The Air I Breathe | Frank | |
| 2008 | Surfer, Dude | Vic Hayes | |
| 2010 | Friendship! | Darryl | |
| 2011 | Tom and Jerry & The Wizard of Oz | Cowardly Lion (voice) | Direct-to-video |
| 2012 | Grassroots | Nick Ricochet | |
| 2014 | Mockingbird | Tom | |
| 2016 | Tom and Jerry: Back to Oz | Cowardly Lion, Zeke (voices) | Direct-to-video |
| 2020 | The Way Back | Kurt | |
| 2020 | Think Like a Dog | Henry (voice) | |
| 2020 | Love, Weddings & Other Disasters | Zhopa | |
| 2021 | Violet | Rick | |

=== Television ===
| Year | Title | Role | Notes |
|---|---|---|---|
| 1997 | Remember WENN | Link | Episode: "A Star in Stripes Forever" |
| 1998 | Law & Order | Roger Appel | Episode: "Grief" |
| 1998 | Spin City | Television Director | Episode: "Gobble the Wonder Turkey Saves the Day" |
| 1999; 2008 | Law & Order: Special Victims Unit | Ricky Blaine, Matthew Parker | 2 episodes |
| 2000 | Angel | Vocah Demon | Episode: "To Shanshu in L.A." |
| 2000 | Diagnosis: Murder | Peter Warbler | Episode: "Hot House" |
| 2000–2001 | Courage the Cowardly Dog | Additional Voices | 12 episodes |
| 2001 | Titus | Chad | Episode: "Sunday! Sunday! Sunday!" |
| 2001 | Providence | Vic | Episode: "It Was a Dark and Stormy Night" |
| 2001 | Will & Grace | Gabe Robinson | Episode: "Alice Doesn't Lisp Here Anymore" |
| 2001 | Buffy the Vampire Slayer | M'Fashnik Demon | Episode: "Flooded" |
| 2001 | Dark Angel | Sally | Episode: "Boo" |
| 2001 | Dharma & Greg | Gunther | Episode: "Previously on Dharma and Greg" |
| 2002 | CSI: Crime Scene Investigation | Matt | Episode: "Revenge Is Best Served Cold" |
| 2002 | She Spies | Agent Trent Kimbrell / The Ice Man | Episode: "Ice Man" |
| 2002 | MDs | Ribeye | 3 episodes |
| 2003 | Law & Order: Criminal Intent | Dr. Scott Borman | Episode: "Zoonotic" |
| 2003 | The Guardian | Jeb Tobin | 2 episodes |
| 2003 | Malcolm in the Middle | Nate | Episode: "Malcolm's Job" |
| 2004 | Good Morning, Miami | Nick | Episode: "You Bet Your Relationship" |
| 2004 | Monk | Gene Edelson / Winston Brenner | Episode: "Mr. Monk and the Blackout" |
| 2004 | Stuck in the Suburbs | Len | Television film |
| 2004 | Boston Legal | Matthew Calder | Episode: "Head Cases" |
| 2004 | Star Trek: Enterprise | Talok | Episode: "Kir'Shara" |
| 2004 | The Drew Carey Show | Tyler | Episode: "Still Life with Freeloader" |
| 2004; 2011 | CSI: Miami | Steve Davis, Fred Massey | 2 episodes |
| 2005 | Rodney | Kirk | 2 episodes |
| 2005 | CSI: NY | Ira Feinstein | Episode: "Grand Murder at Central Station" |
| 2005 | Out of Practice | Frankie | Episode: "Losing Patients" |
| 2005–2006 | Still Standing | Kyle Polsky | 4 episodes |
| 2005; 2007 | Weeds | Cash the Security Guard | 2 episodes |
| 2006 | Crossing Jordan | Bank Manager Raleigh | Episode: "Loves Me Not" |
| 2006 | Four Kings | Iguana Guy | Episode: "Night of the Iguana" |
| 2006 | How I Met Your Mother | Steve | Episode: "Atlantic City" |
| 2006 | Studio 60 on the Sunset Strip | Bill | Episode: "B-12" |
| 2006–2007 | The War at Home | Jeff | 4 episodes |
| 2007 | Reba | Bartender | Episode: "The Housewarming" |
| 2007–2008 | The Riches | Dale Malloy | 20 episodes |
| 2007; 2011 | Burn Notice | Carmelo Dante | 2 episodes |
| 2008 | The Game | Dean Bristol | Episode: "Before the Parade Passes By" |
| 2008 | The Middleman | Mr. White | Episode: "The Flying Fish Zombification" |
| 2008 | Psych | Frankjim Ogletree | Episode: "Ghosts" |
| 2008 | Life | James Brenford | Episode: "The Business of Miracles" |
| 2008 | Supernatural | Dracula | Episode: "Monster Movie" |
| 2008 | Ghost Whisperer | Alan Walters | Episode: "Heart & Soul" |
| 2008 | Terminator: The Sarah Connor Chronicles | Myron Stark / T-888 | Episode: "Self Made Man" |
| 2009 | The Mentalist | Jared Renfrew | Episode: "Red John's Friends" |
| 2009 | Kath & Kim | Jaclson James | Episode: "Idols" |
| 2009 | Saving Grace | Teddy Kornblum | Episode: "Popcorn" |
| 2009 | Curb Your Enthusiasm | Sandy Goodman | 2 episodes |
| 2009 | Lie to Me | Hugh Ellis | Episode: "Fold Equity" |
| 2009–2010 | Heroes | Eli | 6 episodes |
| 2010 | The Good Guys | Kasson | Episode: "Vacation" |
| 2010 | Childrens Hospital | Officer | Episode: "You Know No One Can Hear You, Right?" |
| 2010 | $#*! My Dad Says | Dickey Todd | 2 episodes |
| 2010–2011 | Detroit 1-8-7 | Henry Malloy | 2 episodes |
| 2010–2012; 2025 | Phineas and Ferb | Jack Johnson, Additional Voices | 8 episodes |
| 2011 | Private Practice | Brett Loveman | Episode: "Home Again" |
| 2011 | Better with You | Miles | 2 episodes |
| 2011 | The Glades | Jared Nolan | Episode: "Old Ghosts" |
| 2011 | Men of a Certain Age | Kevin Scarpulla | 4 episodes |
| 2011 | Phineas and Ferb the Movie: Across the 2nd Dimension | Jack Johnson | Television film |
| 2011 | How to Be a Gentleman | Donny | Episode: "Pilot" |
| 2011 | Supah Ninjas | Eternum | Episode: "Eternum" |
| 2012 | Leverage | Tommy Madsen | Episode: "The Gold Job" |
| 2012 | Justified | Ash Murphy | 4 episodes |
| 2012 | Franklin & Bash | Samuel Jeffers | Episode: "Last Dance" |
| 2012 | Hawaii Five-0 | Gil Scates | Episode: "Lana I Ka Moana" |
| 2012 | Revolution | Drexel | Episode: "Sex and Drugs" |
| 2012–2013 | The Exes | Grant | 2 episodes |
| 2013 | Grey's Anatomy | Mr. Kramer | Episode: "Idle Hands" |
| 2013 | Warehouse 13 | DA Hofgren | Episode: "Instinct" |
| 2013 | Criminal Minds | Eddie Lee Wilcox | Episode: "Route 66" |
| 2013–2014 | The Originals | Father Kieran O'Connell | 12 episodes |
| 2014–2015 | Teen Wolf | Henry Tate | 3 episodes |
| 2014–2015 | Gotham | Richard Sionis / The Mask | 2 episodes |
| 2015 | Complications | Detective Hawthorne | Episode: "Critical Condition" |
| 2015 | Con Man | Waiter | Episode: "Doll Faced" |
| 2015–2018 | 12 Monkeys | Deacon | 35 episodes |
| 2016 | The Real O'Neals | Dwayne | Episode: "The Real Fit" |
| 2018 | Strange Angel | Marvel Parsons | 2 episodes |
| 2019 | Kim Possible | Dr. Drakken | Television film |
| 2019 | Mayans M.C. | Pollen | 2 episodes |
| 2019 | American Horror Story: 1984 | Blake | Episode: "Mr. Jingles" |
| 2019–2020 | S.W.A.T. | Teague Nolan | 3 episodes |
| 2020 | L.A.'s Finest | Wayland James | Episode: "Rafferty and the Gold Dust Twins" |
| 2021 | 9-1-1: Lone Star | Dennis Raymond | 2 episodes |
| 2023 | Star Trek: Picard | Captain Liam Shaw | 10 episodes |
| 2023 | The Last Thing He Told Me | Avett Thompson | 3 episodes |
| 2026 | VisionQuest | Paul Denning / Paladin | 7 episodes |

=== Video games ===
| Year | Title | Role | Notes |
|---|---|---|---|
| 2014 | Uncharted 4 | Sam Drake | Replaced by Troy Baker |
| 2023 | Forspoken | —N/a | Writer |
| TBA | Marvel 1943: Rise of Hydra | —N/a | Writer |

=== Podcast ===
| Year | Title | Role | Notes |
|---|---|---|---|
| 2023 | Who is No/One? | Ben Kern | |

== Awards and nominations ==
| Year | Award | Category | Nominated work | Result | Ref. |
|---|---|---|---|---|---|
| 2024 | Saturn Awards | Best Supporting Actor in a Television Series | Star Trek: Picard | Nominated | |
