= The Walking Dead: Saints & Sinners – Chapter 2: Retribution =

2022 video game

- Developers: Skydance Interactive; Skybound Entertainment
- Publisher: Skydance Interactive
- Series: The Walking Dead
- Engine: Unreal Engine 4
- Platforms: Meta Quest 2; PICO 4; PlayStation VR2; Microsoft Windows
- Release: Meta Quest 2 December 1, 2022; PICO 4 December 23, 2022; PSVR2; March 21, 2023; PC; March 21, 2023
- Genres: First-person shooter survival horror
- Mode: Single-player

The Walking Dead: Saints & Sinners – Chapter 2: Retribution is a virtual reality first-person shooter survival horror game for SteamVR, PlayStation VR, PlayStation VR2 and Meta Quest 2. Developed by Skydance Interactive in partnership with Skybound Entertainment, it is a sequel to The Walking Dead: Saints & Sinners and based on the comic book series The Walking Dead by Robert Kirkman. The game was released in December 2022 for the Meta Quest 2 and PICO 4, and released for PlayStation VR2 and Steam in March 2023.

== Gameplay ==
Like the first game, the player can kill walkers by "braining" them: stabbing them through the skull, puncturing the brain. The player is able to scale buildings to ambush enemies and attack from a distance with throwing weapons, bows, and long-range firearms. Physics-based combat control how melee weapons are used. Players can explore during night time, though walkers will be attracted to the player's flashlight. Additionally, the game introduces new weapons and items such as a chainsaw and a sawed-off shotgun for players to defeat enemies. Laser sights can be attached to some firearms to increase shooting accuracy.

== Plot ==
Three months after the events of the first game, The Tourist aids a group of survivors in obtaining the blueprints to the Hotel E'Claire. The Tourist is knocked unconscious during the mission, and after meets up in a room with Father Carter, whom the Tourist gives the blueprints.

The Tourist returns home, after reminiscing about the events that transpire in between games. During that time, a disaster occurred in Old Town, the Reclaimed were killed off, and a killer known as The Axeman has killed Tower residents across the French Quarter.

The Tourist meets with The Pawn King, a man named Sonny, who tells him that he will facilitate a trade network with the Tourist, if he can retrieve a battery from an old recording studio. Upon retrieving the battery, the Tourist is ambushed by the Axeman; a heavily armed man, who reveals himself to be May Benoit's husband, Gerik, who explains that the Tourist (player) killed his wife, May Benoit, and seeks to avenge her. After learning that Sonny organized the meeting, Gerik presses a button which breaks the wall behind them, letting a crowd of walkers flood in.

The Tourist is contacted by a group called The Dissidents, who seek to dismantle the Tower, and overthrow Mama, the Tower's leader. After helping the Dissidents get the supplies they need, and aiding other allies, the Tourist and the Dissidents travel to the Tower, where they learn that Mama plans to make the bells ring all across New Orleans, in an attempt to destroy the Exiles once and for all. Shortly after, the Tourist and the Dissidents are ambushed outside of the Tower, during which the Dissidents are killed.

The Tourist travels through the sewers of New Orleans to find Gerik's hideout, where both the Tourist and Gerik are attacked by the Tower. Pursuing Gerik further, the Tourist subdues him, at which point he can either kill him or spare him. Leaving Gerik’s hideout, the Tourist prepares for a final assault on the Tower.

Upon hearing the bells ring throughout the city, the Tourist and his allies attack the Tower. The Tourist confronts Mama, who says that she only ever wanted what was best for the city, believing that killing the Exiles will provide a fresh start. She offers the Tourist a choice, which results in one of two endings. The Tourist can either switch off the bells, and stop the chaos, or leave them on, and allow Mama to continue her destruction. If the Tourist turns the bells off, Mama laments this decision. If the bells are left on, the Tourist is berated by the voice of Henri. Either way, Mama ends the confrontation by throwing herself from the top of Tower, ending her reign.

== Development ==
The game was announced in January 2022 by Skydance Interactive. It was released on Meta Quest 2 by December 1, 2022. During the UploadVR Showcase in 2022, new weapons were showcased along with an announcement that the game will be released on PICO and Windows.

== Reception ==
Reception

Aggregate score
| Aggregator | Score |
|---|---|
| Metacritic | 72/100 |

Review scores
| Publication | Score |
|---|---|
| IGN | 6/10 (MQ2); 7/10 (PSVR2) |
| Push Square | 8/10 |

According to review aggregator website Metacritic, the PlayStation 5 version of the game received "mixed or average" reviews upon release.

IGN praised the visual experience, but criticized the buggy state of the game, writing, "About five hours into my PS VR2 playthrough, a quest completely stopped updating with new progress, forcing me to scrap my save altogether and start anew". Christian Kobza from Push Square enjoyed the new gameplay additions and the game's tense atmosphere, though he felt that the game was more similar to a video game expansion than a sequel. While he liked Axeman as the game's antagonist, he was disappointed by the game's mission design and described the story as "trivial" and "sparse".
