= Archangel (2017 video game) =

2017 video game by Skydance Interactive

- Developer: Skydance Interactive
- Publisher: Skydance Interactive
- Engine: Unreal Engine 4
- Platforms: Oculus Rift; Microsoft Windows; PlayStation VR
- Release: PlayStation VR; July 18, 2017; Oculus Rift, PC; August 2, 2017
- Genre: First-person shooter
- Mode: Single-player

Archangel is a virtual reality first-person shooter game for Windows, PlayStation 4, and Oculus Quest, developed and published by Skydance Interactive. A free update titled Archangel: Hellfire was released in 2018.

== Gameplay ==
Gameplay screenshot

The player plays as an Archangel test pilot Gabriel or Gabby Walker fighting HUMNX. Players control a giant mech known as the Archangel with shields, power ups, and weapons available. Using both twin controllers or a gamepad control, players can fire an array of weapons on each mech arm, or smash enemy units with fists. They would also have to upgrade them by choice, meaning they have to choose one of the weapons upgraded to the mech carefully.

== Plot ==
At the end of the 21st century, the world is in ruins as a consequence of disastrous ecological disaster. In control of the world is HUMNX, a corporation born out of a desire to heal the world, no matter the human cost. Opportunistic and driven by cold logic, it is trying to rebuild the world under its vision. Opposing it are the remnants of the United States Armed Forces, now the self-proclaimed United States Free Forces (USFF), or ‘The Free’. To resolve this, The Free created an experimental weapon called The Archangel, to take freedom back for humanity from HUMNX.

== Development ==
In May 2016, Skydance launched the Skydance Games division following the acquisition of The Workshop Entertainment and announced in January 2017 for a new VR story-driven game titled Archangel which later showcased at E3 2017.

== Reception ==
Reception

Aggregate score
Aggregator	Score
Metacritic	PS4: 69

The game has received "mixed or average" reviews from critics according to review aggregator Metacritic. UploadVR gave the game an 8 out of 10.
