= Marvel 1943: Rise of Hydra =

Upcoming video game

- Developer: Paramount Games Studio
- Publisher: Plaion
- Producers: Amy Hennig; Julian Beak
- Writers: Amy Hennig; Marc Bernardin; Todd Stashwick
- Composer: Stephen Barton
- Engine: Unreal Engine 5
- Release: 2027
- Genre: Action-adventure
- Mode: Single-player

Marvel 1943: Rise of Hydra is an upcoming action-adventure game developed by Paramount Games Studio and published by Plaion. Inspired by the 2010 Marvel Comics limited series Captain America/Black Panther: Flags of Our Fathers, and set in Occupied Paris during World War II, it involves American super soldier Steve Rogers (Captain America) forming an uneasy alliance with Azzuri (Black Panther), the king of Wakanda, as they attempt to prevent the rise of the terrorist organization Hydra.

Marvel 1943: Rise of Hydra was jointly announced by Paramount and Marvel Games in October 2021 as the first project to be produced from the former studio, alongside the involvement of studio heads Amy Hennig and Julian Beak as producers, with television and comics writer Marc Bernardin confirmed as writing the game alongside Hennig the following month. It serves as the first Marvel-related project to be distributed by Paramount since 2011's Captain America: The First Avenger.

== Gameplay ==
The game will be an action-adventure video game where players will control an ensemble of four characters. In addition to the main protagonists Steve Rogers / Captain America and Azzuri / Black Panther, Howling Commandos member Gabriel Jones and Nanali, the leader of the Wakandan Spy Network, will be playable.

== Development ==
In November 2019, Skydance Media asked video game director and writer Amy Hennig to establish a game division within the company. In October 2021, the division, as Skydance New Media, announced that the studio's first major project would be "a narrative-driven, blockbuster action-adventure game" developed in collaboration with Marvel Games, and featuring an original story. The following month, Marvel Comics writer and television producer Marc Bernardin revealed that he was involved as a writer, confirming that he had "spent the better part of a year in the story mines" creating the narrative.

The game was teased during the D23 Expo showcase on September 9, 2022, revealing the game's ensemble cast and antagonist. In March 2024, Skydance and Marvel revealed the game's full title as Marvel 1943: Rise of Hydra during Game Developers Conference (GDC) 2024, also presenting a story trailer that demonstrated the game's use of Unreal Engine 5 and its character animations. The cast was unveiled by Marvel, confirming that Khary Payton and Drew Moerlein would lead the ensemble as Azzuri and Steve Rogers respectively, alongside Marque Richardson as Gabriel Jones and Megalyn Echikunwoke as Nanali. Marvel announced that Joel Johnstone would portray Howard Stark, an ally of Captain America and a tech genius who is also the future father of Tony Stark, while Lyne Renée would appear as Julie, an original character created for the game. Stephen Barton was revealed as the game's composer. Actress Janina Gavankar is confirmed to have a role.

On July 29, 2024, Skydance New Media partnered with Plaion to publish Marvel 1943: Rise of Hydra.

== Release ==
Marvel 1943: Rise of Hydra was originally slated for a holiday 2025 release, but then delayed to "early 2026". In November 2025, Skydance announced the game would be further delayed "beyond early 2026", but with no specific release date given. In June 2026, it was announced that the game would not be released before 2027.
