= Niko and the Sword of Light =

Television series

- Created by: Jim Bryson
- Developed by: Rob Hoegee
- Voices of: Andre Robinson; Kari Wahlgren; Tom Kenny; Steve Blum; Dee Bradley Baker; Jim Cummings; Kevin Michael Richardson
- Composer: Stephen Barton
- Country of origin: United States
- No. of episodes: 23 (+ 1 pilot)

Production
- Executive producers: Bobby Chiu; Kei Acedera; Jim Bryson; Adam Jeffcoat; Rob Hoegee; Chris Prynoski; Shannon Barrett Prynoski
- Producer: Ben Kalina
- Editor: Barry J. Kelly
- Running time: 24 minutes
- Production companies: Amazon Studios; Titmouse, Inc.

Original release
- Network: Amazon Prime Video
- Release: July 20, 2017 – September 6, 2019

Niko and the Sword of Light is an American flash animated television series co-produced by Amazon Studios and Titmouse, Inc. The series is based on an animated comic book of the same name and debuted on Amazon Prime Video as a pilot that premiered January 15, 2015. It was later picked up as a full series.

On August 4, 2017, it was announced that the series was renewed for a second and final season. The first half of season 2 premiered on December 27, 2018. The series concluded on September 6, 2019.

== Synopsis ==
The series is centered around a 10-year-old human boy named Niko, who is one of the last of his kind in a strange world as he goes on an adventure to bring light back to his land.

== Cast ==
- Felix Avitia as Niko (pilot)
- Andre Robinson as Niko (series) - Niko is the latest in a line of human Champions who have tried and failed to defeat the evil sorcerer Nar Est and destroy the Darkness, and is physically the youngest as his chrysalis was opened too soon by accident. He is an excitable young boy with a heroic spirit, a pure heart, and never shies from a challenge. Wielding the Sword of Light, Niko can defeat darkness-corrupted creatures and purify them, restoring them to their true forms.
- Kari Wahlgren as Lyra - Lyra is the Princess of her human kingdom, Carondole, which has been imprisoned within a sphere where time has stopped, and she has literally been 14 years old for 768 years. It is her duty to mentor the Champions and guide them in the form of a spirit to defeat Nar Est, but every time the Champions have fallen. When she first meets Niko, her latest (and last) Champion, she tries to lead him somewhere safe to wait a few years for him to grow older, only for circumstances to force her to appear physically in the outside world in her mission to help Niko save them all. After Nar Est is a long last defeated, Lyra finally assumes the throne as Queen.
- Jim Cummings as the Narrator, the Darkness, the Mugwump.
- Dee Bradley Baker as Flicker - Flicker is a Buttermonk that was corrupted by Darkness and turned into a monster called Xerxes. He chased after Mandok to eat him and this resulted in freeing Niko from his chrysalis before his time. Flicker is the first darkened creature Niko purifies and returns to normal, and Flicker becomes a loyal and beloved companion of Niko and his friends. At various points of their journey, Flicker undergoes a metamorphosis via cocooning, growing bigger and larger, gaining the power to shoot lasers from his eyes, until he is fully grown, appearing like a bug/beast/dragon-like creature and becomes a means of transportation for his friends. After getting injured, Flicker again undergoes a cocooning and reverts to his original tiny form. Besides flying and his laser-vision, Flicker has the ability to project others' memories from his eyes like a movie projector.
- Steve Blum as Nar Est, Rasper - Nar Est is an evil human sorcerer who overthrew his king and unleashed a terrible Darkness upon the world to conquer it. He was prevented however from total domination by the Shard of Light from the Crystal he corrupted, which is the source of his power. He uses his evil magic to corrupt creatures and places, turning them into horrible monsters and places fraught with danger. His crow-like bird sidekick, Rasper, constantly pecks at the sphere that contains the shrunken kingdom of Corandale. It is revealed that Nar Est himself is a (unknowing) pawn of the Darkness itself.
- Corey Burton as Jackal - Jackal is a mysterious Howlen, a humanoid canine, the group meets and befriends after a harrowing monster attack, although they don't know his name and he speaks a language only Mandok can understand. At first, he seemed a friendly, dependable ally, but revealed his true allegiances after leading them into the Thorns of Tribulation as an agent for Nar Est and that he can speak their language perfectly before he tries to steal Niko's Sword of Light.
- Tom Kenny as Mandok - Mandok is a little rodent-like Munkchip who is cowardly, bumbling, but ultimately loyal and occasionally wise. He is the one who accidentally caused Niko to awaken too soon, and winds up traveling with him and Lyra in their adventure to defeat the Darkness. His knowledge of the world comes in handy due to being up to date on certain locations.
- Kevin Michael Richardson as Beady Brothers.
- Hynden Walch as Wispy - A wisp of the Darkness that survived and escaped being destroyed by the Sword of Light. It helped Nar Est escape his imprisonment, telling him to find the Amulet of Power to help the Darkness return and conquer the world yet again.

== Episodes ==
=== Pilot (2015) ===
No. overall	No. in season	Title	Directed by	Written by	Storyboard by	Original release date	Prod. code
0	0	"From the Desert of Despair into the Swamp of Sorrow! (Niko And The Sword Of Light Pilot)"	Sung Jin Ahn	Rob Hoegee	Sung Jin Ahn, David Woo, Ben Juwono & Donna Lee	January 15, 2015	NSWL100

=== Chapter 1: The Cursed Volcano (2017) ===
No. overall	No. in season	Title	Directed by	Written by	Storyboard by	Original release date	Prod. code
1	1	"From the Temple of Champions to the Bridge of Doom (A Champion Has Awoken)"	Sung Jin Ahn	Jim Krieg, Rob Hoegee & Matt Wayne	Sung Jin Ahn, Kim Arndt & Alexandria Kwan	July 20, 2017	NSWL101
2	2	"From the Sky Maze of Anguish to the Swamp of Sorrow (Let the Journey Begin)"	Sung Jin Ahn	Ernie Altbacker & Matt Wayne	Sung Jin Ahn, Kim Arndt & Alexandria Kwan	July 20, 2017	NSWL102
3	3	"From the Swamp of Sorrow to the Hills of Humiliation (Niko and the Trail of Wisdom)"	Michael Moloney	May Chan	Paul Cohen, Gabriel Lee, Michael Moloney & Bob Suarez	July 20, 2017	NSWL103
4	4	"From the Phantom Woods to the Mountains of Misery (Niko and the Memories of Darkness)"	Sung Jin Ahn	Geoffrey Thorne	Kim Arndt & Alexandria Kwan	July 20, 2017	NSWL104
5	5	"From the Sea of Suffering to the Faraway Shore (The Search for the Sea Pearl)"	Michael Moloney	Ernie Altbacker	Paul Cohen, Gabriel Lee & Bob Suarez	July 20, 2017	NSWL105
6	6	"From the Tumbledowns to the Gap of Gloom (Meet the Tumblebees & A Mysterious Sidekick)"	Sung Jin Ahn	Rob Hoegee	Kim Arndt, Alexandria Kwan, Luke Weber & Chris Ybarra	July 20, 2017	NSWL106
7	7	"From the Endless Expanse to the Thorns of Tribulation (Niko and the Spy of Nar Est)"	Michael Moloney	Patrick Rieger	Paul Cohen, Gabriel Lee & Bob Suarez	July 20, 2017	NSWL107
8	8	"From the Cliffs of Catastrophe to the Pools of Destiny (Niko Meets the Original Champion)"	Sung Jin Ahn	Matt Wayne	Kim Arndt, Alexandria Kwan & Luke Weber	July 20, 2017	NSWL108
9	9	"From the Shattering Springs to the Clouds of Chaos (Niko and the Pirates of the Sky)"	Michael Moloney	Geoffrey Thorne	Paul Cohen, Gabriel Lee, Bob Suarez & Chris Ybarra	July 20, 2017	NSWL109
10	10	"From the Peaks of Peril to the Mounds of Mania (Niko VS. Jackal: The Slope Race)"	Sung Jin Ahn	Jim Krieg, Rob Hoegee & Matt Wayne	Kim Arndt, Diana Huh, Alexandria Kwan, Fabien Tong & Luke Weber	July 20, 2017	NSWL110
11	11	"From the Tunnels of Terror to the Den of Doom (Niko and the Cure for Lyra)"	Michael Moloney	Len Uhley	Paul Cohen, Gabriel Lee & Bob Suarez	July 20, 2017	NSWL111
12	12	"From the Cursed Volcano to the End of Hope (Niko's Final Battle: Part 1: The Fallen Champion)"	Sung Jin Ahn	Ernie Altbacker & Matt Wayne	Kim Arndt, Alexandria Kwan & Luke Weber	July 20, 2017	NSWL112
13	13	"From the Depths of Despair... (Niko's Final Battle: Part 2: Darkness Be Gone)"	Michael Moloney	Rob Hoegee & Matt Wayne	Phil Allora, Gabriel Lee, Kim Arndt, Fabien Tong, Paul Cohen, Bob Suarez & Chris Ybarra	July 20, 2017	NSWL113

=== Chapter 2: The Amulet of Power (2018–19) ===
No. overall	No. in season	Title	Directed by	Written by	Storyboard by	Original release date	Prod. code
14	1	"A Day in Carondolet (Welcome to Carondolet)"	Sung Jin Ahn	Matt Wayne	Aaron Brewer, Brittany McCarthy & Mitch Schauer	December 27, 2018	NSWL201
15	2	"A Night in Carondolet (A New Mission Arises)"	Sung Jin Ahn	Patrick Rieger	Paul Cohen, Alexandria Kwan, Gabe Lee, Kevin Reed, Zach Shore & Fabien Tong	December 27, 2018	NSWL202
16	3	"The Forest of Fangs (The New Adventure Begins)"	Sung Jin Ahn	Ernie Altbacker	Aaron Brewer, Brittany McCarthy, Doug Olsen & Mitch Schauer	December 27, 2018	NSWL203
17	4	"Sky Whale City (Niko and the Search for the 1st Piece)"	Sung Jin Ahn	Shaene Siders	Alexandria Kwan, Gabriel Lee, Brandon McKinney & Kevin Reed	December 27, 2018	NSWL204
18	5	"The Thorn of Contention (Niko and the Search for the 2nd Piece)"	Sung Jin Ahn	Ernie Altbacker	Aaron Brewer, Nathan Jones, Brittany McCarthy, Doug Olsen, Kevin Reed & Zach Shore	December 27, 2018	NSWL205
19	6	"The Caterpillar Train (Niko's Dark Vision)"	Sung Jin Ahn	Matt Wayne	Nathan Jones, Alexandria Kwan, Gabe Lee & Kevin Reed	September 6, 2019	NSWL206
20	7	"The Vast Sea (The 3rd Piece Journey to the Sea)"	Sung Jin Ahn	Candie Langdale & Patrick Rieger	Brandon McKinney, Doug Olsen & Luke Weber	September 6, 2019	NSWL207
21	8	"The Automatron (Niko and the Bowel That Talks)"	Sung Jin Ahn	Shaene Siders	Paul Cohen, Alexandria Kwan, Nathan Jones, Gabriel Lee, Doug Olsen, Fabien Tong & Chris Ybarra	September 6, 2019	NSWL208
22	9	"The Forgotten Fortress (Niko's Journey to the Amulet Part 1: The Last Hope)"	Sung Jin Ahn	Rob Hoegee	Aaron Brewer, Brittany McCarthy, Brandon McKinney & Zachary Shore	September 6, 2019	NSWL209
23	10	"The Balance of Power (Niko's Journey to the Amulet Part 2: The Battle for Life)"	Sung Jin Ahn	Patrick Rieger	Alexandria Kwan, Gabriel Lee, Brandon McKinney, Kevin Reed & Luke Weber	September 6, 2019	NSWL210

== Awards and nominations ==
Year	Award	Category	Nominee	Result	Ref.
2016	Daytime Emmy Awards	Outstanding Children's Animated Program	Kei Acedera, Jim Bryson, Bobby Chiu, Rob Hoegee, Adam Jeffcoat, Chris Prynoski, Shannon Prynoski and )Ben Kalina (for "From the Desert of Despair Into the Swamp of Sorrow!")	Won	
2018	Annie Awards	Best Animated Television/Broadcast Production For Children	Niko and the Sword of Light	Nominated	
2018	Daytime Emmy Awards	Outstanding Directing in an Animated Program	Sung Jin Ahn, Michael Moloney and Andrea Romano	Nominated	
2020	Annie Awards	Best Animated Television/Broadcast Production For Children	Niko and the Sword of Light	Nominated	
2020	Daytime Emmy Awards	Outstanding Children's Animated Series	Niko and the Sword of Light	Nominated	
