= Drums Rock =

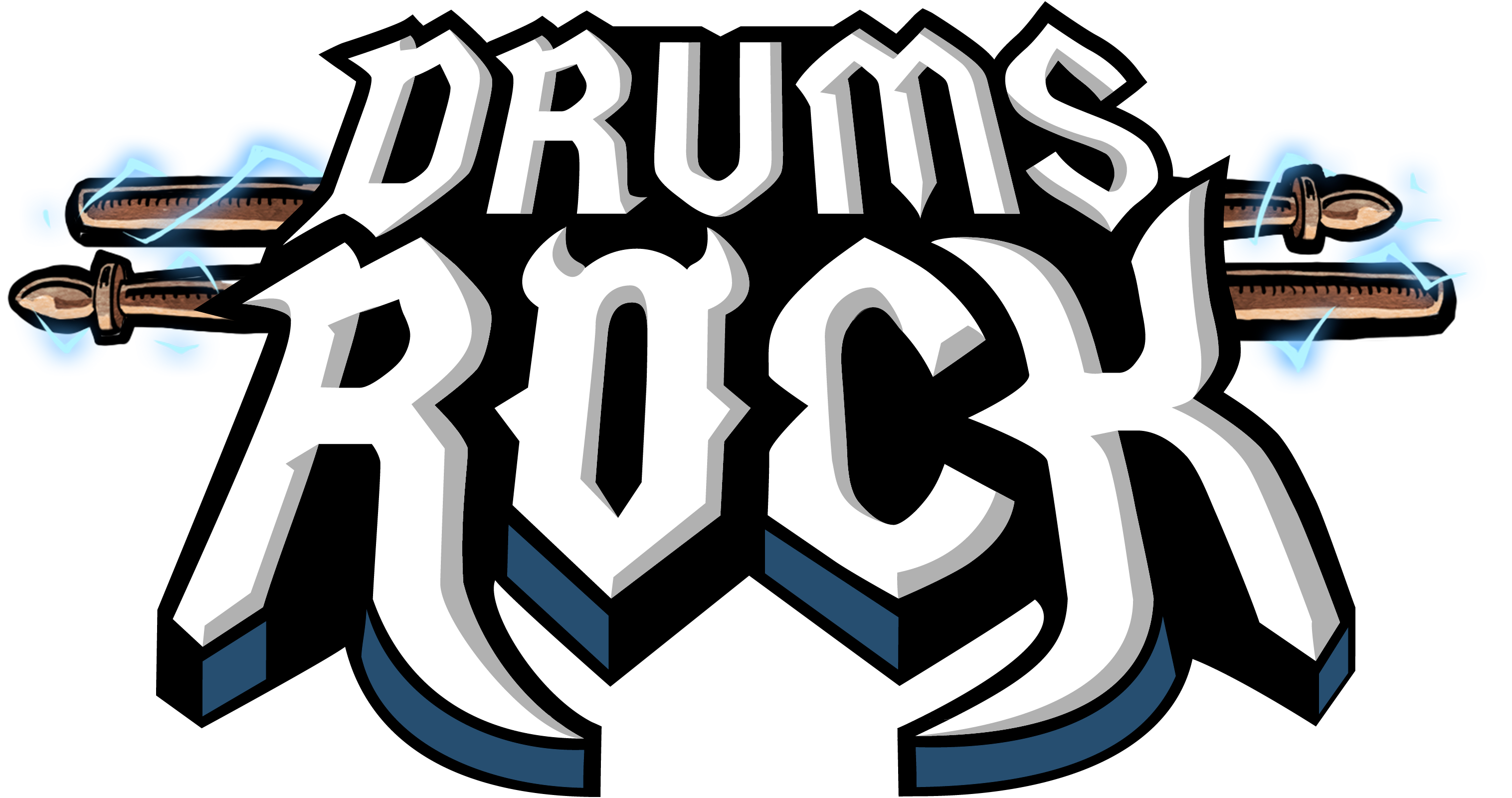
- Developer: Garage 51
- Publisher: Garage 51
- Platforms: Oculus Quest, Meta Quest 2, Meta Quest 3, Meta Quest Pro, Microsoft Windows, PlayStation 5, PlayStation VR2
- Release: Feb 17, 2022
- Genre: Rhythm
- Mode: Single-player

Drums Rock is an indie virtual reality rhythm game developed and published by Garage 51. Heavily inspired by Guitar Hero, in this game you play a drum kit in VR, hitting drums and cymbals with virtual sticks using your controllers.

The game was released in February 17th, 2022 for the Meta Quest platform, and one year after on PlayStation VR2 and PCVR via Steam. It was one of PSVR2 launch titles.

== Gameplay ==
Screenshot of the game, showing the drumkit, the virtual drum sticks and one monster note

The game features a drum kit with four drums and two cymbals. The notes are depicted as flying dragons towards the player. The Campaign mode, with around five hours of gameplay, initially featured a total of 25 songs, being 9 known rock and heavy metal songs (covers from bands such as Evanescence, Joan Jett and the Blackhearts and Ram Jam) and 16 original songs, split in four different worlds with demon bosses to beat. You progress on the game by completing challenges on each songs, which give you up to three stars depending on the specific tasks required. The drum sticks can be thrown upwards for extra points, and specifically on the PSVR2, as it supports foveated rendering and thus can track the players' eyes, there's also a multiplier bonus for "showing off" by playing with your eyes closed.

Other than the campaign, there's also a Challenge mode, in which players can play songs they already unlocked in the Campaign and compare their scores with other players.

Over the years, new content was added to the game, including licensed songs added on the base game for free, as well as several DLCs.

On their Discord server, devs announced that the next DLC to be released later in 2026 will be with Slipknot songs.

The game also supports playing custom songs, that could be added by creating a drum profile to it.

== Songs list ==
=== Base game ===
==== Covers ====
- I Love Rock'n Roll - As Made famous By Joan Jett & The Blackhearts
- Black Betty - As Made famous By Ram Jam
- Bring Me To Life - As Made famous By Evanescence

==== Licensed songs ====
- Blind and Frozen - Beast In Black
- Mirror Mirror - Blind Guardian
- Drink - Alestorm
- Runnin' Wild - Airborne
- You Wanna Do It Too - Violet Road
- Ruscky Bruski - Professor Plumb
- Red Devil - John Verity
- Pleiades - Professor Plumb
- Survivor - Cabin Boy Jumped Ship
- Last Line Of Defense - December Screams Ember
- Fueron Pocos - Sons Of Aguirre & Scila
- Kneon Knightmare - Until You Fall
- Prohibidos y cubiertos de polvo - Blasphemous
- Demeo Main Theme - Demeo
- Golden - Cabin Boy Jumped Ship
- Enemy - December Screams Ember
- Times Lost - December Screams Ember

==== Original Soundtrack ====
- Demon's March
- Demon Blade
- Angels Charm
- Burning Wheels
- They Are Calling Me
- Shining Sun
- Her Voice
- Your Lily
- Obey
- Fearless Honey Badger
- Rule The Night
- Here's The Day
- Broken
- The Reaper's
- Stone Virgins
- Ode To Joy
- Bella Ciao

=== DLCs ===
==== Undertale ====
Musics from the game Undertale.

- MEGALOVANIA - Toby Fox
- Hopes And Dreams - Toby Fox

==== Legendary Mix Vol. 1 ====
- You're Gonna Go Far, Kid - The Offspring
- In the meantime - Spacehog
- My Own Worst Enemy - Lit
- Shine - Collective Soul

==== Simple Plan Music Pack ====
Music from the canadian rock band Simple Plan.

- Welcome to My Life
- Shut Up!
- Crazy
- Time to Say Goodbye

==== Power Metal Music Pack ====
- Hearts On Fire - HammerFall
- King for a Day - Battle Beast
- Blood Of The Elves - Blind Guardian
- When Angels Kill - Fifth Angel
- Higher - NorthTale
- Twilight Force - Twilight Force

==== Legendary Mix Vol. 2 ====
- American Idiot - Green Day
- Holiday - Green Day
- The American Dream Is Killing Me - Green Day
- I'm Gonna Be (500 Miles) - The Proclaimers
- Stricken - Disturbed

==== Pantera x Disturbed Music Pack ====
- Walk - Pantera
- 5 Minutes Alone - Pantera
- Down with the Sickness - Disturbed
- Ten Thousand Fists - Disturbed

==== Smash Fest Music Pack ====
- Silver Tongue - Alter Bridge
- Army of the Night - Powerwolf
- Pisces - Jinjer
- Keelhauled - Alestorm
- Hootsforce - Gloryhammer
- While Love Died - Northward
- Stardust - Delain
- Das elfte Gebot - Feuerschwanz
- Master of the Universe - Angus McSix

==== Cyberpunk 2077 Music Pack ====
Music from the game Cyberpunk 2077. Some of the songs are also included in the previous DLC.

- Chippin' In - SAMURAI
- Never Fade Away - SAMURAI
- A Like Supreme - SAMURAI
- The Ballad of Buck Ravers
- Hootsforce - Gloryhammer
- While Love Died - Northward
- Stardust - Delain
- Das elfte Gebot - Feuerschwanz
- Master of the Universe - ANGUS McSIX

==== Linkin Park Music Pack ====
Songs from the american rock band Linkin Park.

- In the End
- Numb
- Faint
- One Step Closer
- Somewhere I Belong

==== Anime Mix Vol.1 ====
- Silhouette - Kana-Boon
- unravel - TK from Ling tosite sigure
- VIVID VICE - Who-ya Extended
- The Cruel Angel's Thesis - Yoko Takahashi

==== Stage Dive Scene Pack ====
- Drunken Dwarves - Wind Rose
- Melancholy Angel - Visions Of Atlantis
- Sainted by The Storm - Powerwolf
- Laser-Shooting Dinosaur - Angus McSix

==== Payday Music Pack ====
Songs from the Payday video game series.

- On the Road
- Death Wish
- Da Capo
- No Rest for the Wicked

==== Power Metal 2 Music Pack ====
- Demons Are A Girl's Best Friend - Powerwolf
- Lionheart - Serenity
- Valhalla - Feuerschwanz
- Mexico - Alestorm
- Field of Swords - Bloodbound
- Kings of Ragnarök - Warkings

== Reception ==
Reception

Aggregate score
| Aggregator | Score |
|---|---|
| Metacritic | Meta Quest: 73/100 |

PushSquare scored it as 6 out of 10, judging it "A Pretty Fun, but Uneven Experience". PlayStation Universe gave it 7 out of 10, citing "Drums Rock is generally a delightful rhythm game with a classic feel to it. It does suffer somewhat for a limited tracklist with little star power, but they do at least work just right for a drum-focused game."

Psxbr gave it a 80 out of 100 score. Meristation gave it a 7.5 out of 10, citing "Garage 51's compatriots transport us to the golden age of Harmonix and musical games with a proposal that inherits the Rock Band formula, but without gadgets involved. Fun, intuitive and with a very satisfactory difficulty and progression curve, the result is notable and can barely be blamed for some sporadic detection errors and the small and controversial nature of its playlist (with few licenses and mostly covers)."

Drums Rock was the 10th most downloaded PSVR 2 game in Japan in 2023, as well as the 8th most downloaded in US and 9th in Europe in February 2023.
