= Michael Jordan: Chaos in the Windy City =

1994 video game

- North American box art featuring Michael Jordan
- Developer: Electronic Arts
- Publishers: NA: Electronic Arts; EU: Ocean Software
- Producer: Jim Rushing
- Designer: Amy Hennig
- Programmers: David O'Connor; Chuck Sommerville; Simon Freeman; Lisa Ching
- Composers: David Whittaker; Murray Allen; Marc Farley; Don Veca
- Platform: Super Nintendo Entertainment System
- Release: NA: November 1994; EU: 1995
- Genres: Action, platformer
- Mode: Single-player

Michael Jordan: Chaos in the Windy City is a platform video game developed and published by Electronic Arts for the Super Nintendo Entertainment System. The game was released in North America in November 1994 and in Europe by Ocean Software in 1995. A Sega Genesis version was planned but never released.

== Gameplay ==
The game played much like other side-scrolling platform games of its time, collecting keys and defeating enemies with a variety of different techniques. The player controls Michael Jordan on a quest to save the rest of the players for an All-Star charity game, who have all been kidnapped. The player attacks enemies using different basketballs, each with its own ability; for example, the freeze ball can freeze the ground and create a slippery surface, the bomb ball makes a large explosion, and so on. The player must find keys throughout the game to unlock different doors and rescue teammates. Michael can also slam dunk for a secondary attack. This is also used to activate power-up baskets and various checkpoints along the way.

== Plot ==
A little before the Scottie Pippen charity game, Michael Jordan's teammates are abducted by mad scientist Maximus Cranium. The protagonist must save them before it is too late.

== Development ==
This was Amy Hennig's first game as a designer; she would later be best known for working on video games at Naughty Dog.

== Reception ==
Reception

Review scores
Publication	Score
Computer and Video Games	72/100
EP Daily	8/10
Game Players	72%
GameFan	82/100, 79/100, 74/100
Next Generation	2/5
Official Nintendo Magazine	83/100
Super Play	83%
Total!	(UK) 82/100, (DE) 3
Digital Press	8/10
Super Gamer	70/100
VideoGames	7/10

GamePro's Lawrence Neves gave the game a positive review. While acknowledging that the blatant product placement is annoying, and criticized the controls as extremely difficult, Neves gave the game a positive recommendation based on its varied gameplay and "intense, complex levels". Nintendo Power commented on the game stating that "Michael has some cool moves" and noted the game's "good graphics" and that the "play control seems loose at times" and that it had "generic platform game enemies with simple AI". A reviewer for Next Generation commended its concept but were critical about the backgrounds, which they found "redundant" and the mazes "repetitious". Super Play praised the game for having many levels and sub levels despite noting its bizarre plot.

In September 1997, Nintendo Power had 12 staff members vote for the ten worst games of all time, with Michael Jordan: Chaos in the Windy City placed at seventh worst. The article said the game was not too poor, but was a waste of a license.

== See also ==
- Shaq Fu
- Barkley Shut Up and Jam!
- Slam City with Scottie Pippen
