= Amy Hennig =

American video game writer and director

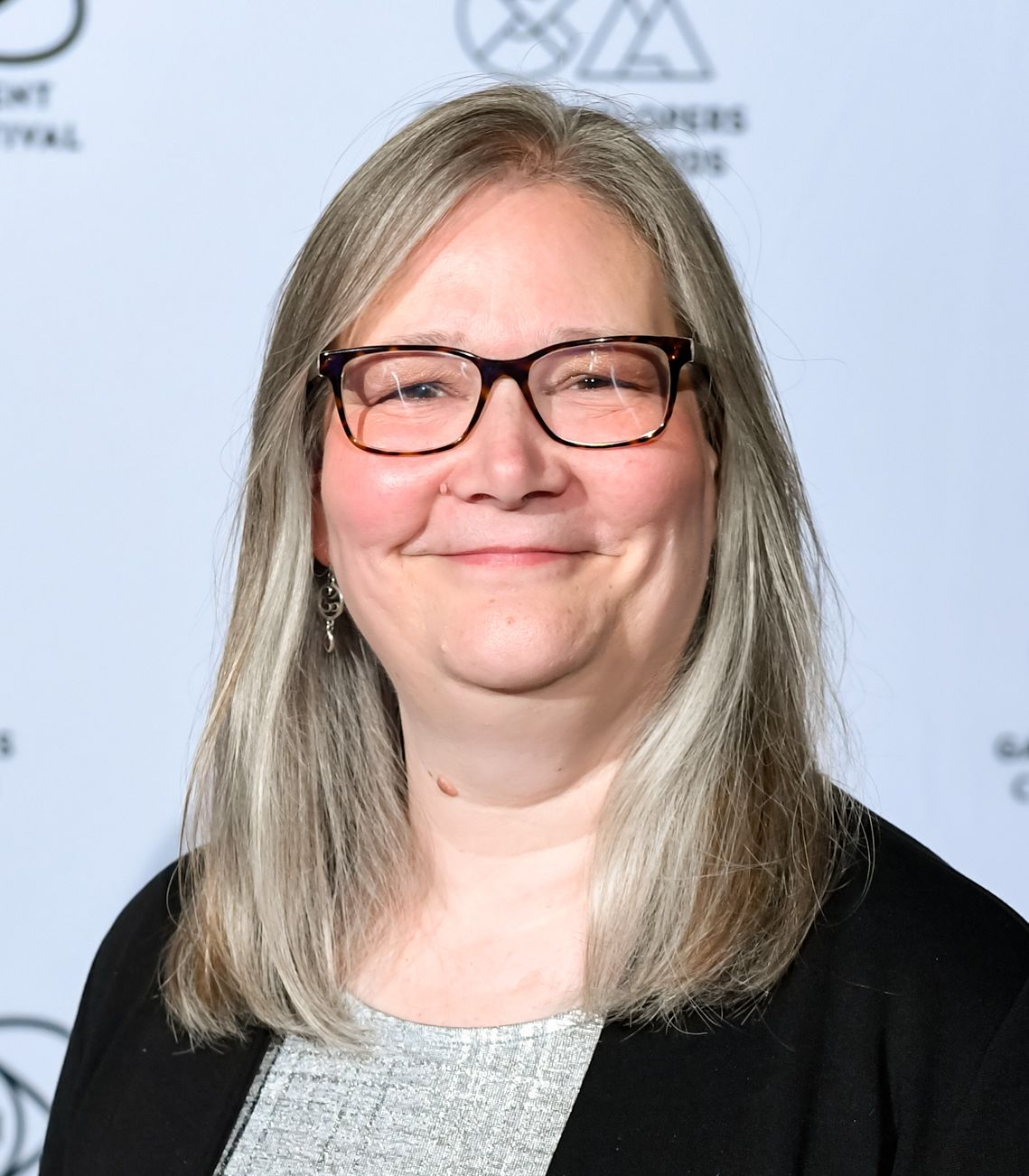
- Hennig in 2019
- Born: August 19, 1964 (age 62); United States
- Education: University of California, Berkeley
- Occupations: Video game writer; video game director
- Writing career
- Notable works: Legacy of Kain series Jak and Daxter series Uncharted series
- Notable awards: Special BAFTA Games Award; Game Developers Choice Awards Lifetime Achievement

Amy Hennig (born August 19, 1964) is an American video game designer, writer, and director. She is best known as the creator of the Uncharted series. She currently serves as studio creative director for Paramount Games Studio.

== Life ==
Hennig graduated from University of California, Berkeley with a bachelor's degree in English literature. She went on to the film school at San Francisco State University, when she was hired as an artist for an Atari game called ElectroCop. Her work on the game made her realize that the video game industry interested her more than the film industry; she dropped out of film school soon after. Hennig has said that her literature degree and film studies have helped her work: "Everything I learned as an undergraduate with English literature and in film school about editing and shots and the language of film has come into play, but in a way I couldn't possibly have planned."

== Career ==
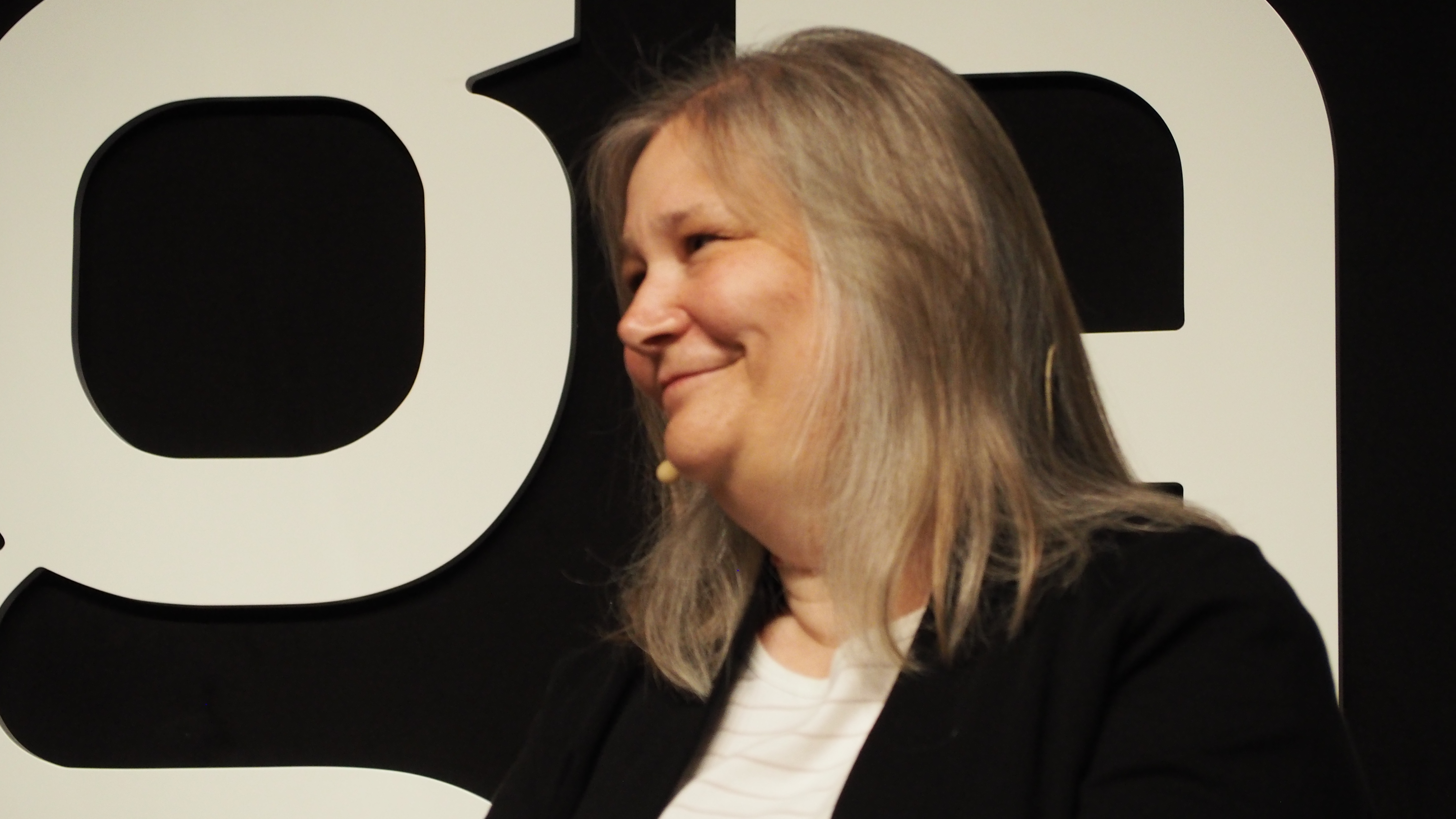
Hennig in 2018

Hennig has worked in the video game industry since the late 1980s. Most of her early jobs involved games on the Nintendo Entertainment System, where she was primarily employed as an artist and animator. Her first job was as a freelance artist for Electrocop, an unreleased Atari 7800 game, based on the Atari Lynx launch title. Afterwards she joined Electronic Arts as an animator and artist, doing work on an unreleased title, Bard's Tale 4, and Desert Strike. She later moved to designing and directing video games.

Two years after being hired at Electronic Arts, Hennig worked as an artist on Michael Jordan: Chaos in the Windy City. However, when the lead designer quit, Hennig landed the job. In the late 1990s, she moved to Crystal Dynamics, where she assisted Silicon Knights in the development of Blood Omen: Legacy of Kain. Later, she acted as the director, producer, and writer for Legacy of Kain: Soul Reaver. She also directed and wrote Soul Reaver 2 and Legacy of Kain: Defiance.

Hennig departed Crystal Dynamics to act as the creative director for Naughty Dog. She contributed to the Jak and Daxter series before working as the game director for Uncharted: Drake's Fortune, and as head writer and creative director for the Uncharted series. With Uncharted 2: Among Thieves, Hennig led the 150-person team who created the game, as well as acting as writer. She won two Writers Guild of America Video Game Writing Awards in addition to several other awards for her work on Uncharted 2 and Uncharted 3: Drake's Deception. After directing and writing Uncharted 3 and beginning work on Uncharted 4: A Thief's End for the PlayStation 4, Hennig left Naughty Dog in 2014.

In April 2014, Hennig joined Visceral Games with Todd Stashwick to work on Project Ragtag, a Star Wars game. It was reported in October 2017, that EA was shutting down Visceral Games and that their Star Wars project was delayed and moved to another studio to allow for "significant change". A representative of EA told Polygon that EA are "in discussions with Amy about her next move". Hennig announced the following June that she had left EA in January and started a small studio to explore options involving virtual reality games.

In November 2019, Hennig announced she had joined Skydance Media to start a new division there, Skydance New Media, for "new story-focused experiences [that] will employ state-of-the-art computer graphics to provide the visual fidelity of television and film, but with an active, lean-in experience that puts the audience in the driver's seat". Stashwick said in May 2021 that he was working with Hennig on an action-adventure game; in September, this was revealed to be Forspoken. Hennig and Stashwick are part of the writing team alongside Gary Whitta and Allison Rymer.

In October 2021, Skydance New Media later announced that it was working with Marvel Entertainment to produce a new action-adventure game that will take place in the Marvel Universe. In September 2022, it was revealed that it was an untitled Captain America and Black Panther game. In March 2024, the game's name was revealed as Marvel 1943: Rise of Hydra.

In April 2022, Skydance New Media and Lucasfilm Games announced they are working on a narrative-driven, action-adventure game "featuring an original story in the Star Wars galaxy", with Hennig at the helm.

In June 2026, Paramount Skydance announced that Paramount Games Studio was a new publisher and developer resulted from the merger between Skydance New Media, Skydance Interactive and Paramount Game Studios, with Amy Hennig acting as creative director for the studio.

== Style ==
Hennig believes the term "platformer" is outdated and misused with many modern games, preferring a different term like "traversal" for some. In 2007 she said that video game developers were too obsessed with graphical realism. She predicted that as game technology improves, developers would explore using graphics for creative expression instead of realism.

She often uses supporting characters to highlight personality aspects of other characters through interactions within the script. For example, Chloe Frazer acts as a foil for Nathan Drake, highlighting the darker aspects of his personality and past. With her work in the Uncharted series, Hennig described the writing and plot as on the "bleeding edge" of the genre of cinematic video games.

== Influence and legacy ==
Hennig has been cited as an example of a successful woman in a historically male-dominated industry, and of how women are taking more important roles within it. Hennig herself says that she has not encountered sexism in the industry, but that differing perspective from men in the industry has helped on some occasions. The UK video magazine Edge named her one of the 100 most influential women in the game industry.

Hennig was given a BAFTA Special Award in June 2016. She received the Lifetime Achievement award at the Game Developers Choice Awards in March 2019.

== Works ==
Name	Year	Credited with	Publisher
Electrocop	1989	Artist	Atari Corporation
The Bard's Tale IV	Canceled	Artist	Electronic Arts
Desert Strike: Return to the Gulf	1992	Artist	Electronic Arts
Michael Jordan: Chaos in the Windy City	1994	Designer, artist	Electronic Arts
3D Baseball	1996	Artist	Crystal Dynamics
Blood Omen: Legacy of Kain	1996	Design manager	Crystal Dynamics
Legacy of Kain: Soul Reaver	1999	Director, producer, writer	Eidos Interactive
Soul Reaver 2	2001	Director, writer	Eidos Interactive
Legacy of Kain: Defiance	2003	Director, writer	Eidos Interactive
Jak 3	2004	Game director	Sony Computer Entertainment
Uncharted: Drake's Fortune	2007	Creative director, writer	Sony Computer Entertainment
Uncharted 2: Among Thieves	2009	Creative director, writer	Sony Computer Entertainment
Uncharted 3: Drake's Deception	2011	Creative director, writer	Sony Computer Entertainment
Uncharted: Golden Abyss	2011	Story consultant	Sony Computer Entertainment
Battlefield Hardline	2015	Writer	Electronic Arts
Forspoken	2023	Story concept	Square Enix
Marvel 1943: Rise of Hydra	TBA	Producer, writer	Paramount Games Studio
