= Skydance Media =

American production and media financing company (2006–2025)

Skydance Media, LLC
- Logo used since 2020
- Trade name: Skydance
- Formerly: Skydance Productions (2006–2016)
- Type: Private
- Industry: Entertainment
- Founded: April 4, 2006; 20 years ago
- Founder: David Ellison
- Defunct: August 7, 2025; 15 months ago
- Fate: Acquired National Amusements and merged with Paramount Global to form Paramount Skydance (now Skydance); brand still active
- Successors: Skydance
- Headquarters: Santa Monica, California, United States
- Area served: Global
- Key people: David Ellison (CEO); Dana Goldberg (CCO); Don Granger (EVP of Feature Productions); Jesse Sisgold (president and COO); Larry Wasserman (CFO and co-president)
- Products: Animation; Film industry
- Brands: Uncharted (label)
- Divisions: Skydance Television; Skydance Animation; Skydance Interactive; Skydance Sports; Nocturna; Skydance Development
- Website: skydance.com

Skydance Media, LLC (formerly known as Skydance Productions) was an American media production and financing company founded by David Ellison and based in Santa Monica, California, that was active from April 4, 2006 to August 7, 2025. It specialized in films, animation, television, video games, and sports.

In 2009, the company entered a five-year partnership to co-produce and co-finance films with Paramount Pictures. This agreement was renewed twice, extending to 2021. On July 7, 2024, Skydance announced its intent to merge with Paramount Global in an $8 billion transaction, under an agreement in which Skydance would acquire Paramount's controlling shareholder National Amusements, and then perform an all-stock merger with the company. On July 24, 2025, the merger was approved by the FCC, and the merger was closed on August 7, 2025, forming Paramount Skydance (now known as Skydance). Skydance Media's film library was transferred to Paramount Pictures. Despite this, the Skydance brand continues to remain active across its divisions (like Skydance Animation or Skydance Sports), along as a vanity card used for any upcoming films produced by Ellison, and the name for the parent company, Skydance.

== History ==
=== Formation ===
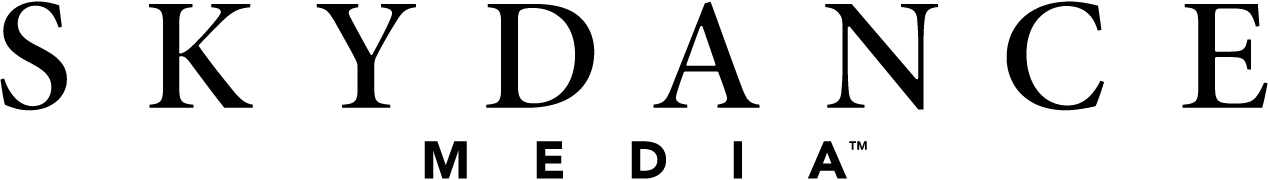
Logo used from 2016 to 2020

Skydance Productions was formed in 2006 by David Ellison, son of Larry Ellison, co-founder and then-CEO of the Oracle Corporation. David, a pilot, had an interest in aviation and took inspiration for the company name from flying aerobatics known as "skydancing". The firm's first film was Flyboys in 2006 which starred David and was co-financed with Metro-Goldwyn-Mayer.

In the fall of 2009, Skydance and Paramount Pictures signed a five-year co-financing, production and distribution agreement, with Paramount holding an additional option of distribution. Before August 2010, Skydance hired Dana Goldberg, formerly of Village Roadshow Pictures, to oversee development and production as chief creative officer. In August 2010, with the Paramount partnership and an equity investment by Larry, who was then the sixth richest person in the world, Skydance raised $350 million in equity and credit to co-finance its films.

On October 25, 2011, Skydance tried to sign its own first production client with Alex Kurtzman and the late Roberto Orci of K/O Paper Products, but the deal never materialized.

=== Expansion ===
On May 1, 2013, Skydance launched Skydance Television, hiring Marcy Ross as division president. In 2014, Jesse Sisgold joined Skydance, titled President of Business Affairs & Strategic Planning; later that year he was promoted to chief operating officer (COO). In 2017, he was promoted to president, while continuing as COO. In March 2014, Don Granger joined the company as executive vice president of Feature Productions, a newly created position, reporting to Goldberg.. In March 2015, Anne Globe joined the company as chief marketing officer.

Later in 2015, Skydance raised $700 million in new financing, consisting of $200 million in equity from a group of investors and a $500 million line of credit from J.P. Morgan Chase. Skydance renewed its slate deal with Paramount in the summer of 2013 for four more years.

On May 3, 2016, Skydance launched the Skydance Interactive division following the acquisition of The Workshop Entertainment and announced in January 2017 for a new story-driven virtual reality game titled Archangel. Skydance also created a production label named Uncharted in December 2016 to house content which falls outside of the action, sci-fi, or fantasy genres. It was also in 2016 that Skydance Productions re-branded to "Skydance Media".

On March 16, 2017, Skydance launched the Skydance Animation division by forming a multi-year partnership with Madrid-based Ilion Animation Studios. In August 2017, Skydance and Paramount renewed their slate deal for another four years to 2021, with the addition of Skydance's animated films for distribution.

On January 25, 2018, Tencent bought a 5% to 10% minority stake. Jun Oh was hired by Skydance Media as head of theatrical, interactive and legal affairs in October 2018. In February 2020, RedBird Capital Partners and CJ ENM invested in the company. In April 2020, Skydance Media named veteran entertainment executive Stephanie Kyoko McKinnon to the newly created post of general counsel. On October 20, 2021, Skydance announced Skydance Sports, a new division led by Jon Weinbach that would produce sports-themed content.

In January 2022, Skydance reached a non-exclusive multi-year first-look deal with Apple Original Films for a slate of live-action films. Variety reported that the agreement called for two films per-year at a budget of at least $125 million each, and Skydance receiving a payout of at least $25 million per-film. Skydance would also retain the intellectual property rights to the films produced under the agreement, and would still be allowed to work with other distributors.

On October 13, 2022, Skydance completed a $400 million strategic investment round which was led by KKR, a first-time investor, and joined by the Ellison family who are majority shareholders. By April 13, 2023, Skydance Media backed a new venture from country star Tim McGraw based in Nashville called "Down Home"; with two scripted series in development, along with plans on features and animation to follow. On July 7, Skydance brought a new $1 billion credit facility, giving the film and television studio enhanced flexibility to invest in its business lines.

=== Merger with Paramount Global ===
In January 2024, it was reported that David Ellison was interested in buying Paramount Global's parent company National Amusements from Shari Redstone. Skydance held exclusive talks with Paramount on a merger, but the window expired with no deal in place. An independent committee representing Paramount would go on to recommend a revised offer from Ellison that would see Skydance purchase National Amusements for $2 billion. In June 2024, CNBC reported that Skydance and Paramount agreed to terms on a merger, which was awaiting approval from National Amusements.

After it was reported on June 11 that merger talks had fallen apart, negotiations between the two were reported to have restarted on July 2, and Skydance was reported to have reached a preliminary agreement. On July 7, Ellison officially announced his intent for Skydance to take over Paramount Global in an $8 billion deal, after having received approval from a special board committee. The deal will be structured so that a group of investors from Skydance will pay $2.4 billion in cash to purchase National Amusements, and Paramount Global will pay its Class A and Class B stockholders $4.5 billion in cash and shares. Paramount would add $1.5 billion in primary capital to its balance sheet. The second phase will see an all-stock merger between Skydance Media and Paramount, valued at $4.75 billion. Paramount Global would have 45 days to look for better or matching offers from other bidders before finalizing.

On July 24, 2025, the FCC approved the merger. The merger closed on August 7, 2025.

After the merger of Skydance Media, National Amusements and Paramount Global, Paramount Skydance (now known as Skydance Corporation) was formed as the newly merged entity on August 7, 2025, with David Ellison serving as the chairman and CEO of the company. Besides serving as the corporate name of the combined entity, the Skydance brand continues to remain active across several divisions (like Skydance Animation or Skydance Sports), and as a vanity card used for any upcoming films produced by David Ellison.

== Filmography ==
=== Feature films ===
==== Released ====
Release	Title	Co-production companies	Distributor(s)
as Skydance Productions
September 22, 2006	Flyboys	Metro-Goldwyn-Mayer, Ingenious Media and Electric Entertainment	MGM Distribution Co.
December 22, 2010	True Grit	Mike Zoss Productions and Scott Rudin Productions	Paramount Pictures
December 16, 2011	Mission: Impossible – Ghost Protocol	Bad Robot and TC Productions	Paramount Pictures
December 19, 2012	The Guilt Trip	Michaels/Goldwyn	Paramount Pictures
December 21, 2012	Jack Reacher	TC Productions	Paramount Pictures
March 28, 2013	G.I. Joe: Retaliation	Metro-Goldwyn-Mayer, Hasbro Studios and Di Bonaventura Pictures	Paramount Pictures
May 15, 2013	Star Trek Into Darkness	Bad Robot and K/O Paper Products	Paramount Pictures
June 21, 2013	World War Z	Hemisphere Media Capital, Plan B Entertainment and GK Films	Paramount Pictures
January 17, 2014	Jack Ryan: Shadow Recruit	Di Bonaventura Pictures and Mace Neufeld Productions	Paramount Pictures
July 1, 2015	Terminator Genisys	Annapurna Pictures	Paramount Pictures
July 31, 2015	Mission: Impossible – Rogue Nation	Bad Robot, Alibaba Pictures, China Movie Channel and TC Productions	Paramount Pictures
as Skydance
July 22, 2016	Star Trek Beyond	Alibaba Pictures, Huahua Media, Bad Robot, Sneaky Shark Productions and Perfect Storm Entertainment	Paramount Pictures
October 21, 2016	Jack Reacher: Never Go Back	TC Productions, Shanghai Film Group and Huahua Media	Paramount Pictures
March 24, 2017	Life	Columbia Pictures and Mockingbird Pictures	Sony Pictures Releasing
May 25, 2017	Baywatch	under Uncharted; Shanghai Film Group, Huahua Media, Seven Bucks Productions, The Montecito Picture Company, Fremantle Productions and Flynn Picture Company	Paramount Pictures
October 20, 2017	Geostorm	Electric Entertainment and RatPac-Dune Entertainment	Warner Bros. Pictures
February 23, 2018	Annihilation	Scott Rudin Productions and DNA Films	Paramount Pictures (U.S. and Chinese distribution); Netflix (International distribution)
July 27, 2018	Mission: Impossible – Fallout	Alibaba Pictures, Bad Robot and TC Productions	Paramount Pictures
October 11, 2019	Gemini Man	Alibaba Pictures, Fosun Pictures and Jerry Bruckheimer Films	Paramount Pictures
November 1, 2019	Terminator: Dark Fate	Tencent Pictures and Lightstorm Entertainment	Paramount Pictures (U.S. distribution); Buena Vista International (International distribution under 20th Century Fox name)
December 13, 2019	6 Underground	Bay Films	Netflix
July 10, 2020	The Old Guard	Denver and Delilah Productions and Marc Evans Productions	Netflix
April 30, 2021	Without Remorse	Paramount Pictures, New Republic Pictures, Weed Road Pictures, Outlier Society and Midnight Radio Productions	Amazon Studios
July 2, 2021	The Tomorrow War	Paramount Pictures and New Republic Pictures	Amazon Studios
July 23, 2021	Snake Eyes	Metro-Goldwyn-Mayer, Entertainment One and Di Bonaventura Pictures	Paramount Pictures
March 11, 2022	The Adam Project	21 Laps Entertainment and Maximum Effort	Netflix
May 27, 2022	Top Gun: Maverick	Don Simpson/Jerry Bruckheimer Films and TC Productions	Paramount Pictures
August 5, 2022	Luck	under Skydance Animation; Apple Original Films	Apple TV+
September 30, 2022	The Greatest Beer Run Ever	Apple Original Films and Living Films	Apple TV+
April 5, 2023	Air	under Skydance Sports; Artists Equity, Studio 8 and Mandalay Pictures	Amazon Studios (U.S. distribution); Warner Bros. Pictures (International distribution)
April 21, 2023	Ghosted	Apple Studios	Apple TV+
June 9, 2023	Transformers: Rise of the Beasts	Hasbro, Bayhem Films, New Republic Pictures and Di Bonaventura Pictures	Paramount Pictures
July 12, 2023	Mission: Impossible – Dead Reckoning	TC Productions	Paramount Pictures
August 11, 2023	Heart of Stone	Pilot Wave and Mockingbird Pictures	Netflix
September 22, 2023	Spy Kids: Armageddon	Troublemaker Studios and Spyglass Media Group	Netflix
December 15, 2023	The Family Plan	Apple Studios and Municipal Pictures	Apple TV+
November 22, 2024	Spellbound	under Skydance Animation	Netflix
February 14, 2025	The Gorge	Apple Studios, Lit Entertainment Group and Crooked Highway	Apple TV+
May 23, 2025	Mission: Impossible – The Final Reckoning	TC Productions	Paramount Pictures
May 23, 2025	Fountain of Youth	Apple Studios, Project X Entertainment and Radio Silence Productions	Apple TV+
July 2, 2025	The Old Guard 2	Denver and Delilah Productions and Marc Evans Productions	Netflix
November 21, 2025	The Family Plan 2	Apple Studios and Municipal Pictures	Apple TV
March 27, 2026	They Will Kill You	under Nocturna; New Line Cinema	Warner Bros. Pictures
April 15, 2026	Balls Up	Reese/Wernick Productions	Amazon MGM Studios
May 1, 2026	Swapped	under Skydance Animation	Netflix
September 4, 2026	Mayday	Apple Studios and Maximum Effort	Apple TV
October 9, 2026	Matchbox: The Movie	Apple Studios and Mattel Studios	Apple TV

==== Upcoming ====
Release	Title	Co-production companies	Distributor(s)	Ref.
November 25, 2026	Way of the Warrior Kid	Apple Studios, Wonderland Sound and Vision, Everard Entertainment and Indivisible Productions	Apple TV	
December 18, 2026	Ray Gunn	under Skydance Animation	Netflix	
December 25, 2026	Mr. Irrelevant	under Skydance Sports; Megamix and Blackjack Films	Paramount Pictures	

==== In development ====
Title	Co-production companies	Distributor(s)	Ref.
The 47 Night Stand	Orchard Farm Productions	TBA	
Atlantis	Metronome Film Co.	TBA	
Bermuda	Crooked Highway and Mockingbird Pictures	TBA	
Best Served Cold	Blur Studio	TBA	
Buck Rogers	TBA	TBA	
Cosmic Motors	under Skydance Animation	Paramount Pictures	
Drift	Double Dream and 12:01 Films	TBA	
Eternal Champions	Sega Sammy Group	TBA	
Rainbow Six	87Eleven Entertainment, Weed Road Pictures, Outlier Society and Midnight Radio Productions	Paramount Pictures	
Ranger's Apprentice	TBA	TBA	
Summer Frost	Temple Hill Entertainment	TBA	
The Tomorrow War 2	New Republic Pictures	Amazon MGM Studios	
The Traveler	TBA		
Untitled Jack and the Beanstalk project	under Skydance Animation	Netflix	
Untitled Mike Hammer film	TBA		

== Divisions ==
=== Skydance Television ===
Skydance Television, LLC
- Type: Division
- Industry: TV production
- Founded: May 1, 2013; 13 years ago
- Defunct: August 7, 2025; 15 months ago
- Fate: Merged with MTV Entertainment Studios to form Paramount Television Studios, currently an in-name only label of the company.
- Successor: Paramount Television Studios
- Headquarters: Santa Monica, California, United States
- Key people: Matt Thunell (president); Carolyn Harris (vice president)
- Products: Television shows
- Parent: Skydance Media
- Website: skydance.com/tv

Original logo

Skydance Television was a television production company launched by Skydance on May 1, 2013. The division hired Marcy Ross as division president and a month later, Carolyn Harris joined Skydance Television as vice president. However, in January 2020, Ross left her position transitioning to a deal with the media company, where she continues to be an executive producer on Grace and Frankie, Altered Carbon, Condor and Foundation. Bill Bost was promoted from senior vice president to president of Skydance Television. In November 2022, Bost stepped down and launched his own company; Netflix's Matt Thunell took his place.

In May 2014, Jake Rose joined Skydance Television as EVP Production and in March 2018, Carol Turner joined Skydance replacing Rose and overseeing production on site at the studio. By July 2014 its first show, Manhattan, was launched on WGN America; it received critical acclaim throughout its run, but failed to secure adequate ratings, resulting in the series being canceled for 2 seasons in 2015.

Later in April 2017, director Sam Raimi signed his first look deal at Skydance Television with his television producing partner Debbie Liebling. By September 2017, a multi-year overall agreement was signed by producers Patrick Massett and John Zinman after they joined a series which was based on Sword Art Online. After the 2017 announcement of developing a series adaptation of Isaac Asimov's science fiction book series Foundation with David S. Goyer and Josh Friedman serving as the production's writers. In 2018, Apple TV+ bought the streaming rights to the series renewing it for a second season upon its release in 2021. In June 2018, Dietland aired on AMC along with a companion talk show hosted by Aisha Tyler from Archer, under its label company Uncharted.

In September 2019, writer David S. Goyer also signed a deal with Skydance Television for an exclusive multi-year overall agreement as well under his Phantom Four company. In April 2019, Daredevil writer Lewaa Nasserdeen joined Skydance Television in an overall deal as well while developing a semi-autobiographical comedy-drama series on Showtime. In May 2019, Alison Schapker, showrunner of Altered Carbon, made an overall deal with Skydance Television to develop series at the studio, including a US remake of a South Korea series called Hotel del Luna. By August 2019, writer Olivia Purnell had signed an overall deal with Skydance Television writing projects for the studio. In May 2020, Nick Santora also got an overall deal with Skydance Television with a series starting Arnold Schwarzenegger called FUBAR, which was released on Netflix in 2023. In May 2020, Skydance Television named Drew Brown as head of production.

In December 2020, Skydance Television signed a first look deal with Exile Content Studio to develop and produce scripted series. By February 2021, the studio also signed a first look deal with Impact, a global talent network and development accelerator program owned by Ron Howard and Brian Grazer for television productions. In November 2021, Peter Johnson joins Skydance Television as a television executive reporting for Bill Bost. By December 2022, it was announced that Octavia Spencer's production company, Orit Entertainment, has entered a multiyear first-look deal for scripted projects for Skydance Television. On March 21, 2023, James Patterson has signed an exclusive first-look pact with Skydance Television to adapt his works such as the Prime Video series Cross along with other projects in development like Women's Murder Club and the upcoming book Jane Smith. In May 2024, Skydance Television doubles on their series output and signed a first-look TV deal with Gina Prince-Bythewood and Reggie Rock Bythewood from their company Undisputed Cinema.

On August 7, 2025, following Skydance Television parent Skydance Media merged with Paramount Global into forming Paramount Skydance, Skydance Television merged with fellow Paramount Skydance's film & television production unit Showtime/MTV Entertainment Studios into the relaunched television production studio Paramount Television Studios with Skydance Television's state of production being transferred into the revived television studio as Skydance Television president Matt Thunell had joined Paramount Television Studios serving as president of the studio.. The new company continued to use the Skydance Television label for the time being.

==== Television series ====
===== Released =====
Title	First broadcast	Last broadcast	Co-production	Network
Manhattan	July 27, 2014	December 15, 2015	Lionsgate Television, Tribune Studios	WGN America
Grace and Frankie	May 8, 2015	April 29, 2022	Okay Goodnight!	Netflix
Ten Days in the Valley	October 1, 2017	January 6, 2018	Under Uncharted; Pentimento Productions, Cameron Pictures	ABC
Altered Carbon	February 2, 2018	February 27, 2020	Virago Productions, Mythology Entertainment, Phoenix Pictures	Netflix
Dietland	June 4, 2018	July 30, 2018	Under Uncharted; AMC Studios, Mockingbird Pictures, Tiny Pyro	AMC
Unapologetic with Aisha Tyler	June 4, 2018	July 30, 2018	Under Uncharted; AMC Studios, Embassy Row	AMC
Condor	June 6, 2018	August 4, 2020	Apophasis Unproductions, Paramount Television Studios, MGM Television	Audience Network; Epix
Jack Ryan	August 31, 2018	July 14, 2023	Paramount Television Studios, Amazon Studios, Platinum Dunes, Sunday Night Productions, Genre Arts, Push, Boot.	Amazon Prime Video
Foundation	September 24, 2021	Present	Phantom Four	Apple TV+
Reacher	February 4, 2022	Present	Blackjack Films, Paramount Television Studios, Amazon MGM Studios	Amazon Prime Video
The Checkup with Dr. David Agus	December 6, 2022	December 12, 2022	See It Now Studios	Paramount+
The Big Door Prize	March 29, 2023	June 12, 2024	Studio Dragon/CJ ENM, Vidvad, Inc. (season 2)	Apple TV+
FUBAR	May 25, 2023	June 12, 2025	Blackjack Films	Netflix
WondLa	June 28, 2024	November 26, 2025	under Skydance Animation; Gotham Group	Apple TV+
Terminator Zero	August 29, 2024		Production I.G, No Brakes	Netflix
Cross	November 14, 2024	Present	Blue Monday Productions, Paramount Television Studios, Amazon MGM Studios	Amazon Prime Video
The Runarounds	September 1, 2025		Rockfish Films, Amazon MGM Studios	Amazon Prime Video
Aka Charlie Sheen	September 10, 2025		Atlas Entertainment, Boardwalk Pictures and North of Now Group	Netflix

===== Scrapped projects =====
Year	Title	Network	Notes
2017	Red Mars	Spike	Based on the Mars trilogy by Kim Stanley Robinson
2018	Untitled Miraculous live-action TV series	—N/a	Co-production with ZAG Inc. Based on the animated series by Thomas Astruc.
2021	Untitled G.I. Joe Lady Jaye spin-off series	Amazon Prime Video	Co-production with Paramount Television Studios, Entertainment One and Di Bonaventura Pictures. Based on the toyline by Donald Levine.

=== Skydance Interactive ===
Skydance Interactive, LLC
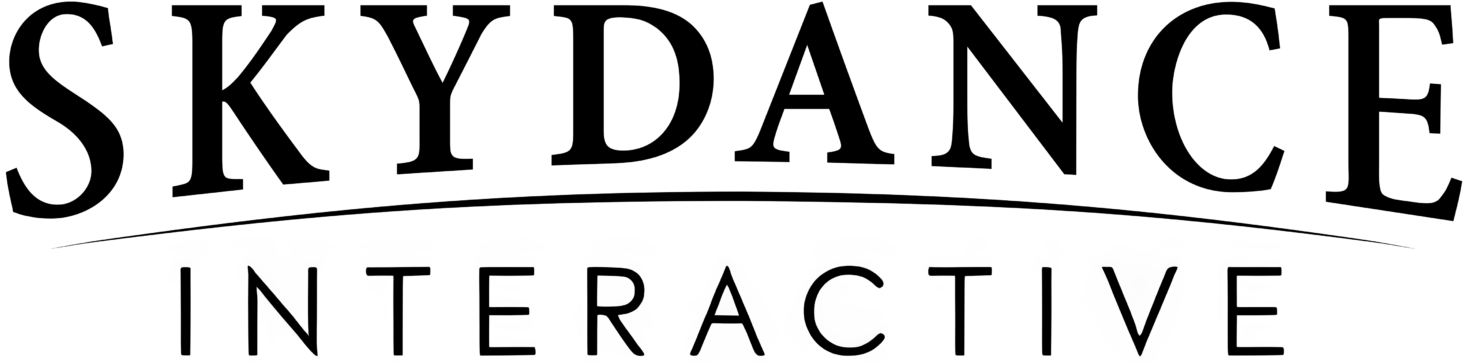
- Formerly: The Workshop Entertainment
- Type: Division
- Industry: Video games
- Founded: May 5, 2016; 10 years ago
- Defunct: June 5, 2026; 5 months ago
- Fate: Merged with Skydance New Media to form Paramount Games Studio
- Successor: Paramount Games Studio
- Headquarters: Marina del Rey, California, United States
- Key people: Dan Prigg (studio head)
- Parent: Paramount Consumer Products (Paramount Skydance)
- Website: skydance.com/interactive skydance.com/games

Original logo

Skydance Interactive (formerly known as The Workshop Entertainment) was a game division which was launched on May 5, 2016. It focuses on developing ambitious titles, managing projects licenses with other developers, and developing software innovative game mechanics as well as for VR and emerging platforms.

In May 2017, Chris Hewish was hired as EVP Interactive help to set and execute overall strategy for Skydance Interactive, and oversee development, partnerships, and new business opportunities. On July 18, 2017, its first VR game, Archangel was launched. The game recently expanded into an online multiplayer upgrade, Archangel: Hellfire. Two days later, Skydance Interactive revealed their second original game called PWND, an multiplayer free to play game released on April 6, 2018, where players use Pwns to win.

In 2018, Skydance Interactive partnered with Skybound Entertainment to develop a number of original virtual reality video games based on the expansive world of The Walking Dead universe. The Walking Dead: Saints & Sinners and The Walking Dead: Saints & Sinners - Chapter 2: Retribution were to be the inaugural titles co-developed by the two companies. In 2023, they also published a Final Cut version of Arashi: Castle of Sin developed by Endeavor One and was released on December 5, 2023 on next-generation virtual reality consoles.

==== Games ====
Release	Title	Co-developers	Platform(s)
July 18, 2017	Archangel	—N/a	Oculus Rift, Microsoft Windows, PlayStation VR
April 6, 2018	PWND	—N/a	Microsoft Windows
January 23, 2020	The Walking Dead: Saints & Sinners	Skybound Entertainment	Oculus Rift, Microsoft Windows, PlayStation VR, Oculus Quest, PICO 4
December 1, 2022	The Walking Dead: Saints & Sinners – Chapter 2: Retribution	Skybound Entertainment	Meta Quest 2, PlayStation VR, PlayStation VR2, PICO 4
December 5, 2023	Arashi: Castles of Sin - Final Cut	Endeavor One	Meta Quest 2, Meta Quest 3, PlayStation VR2, Windows
December 5, 2024	Skydance's Behemoth	—N/a	Meta Quest 3, PlayStation VR2, SteamVR

=== Skydance Animation ===
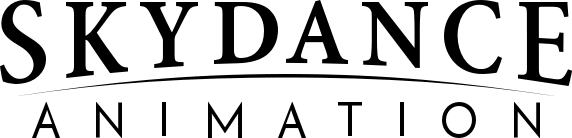

Skydance Animation is the animation division of Paramount Pictures, separate from Paramount Animation; it focuses on animated feature films and television series. It was founded on March 16, 2017. Its first film was Luck and its first short film was Blush.

=== Skydance New Media ===
Skydance New Media
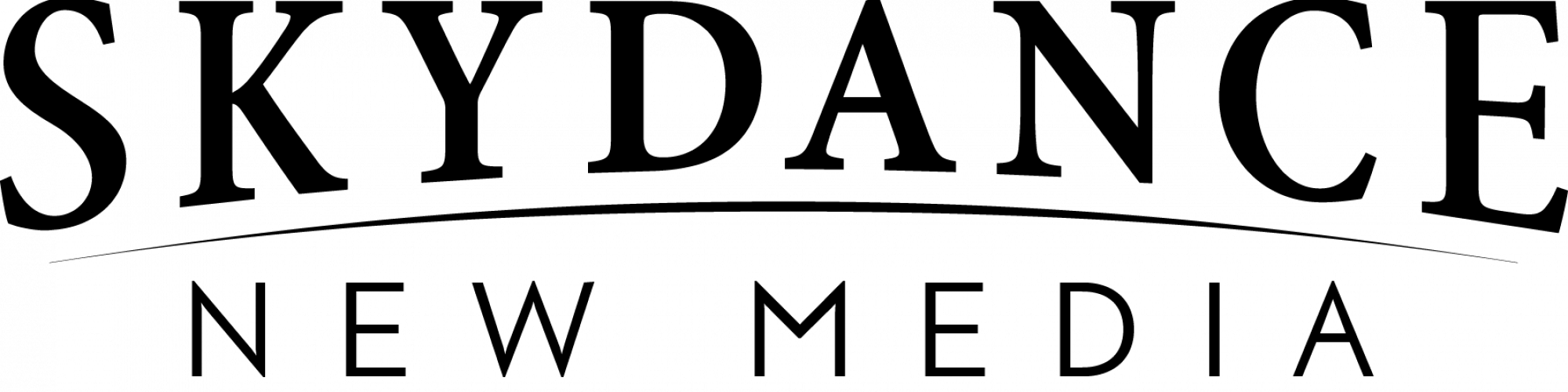
- Type: Division
- Industry: Video games
- Founded: November 18, 2019; 7 years ago
- Defunct: June 5, 2026; 5 months ago
- Fate: Merged with Skydance Interactive to form Paramount Games Studio
- Successor: Paramount Games Studio
- Headquarters: Santa Monica, California, United States
- Key people: Amy Hennig (president); Julian Beak (president)
- Parent: Paramount Consumer Products
- Website: skydance.com/new-media

Skydance New Media was a video game development studio founded by Skydance on November 18, 2019, led by Amy Hennig.

In October 2021, the studio announced a planned collaboration with Marvel Entertainment for an action-adventure game. In April 2022, it was announced that Lucasfilm Games would collaborate making a game based in the Star Wars universe. There has been speculation that the game will be a revival of Project Ragtag which was also led by Henning.

In August 2022, Marvel's parent corporation The Walt Disney Company announced their intentions to showcase a slate of video games based on their IP at the joint Disney & Marvel Games Showcase. It would happen in conjunction with the company's annual D23 Expo in person and through broadcasts on multiple streaming platforms. Along with the announcement, Disney said that the panel would also debut a "sneak peek" at Skydance New Media's Marvel title, which is described as being an "ensemble game". During the showcase on September 9, 2022, the Marvel project confirmed prior reports that it would be set during World War II. Also Captain America and Azzuri / Black Panther will be featured as the main characters in the ensemble, alongside Gabriel Jones of the Howling Commandos unit and Nanali, leader of the Wakandan Spy Network, while the Hydra organization would serve as the main villains. In March 2024, during the showcase of State of Unreal, the project was revealed to be titled Marvel 1943: Rise of Hydra with the game being powered by Unreal Engine 5. Release is slated for 2026, but was delayed to 2027.

=== Skydance Sports ===
Skydance Sports is the division launched by Skydance on October 20, 2021, which is dedicated to sports films, series, and documentaries. It is led by Jon Weinbach.
