= Paramount Consumer Products =

Retailing and licensing division of Paramount Skydance

- Formerly: Nickelodeon & Viacom Consumer Products (1991–2019); ViacomCBS Consumer Products (2019–2022)
- Type: Division
- Industry: Merchandising
- Predecessor: CBS Consumer Products (2009–2019)
- Founded: 1991; 35 years ago
- Headquarters: One Astor Plaza, New York City, United States
- Area served: Worldwide
- Services: Consumer Products, and Licensing
- Owner: Skydance
- Parent: Paramount Pictures
- Subsidiaries: Paramount Shop; Paramount Global Publishing; Paws, Inc; Paramount Licensing, Inc.; Paramount Advertising

Paramount Consumer Products (formerly Nickelodeon & Viacom Consumer Products, then ViacomCBS Consumer Products) is a retailing and licensing division of Skydance. The department is in charge of merchandising for Paramount-owned brands. As of 2015, the division was valued at $3 billion.

While the company manages merchandise for the entire Paramount portfolio (including Paramount Pictures and Comedy Central), its main focus is Paramount's children's television brand, Nickelodeon. Most of its products are based on TV shows that originated on the network, as well as properties that they purchased and incorporated into Nickelodeon, like Teenage Mutant Ninja Turtles and Winx Club. From 2007 onward, the division's most profitable property has been SpongeBob SquarePants.

According to an article in The Chicago Tribune, Paramount Consumer Products takes "an unconventional approach to licensing" where the company waits up to two years after a show's premiere before releasing tie-in merchandise. This is in contrast to competitors like Disney Consumer Products, which generally release products to coincide with a premiere.

== History ==
=== 1990s and 2000s ===
Logo and toys from when the company was known as Nickelodeon & Viacom Consumer Products

Nickelodeon & Viacom Consumer Products (NVCP) was founded in 1991. At first, it was a subdivision of Nickelodeon Enterprises, a business unit set up to license Nickelodeon's properties to other companies.

One of the division's first profitable franchises was Rugrats, which the News & Record called Nickelodeon's "first big splash in consumer products." Merchandise sales for Rugrats peaked at over $1 billion in 1999. The following year, NVCP released merchandise spun off from Blue's Clues, which also garnered over a billion dollars in revenue.

SpongeBob SquarePants represented the "company's biggest surprise" when tie-in products were first released in the early 2000s. Revenues from SpongeBob items exceeded Nickelodeon's expectations by over $250 million. At first, merchandising companies were hesitant to produce merchandise based on the show, and they "underestimated consumers' emotional connection" with it. By 2003, however, there were over 100 companies that were licensed to use the SpongeBob brand.

Shows like SpongeBob helped Nickelodeon Enterprises (the branch of Nickelodeon that included NVCP) become Viacom's fastest-growing asset in the early 2000s. In 2003, Nickelodeon's consumer products arm generated $2.5 billion in sales, which marked a 19 percent increase from the year before. Meanwhile, the sales of the company's main competitors (Disney and Warner Bros.) were both flat compared to the previous year.

In late 2003, the division experimented with creating a pair of new properties that were not based on TV characters. These "off-channel" brands were the video game franchise Tak and the Power of Juju and everGirl, a doll line and website designed to promote a positive self-image for girls. everGirl was co-created by Angela Santomero (one of the creators of Blue's Clues) and its development was overseen by Leigh Anne Brodsky, who went onto become the president of NVCP from 2004 to late 2011.

Nickelodeon & Viacom Consumer Products took over Paramount Pictures' licensing activities in 2004, relocating all operations to New York. Paramount had previously managed licensing out of its own Hollywood offices. Three years later, Paramount founded a separate department called Paramount Licensing.

In 2007, NVCP named Jakks Pacific as the master licensee for SpongeBob SquarePants, continuing a long partnership between the two companies.

=== 2010s ===
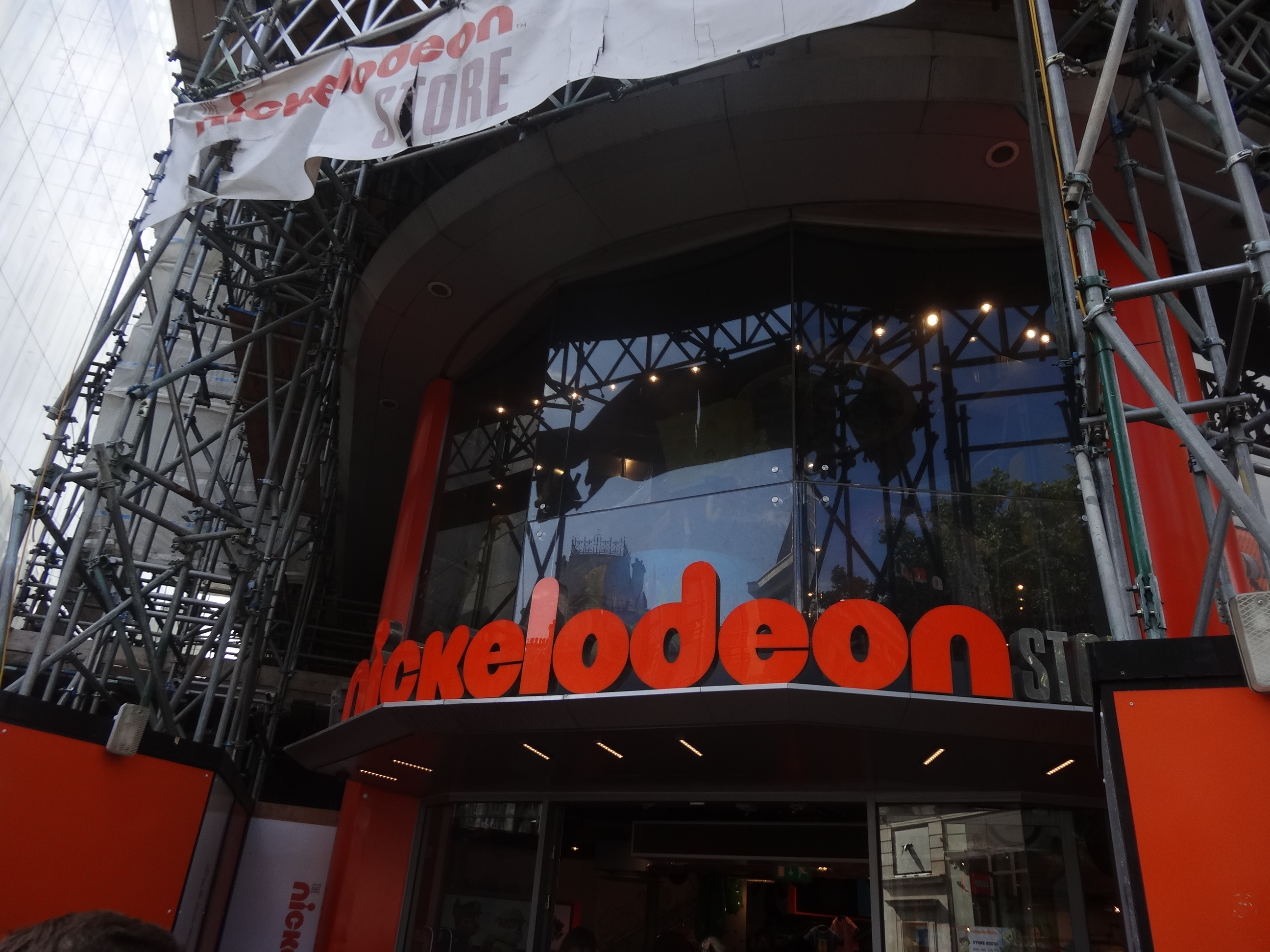
Entrance to the Nickelodeon Store in London

Nickelodeon & Viacom Consumer Products appointed Michael Connolly, a former Disney Consumer Products executive, as head of international consumer products in 2010. In the following years, Connolly helped relaunch two brands that Viacom had purchased: Teenage Mutant Ninja Turtles and Winx Club. Connolly said that TMNT represented an opportunity to appeal to collectors and the "comic book geek crowd" while Winx Club provided Nickelodeon "with a much-needed girl's property." One of Nickelodeon's top priorities for 2012 was to reboot both franchises worldwide; Kidscreen reported that the company had "international plans to make a splash at retail with the rebooted Teenage Mutant Ninja Turtles and Winx IPs."

In 2012, Connolly suggested that Viacom's consumer products had been decreasingly relevant to the public for several years, and that he hoped the introduction of the toyetic brands TMNT and Winx Club would change this. Connolly also stated that SpongeBob toys did not sell as well as other non-toy products based on the franchise:

While SpongeBob is a great franchise, it has never been a heavy-hitting toy aisle property. With TMNT, that's all about to change, and buyers believe that TMNT will re-invigorate the toy aisle. Winx [Club] puts us more prominently in the girl's aisle and offers wider opportunities.

From 2013 to 2015, Nickelodeon & Viacom Consumer Products started to open Nickelodeon-branded stores worldwide, including a flagship location in Leicester Square, London. Around 80 percent of the stores' merchandise was exclusive; Nickelodeon opened an online e-commerce site at NickelodeonStore.co.uk so that international fans could buy it. By 2016, NVCP had opened twelve different Nickelodeon stores.

Following the 2019 merger of CBS and Viacom, Nickelodeon & Viacom Consumer Products (NVCP) was renamed ViacomCBS Consumer Products (VCP), and it began to manage merchandise for CBS-owned properties from CBS Television Studios and Showtime. As a result, CBS Consumer Products was integrated into VCP.

== Paramount Games Studio ==
Paramount Games Studio
- Formerly: Paramount Game Studios (2022—2026)
- Type: Subsidiary
- Industry: Video games
- Predecessor: Paramount Digital Entertainment; Nickelodeon Games Group; Skydance New Media
- Founded: February 22, 2022; 4 years ago
- Headquarters: One Astor Plaza, New York City, United States
- Key people: Tony Driscoll (president); Dan Prigg (executive vice president, head of games); Shawn Kittelsen (senior vice president, head of creative and production); Amy Hennig (studio creative director)
- Owner: Skydance
- Parent: Skydance Interactive
- Website: https://www.paramountgames.com/

Paramount Games Studio (formerly known as Paramount Game Studios) was a video game studio founded on February 22, 2022. The studio publishes and develops titles based on media from the Skydance Corporation library. It was formed after the merger of Paramount Digital Entertainment and Nickelodeon Games Group. They started off as a licensing brand for games on Roblox and expanded for other gaming platforms later on.

On June 5, 2026, Paramount Skydance announced they folded Skydance Interactive and Skydance New Media into the company and was renamed to Paramount Games Studio as they were growing in the gaming industry.

=== Merger with Warner Bros. ===
In October 2026, it was announced that Paramount Games Studio would be merged with Warner Bros. Games into one combined gaming division, supervised by Tony Driscoll, following Paramount Skydance's acquisition of Warner Bros. Discovery.

List of games
Release	Title	Developers	Platforms
July 23, 2026	Avatar Legends: The Fighting Game	Gameplay Group International	Nintendo Switch, Nintendo Switch 2, PlayStation 5, Xbox Series X/S, Windows
2027	Marvel 1943: Rise of Hydra	Paramount Games Studio	TBA
2027	Star Trek: Shadow Frontier	Bloober Team	Nintendo Switch, Nintendo Switch 2, PlayStation 5, Xbox Series X/S, Windows
TBA	Teenage Mutant Ninja Turtles: The Last Ronin	PlatinumGames	TBA
TBA	Untitled Star Wars game	TBA	TBA
