= PlayStation VR2 =

Virtual reality headset developed by Sony Interactive Entertainment

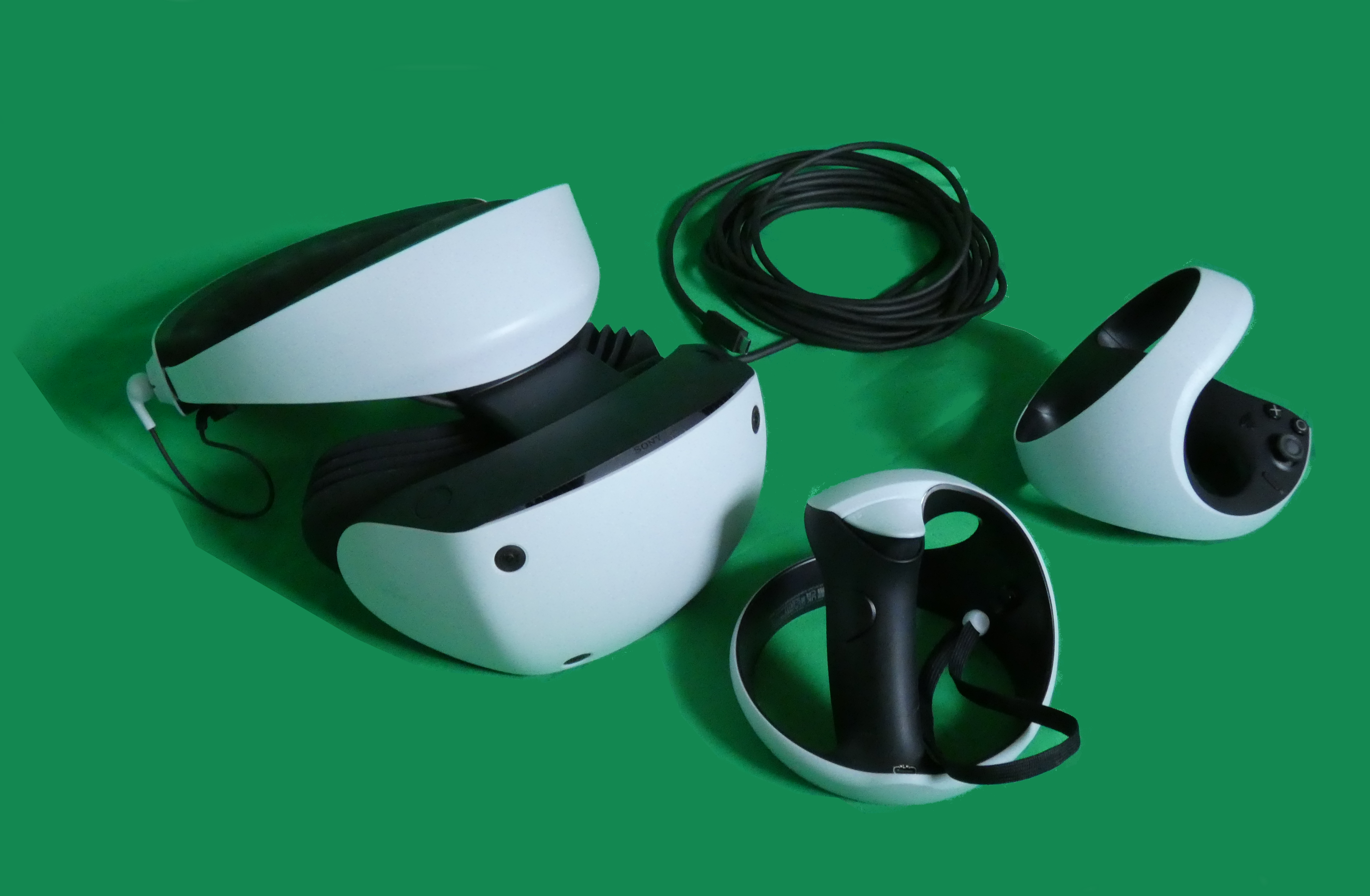
- Also known as: PS VR2 (abbreviation)
- Developer: Sony Interactive Entertainment
- Manufacturer: Sony
- Product family: PlayStation
- Type: Virtual reality headset
- Generation: Ninth
- Released: February 22, 2023
- Introductory price: $549.99 / €599.99 / £529.99
- Units sold: <600,000
- Units shipped: 2,000,000
- Display: OLED, HDR, 110° field of view
- Graphics: PenTile (2000 × 2040 per eye; 90 or 120 Hz refresh rate)
- Controller input: PlayStation VR2 Sense controller, DualSense
- Camera: 4 x outward-facing, 2 x inward-facing (for eye-tracking)
- Platform: PlayStation 5, PC
- Dimensions: 212×158×278 mm (w × h × l)
- Weight: c. 560 grams
- Backward compatibility: No
- Predecessor: PlayStation VR
- Website: playstation.com/ps-vr2/

The PlayStation VR2 (PS VR2) is a virtual reality headset for the PlayStation 5 and PC, developed by Sony Interactive Entertainment and released on February 22, 2023.

== History and development ==
Development of PS VR2 took about six years, and was developed simultaneously alongside the PlayStation 5, with the goal to craft the perfect match of a console and a virtual reality device with "PC connection in mind". Leading up to the PS VR2 release, a display analyst from the Display Supply Chain Consultants (DSCC), said that he expected the upcoming next generation VR headset to have a display with the highest pixel density on a commercial OLED panel, with pixel density "well above 800 PPI".

At the 2022 Consumer Electronics Show, Sony announced the PlayStation VR2 for the PlayStation 5. A release date of February 22, 2023, and a retail price of $549.99 was announced on November 2, 2022, at the official PlayStation Blog.

On February 22, 2024, Sony announced that PC support will be coming to PlayStation VR2 in August 2024. The PlayStation VR2 PC adapter was released on August 7, 2024, through selected retailers to mixed reviews, with issues including lack of various features such as eye tracking and HDR, incompatibility with some bluetooth adapters and motherboards, poor bluetooth reception and the additional cost required (from the adapter and controllers) to connect the PSVR2 to a PC. Eurogamer reportedly encountered a Bluetooth issue pairing the PC with the PSVR2 controllers.

In June 2024, Sony was reported to cut back on game development for the headset.

On December 8, 2024, Bloomberg News reported that Sony were in discussions about making the PSVR2 controllers compatible with the Apple Vision Pro, which could also result in the controllers finally being sold separately from the headset. At Apple's Worldwide Developers Conference in June 2025, it was announced that visionOS 26 for the Apple Vision Pro would include support for PSVR2 controllers.

== Sales ==
In May 2023, Sony announced that slightly less than 600,000 units of PlayStation VR2 has been sold to consumers during its first 6 weeks from launch.

According to IDC, 595,500 units were shipped by Q1 2023, 435,300 in Q2 2023, 343,600 units in Q3 2023 and 325,200 units in Q4 2023 (1,699,600 accumulative units shipped in 2023). As of March 18, 2024, Bloomberg reported that Sony has paused the manufacture of PSVR2 after making well over 2 million units.

== Hardware ==
The headset connects to the PlayStation 5 console through a single USB-C cable that negotiates 12 V via Power Delivery and simultaneous USB 3 data and video via DisplayPort alt-mode, which enables a simple plug and play design. The cable length is 4.5 m (14.7 ft). Sony stated that while they are still researching the technical possibility of a wireless connection, due to concerns about its impact on performance, they chose to go with the cable solution. Compared to the first generation PS VR, the headset overall weight has been reduced, while the headband underwent many design improvements to increase its comfort. The FOV was also increased to approx. 110 degrees.

The headset has a built-in microphone and a stereo 3.5 mm headphone jack. Using the PS5 Tempest 3D AudioTech, the headset supports 3D audio through headphones, allowing the in-game audio to dynamically adapt to the user position and head movements. Additionally, the headset has a cooling system that incorporates a duct and a small fan to cool the onboard IC chip. In addition to cooling the IC chip, this airflow also provides ventilation to help minimize the lenses fogging up while the player is wearing the headset.

The play area for PS VR2 can be customized using the cameras and the Sense controller. There are three different "VR Play Styles" depending on the game content and compatibility–sitting, standing or room-scale (the last one allowing more movement while playing).

=== Vision ===
The PS VR2 has dual OLED panels with a 90 Hz/120 Hz refresh rate. Each display has a resolution of 2,000 x 2,040 pixels and also supports HDR. Similar to the original PS VR, the new PS VR2 also features a Social Screen, which allows others to see what the player is experiencing in a 2D format on a TV screen. Cinematic Mode is also supported, which is used to view all non-VR game and media contents on a virtual cinema screen at 1920x1080 @ 120 Hz HDR.

The headset uses fresnel lenses. These lenses "act on microscopic level to significantly reduce ghosting" and "allow for a beautiful image without sacrificing brightness". PS VR2 has a lens adjustment dial, which allows the headset to accommodate different IPD measurements. The facial interface of the headset was also designed to be able to accommodate different head shapes and nose sizes, and it can be removed from the PS VR2 headset for cleaning.

=== Tracking and feedback ===
Unlike the first generation PlayStation VR, which tracked player movements through an external PlayStation Camera, the PS VR2 tracks movements via four cameras on the front of the headset. These same cameras are also used to track the controllers, and to give video feed for the "see-through view" feature, which allows the user to view their surroundings without needing to take off the headset. The headset also has two inward-facing IR cameras. These are used for eye-tracking to enable games to utilize foveated rendering, a performance optimization technique where the render resolution of the game is reduced in areas where the player is not looking. The eye-tracking can also be used as an input method, such as for selecting UI elements with a glance.

PS VR2 also features headset feedback through a built-in motor, which provides subtle haptic effects for added immersion, such as "feeling the character's heartbeat or feeling the rush of objects passing close to the head". Some sources have pointed out that Sony have previously registered patents which mentioned using haptics to reduce motion sickness.

=== Controlling ===
PS VR2 uses the new Sense controllers. The controller was designed with a focus on balancing the center of gravity and reducing weight, while also maintaining comfort and incorporating new features. The controller is shaped like an "orb or hollowed-out sphere", which is used to ideally place a ring of 14 IR LEDs that is used for tracking its position and orientation. The controller has several features, including key features from the DualSense controller, like its haptic feedback and adaptive triggers technology. Another new feature is the finger touch detection, which can detect the approximate location of the fingers, enabling the user to make more natural gestures during gameplay. This is achieved by using five capacitive finger touch sensors on each controller (four sensors for each button, and one sensor for the analog stick) to detect the placements of the thumb, index, and the middle finger.

In 2024, Sony announced that the VR headset will support controller-free hand tracking, just like with the Meta Quest. A demo for the hand tracking feature was shown off at the SIGGRAPH annual conference in Asia. A player wore the headset and squirted water with their index fingers at random coloured blobs. Two titles for PlayStation VR2 now support controller-free hand tracking, which are Waltz of the Wizard by Aldin Dynamics and Masters of Light from Coven SAS.

In 2025 Worldwide Developers Conference, Apple confirmed the Sense controllers is supported with Apple's Vision Pro mixed-reality headset.

== Games and content ==
Sony announced that more than 100 games are in development, with over 30 titles available at the launch window, including Resident Evil Village, The Walking Dead: Saints & Sinners – Chapter 2: Retribution, Five Nights at Freddy's: Help Wanted 2, No Man's Sky, Star Wars: Tales from the Galaxy's Edge, Demeo, Drums Rock, Moss and Moss: Book II remasters, and PS VR2 exclusives Horizon Call of the Mountain and The Dark Pictures: Switchback VR. Gran Turismo 7 and Beat Saber have also been updated to work with PS VR2.

Gran Turismo 7 was also confirmed to have a full game support on the PS VR2 (except for the 2-player splitscreen mode). This is in contrast to the previous game in the series, Gran Turismo Sport, which was only supported by the original PS VR headset in a limited capacity.

PS VR2 is not compatible with the previous generation PS VR games. Sony said that due to the differences in both the controller tracking hardware and the image rendering principle, porting games from the previous hardware would not be easy. When connected to a PC with the PSVR2 PC adapter, PS VR2 users can gain access to thousands of VR games on Steam.

== Reception ==
Pre-release reviews were mostly positive, lauding the many improvements over its predecessor and its advanced technology. The lack of backward compatibility and the price of the headset received mixed reaction. Various game developers praised the capabilities of the headset, particularly in combination with the PlayStation 5. The new Sense controllers received acclaim from CNET, while Eurogamer singled out the HDR OLED screen for its brightness and contrast, stating that "it now feels more comparable to a proper high-end OLED TV". Some reviewers criticized the inconvenience of the wired connection. While the launch library was described as "solid" by CNN, The Telegraph had some concerns about future first party software plans beyond the current offering. On Metacritic, out of 51 professional critic reviews, 14 were in the "Extremely positive" category, 33 in the "Positive" category, 4 in the "Mixed" category, and 0 in the "Negative" category.

After launch, reviews of the peripheral turned negative, with professional critics criticizing the lack of first-party games, as well as other issues, to sustain the launch momentum. In July 2023, Dave Meikleham from Tom's Guide wrote he "[had] big time buyer's remorse" after using the PSVR2 for several months. In March 2024, Isaiah Richard from Tech Times claim that the Sony is seeing unsold PSVR2 units piling up amidst upcoming games. In the same month, IGN published an article, suggesting that Sony seemed to have abandoned the PlayStation VR2. Bloomberg also reported that Sony paused the manufacturing of PlayStation VR2 due to lack of sales. In June 2024, Jay Peters from The Verge wrote that he "regret[s] buying the PSVR 2". Digital Trends' reporter stated his unit was "collecting dust". Android Central also claims that Sony has made deep cuts to funding for VR games, citing Sony's lack of care to PSVR2.

In January 2025, former PlayStation executive Shuhei Yoshida apologizes for being "wrong" about PS VR2, suggesting he believes the headset's market reception failed to meet his expectations.

== See also ==
- List of PlayStation VR2 games
