= Development of The Last of Us (video game) =

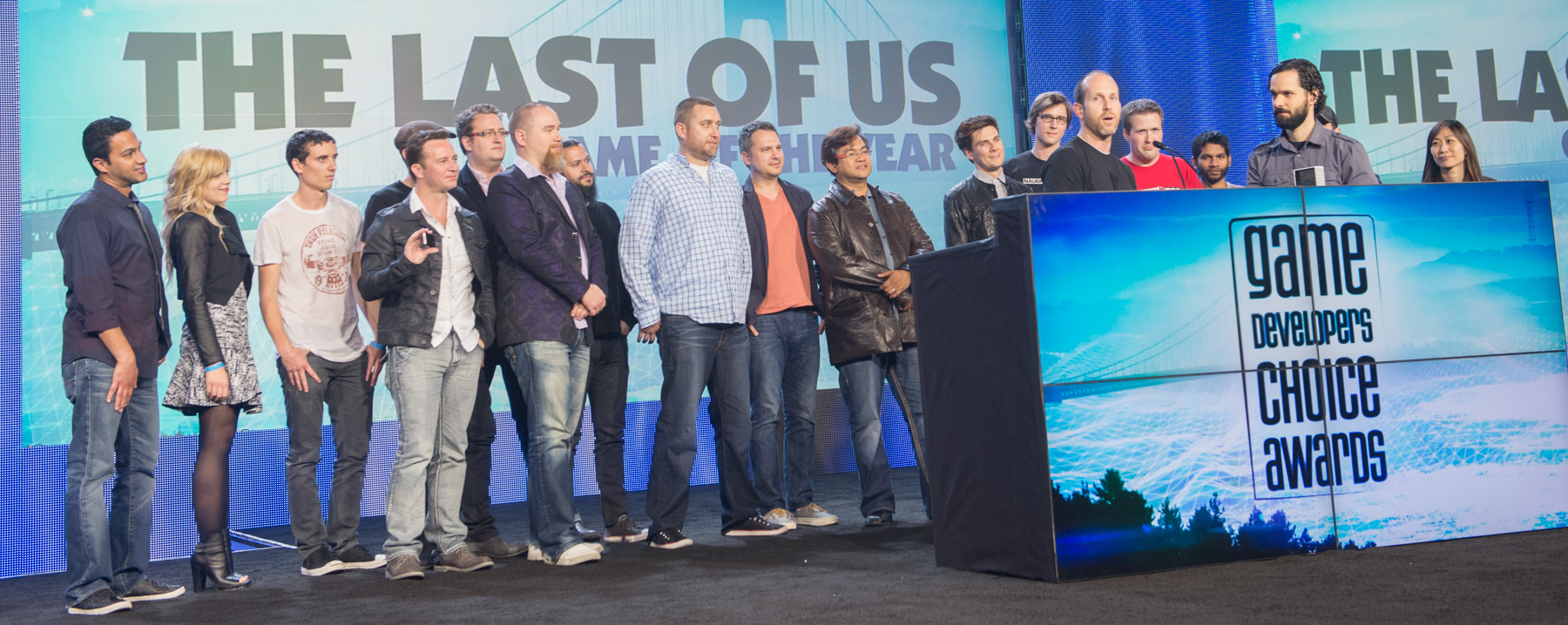
Some Naughty Dog developers accepting Game of the Year at the Game Developers Choice Awards

Naughty Dog began developing The Last of Us in 2009. Sony Computer Entertainment published the action-adventure game for PlayStation 3 on June 14, 2013. (Note: An enhanced version, titled The Last of Us Remastered, was released for PlayStation 4 on July 29, 2014. A remake, titled The Last of Us Part I, was released for PlayStation 5 on September 2, 2022, and for Windows on March 28, 2023.) The three-year development was led by game director Bruce Straley and creative director Neil Druckmann. In the game, players assume control of Joel, a middle-aged smuggler tasked with escorting a 14-year-old girl named Ellie across a post-apocalyptic United States in an attempt to create a potential cure against the world-ending infection to which Ellie is immune. Set 20 years after the outbreak has destroyed much of civilization, the game explores the possibility of the Cordyceps fungi infecting humans.

Though Ellie was initially intended to be Joel's daughter, the team found this to be too limiting in terms of further character development. The team chose Troy Baker and Ashley Johnson to portray Joel and Ellie, respectively. Providing both the voice and motion capture of the characters, Baker and Johnson assisted the team to develop the characters and help refine the story. The relationship between Joel and Ellie was the central focus of the game, and all other elements were developed around it. Various other characters were influenced by the story progression, ultimately becoming completely different from the initial vision.

The Last of Us features an original score composed by Argentine musician Gustavo Santaolalla. Known for his minimalist approach to composing, Santaolalla was contacted early in development. Naughty Dog took a similar minimalist approach to other elements of the game, including the action, sound design, and art design. In order to achieve the best work possible, the sound department began working early on the sound of the Infected. A similar direction was taken by the art department, whose designs influenced other elements of development. Naughty Dog overhauled their game engine for some elements, particularly lighting and animations.

The Last of Us was officially announced in 2011; it was heavily promoted and widely anticipated. Naughty Dog missed the original release date, delaying the game for further polishing. Naughty Dog marketed the game through video trailers and press demonstrations, announcing specific details about the game as development continued. Various special editions of the game were released, along with a comic book featuring characters from the game.

== Background and overview ==
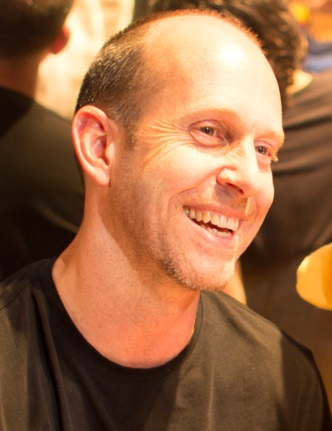
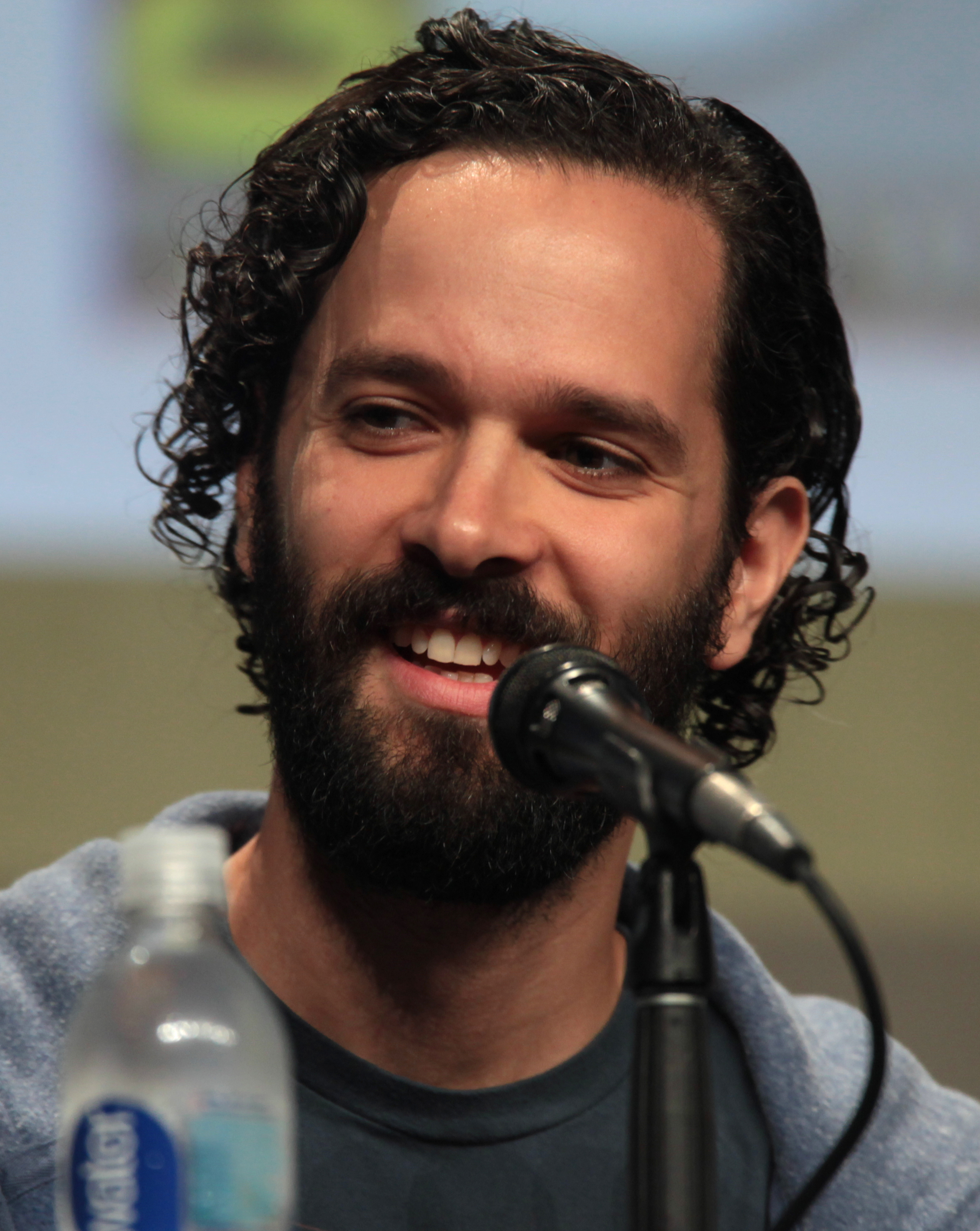
Bruce Straley (left) and Neil Druckmann (right) were chosen to lead development on The Last of Us, as game director and creative director, respectively.

Preliminary work on The Last of Us, under the codename "Project Thing" or "T1", began after the release of Uncharted 2: Among Thieves in October 2009. For the first time, developer Naughty Dog split into two teams to work on projects concurrently, with the first developing Uncharted 3: Drake's Deception (2011). Naughty Dog had attempted a dual team setup once before around the time Uncharted: Drake's Fortune (2007) was being developed in order to work on Jak and Daxter: The Lost Frontier (2009). This initial attempt failed due to the team having insufficient resources; by the time the company had released two Uncharted games, co-presidents Evan Wells and Christophe Balestra felt the team was experienced enough to try again.

Being a company integrated in a two-team setup, Naughty Dog initially felt it wise to work on a new entry to the Jak and Daxter series: creative director Neil Druckmann thought to work on an established franchise while testing out the setup, as he did not want the team to take on too many challenges at once, and Wells noticed that consumer demand was high for another entry in the series, with the second team positing the idea that they could apply their experience from Uncharted to Jak and Daxter. Wells said that their idea to apply aspects of Uncharted to the prospective Jak and Daxter game were making it entirely different to the spirit of the series, and felt the fans would not be pleased with this direction. The team, questioning their motives for developing another Jak and Daxter entry, decided to develop an original intellectual property following a discussion with Wells. Bruce Straley, who was employed at Naughty Dog in March 1999, was selected to lead the project as game director based on his experience and his work on previous projects, while Druckmann, an employee since 2004 and lead game designer on Uncharted 2, was chosen for his determination and talent for design about a year into the game's production.

== Story and setting ==
In 2003, Druckmann drew early sketches for a game pitch about a man and his surrogate daughter trekking across a broken United States. As a student at Carnegie Mellon University in 2004, he was tasked with creating a video game concept to present to film director George A. Romero, who would select a winner. Druckmann's idea was to merge the gameplay of Ico (2001) in a story set during a zombie apocalypse, like that of Romero's Night of the Living Dead (1968), with a lead character similar to John Hartigan from Sin City (1991–2000). The lead character, a police officer, would be tasked with protecting a young girl; however, due to the lead character's heart condition, players would often assume control of the young girl, reversing the roles. After the idea did not win, Druckmann pitched it as a six-issue comic book called The Turning, for which he completed the script, but it was turned down by an indie comic book publisher. He later revisited this idea when creating the story of The Last of Us. An early concept for the game was titled Mankind, in which the infection only spread to women; the story followed the journey of a man protecting the only immune woman to bring her to a lab to create a potential cure. The concept was soon scrapped, particularly after female Naughty Dog employees voiced their concerns, as it was deemed misogynistic. Druckmann studied narratives from the genre during development, including the film Road to Perdition (2002), which inspired the relationship between protagonists Joel and Ellie, particularly in Joel's attempts for Ellie to avoid becoming corrupted by violence.

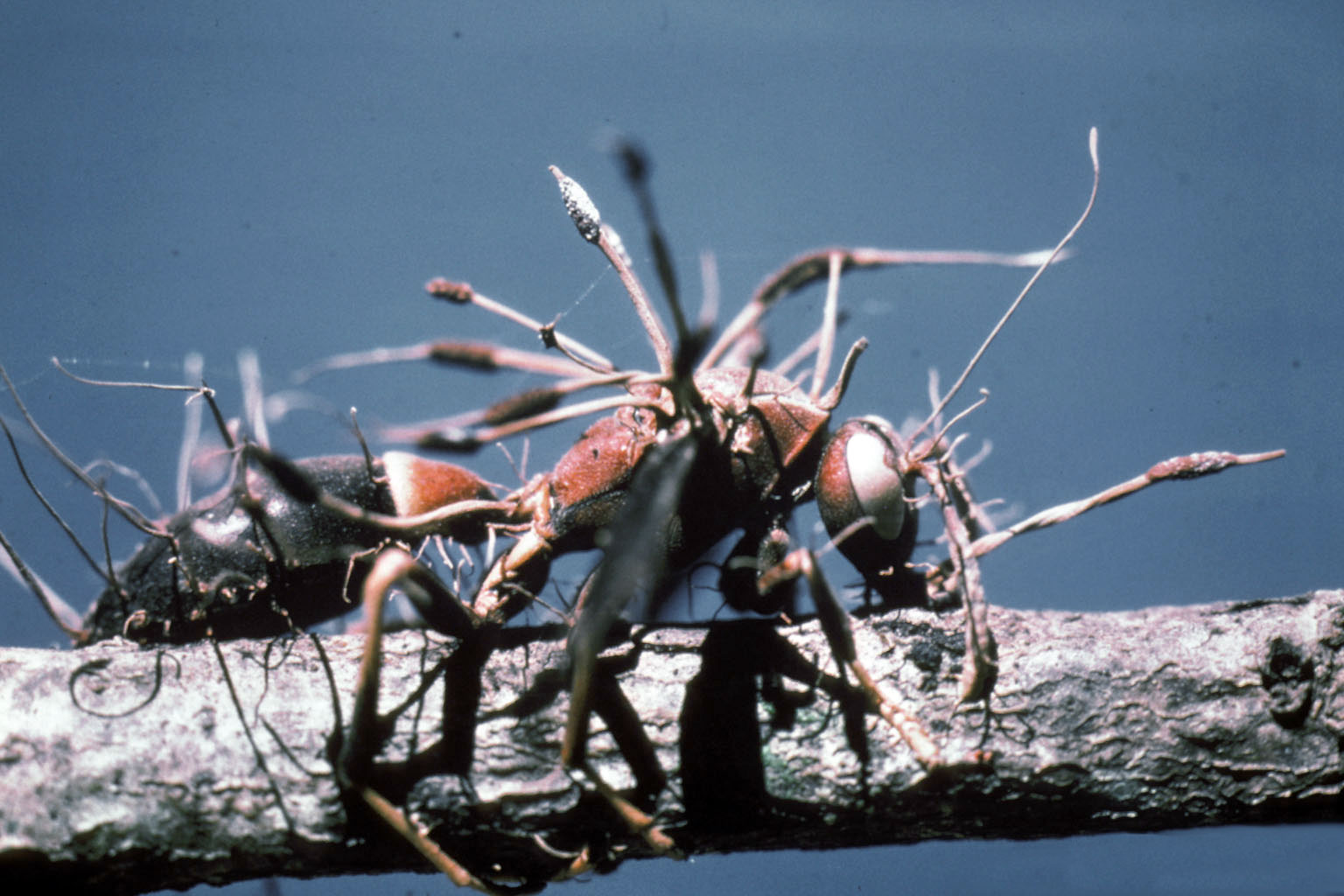
The game explores the concept of a human infection caused by the Cordyceps fungus, which primarily infects insects.

The Infected, a core concept of the game, were inspired by a segment of the BBC nature documentary Planet Earth (2006), which featured the Cordyceps fungi. Though the fungi mainly infect insects, the game explores the concept of the fungus evolving and infecting humans, and the direct results of an outbreak of this infection. The game does not directly explain the cause of the fungus; Straley attributed this to the team's focus on the characters, as opposed to the fungus. They preferred to explain the events through subtext, rather than explicitly explaining the cause of the infection. Straley compared the subtext included in The Last of Us to that of BioShock Infinite (2013). He felt that the latter had spawned various conversations within the industry, which he sees as a sign of a maturing industry. "I've seen enough good stories in books and film. Now I want to see them in video games", said Straley. The team used the concept of the Infected to force players to explore the limits of human perseverance. Throughout development, the team assured everyone that the Infected were strictly different from zombies.

In order to make the game as realistic as possible, the team conducted extensive research for the setting. Taking influences from Alan Weisman's The World Without Us (2007), Naughty Dog created a world that would force players to make decisions and utilize their limited supplies effectively. In his research, Druckmann found inspiration in real historical events; the 1918 Spanish flu pandemic illustrated the depths of self-protection and paranoia capable by humans under threat of extinction, while the polio epidemic of the 1880s demonstrated the influences of socioeconomic classes when assigning blame in a great disaster. Druckmann and Straley have also cited Amy Hennig's "perfectionist mindset" and dedication to characters as an inspiration for the game's story; Hennig worked as head writer and creative director on the Uncharted series (2007–11). The team also found creative similarity in Gravity (2013), in terms of the game's simplicity and intensity.

When writing the script, Druckmann tried to exclude "fancy dialogue", keeping everything "short and natural". Community strategist Eric Monacelli has stated that the narrative's overarching themes are "love, loyalty and redemption", assuring their importance in the game, and fellow community strategist Arne Meyer said that the game's violence fit the narrative. Straley reiterated this, stating "you have to have the dark to have the light". Game designer Anthony Newman stated that the game deals with how people would react under pressure in extreme situations, which is represented through the violence and combat. The team felt interested in the story's dark themes juxtaposed against the "beautiful" settings.

The motif that "life goes on" is regularly presented throughout the game, generally illustrated by nature and the environment; in a later scene, Joel and Ellie discover a herd of giraffes, seen as hope for the characters.

A major motif present throughout the game is that "life goes on". A scene near the end of the game, in which Joel and Ellie discover a herd of giraffes, is referenced by many journalists as the denouement of this motif. Concept artist John Sweeney wrote that the scene was designed to "reignite [Ellie's] lust for life", triggering her curiosity and forgetting the surrounding struggle and death. The sequence, borne from the idea of wild animals roaming outside of the quarantine zone, originally involved a herd of deer and later a zebra, but giraffes were settled on for their beauty and majesty. Sweeney stated that they were "the most remarkable thing Ellie could possibly encounter". Druckmann felt that the sequence "works because of all the horrible things" encountered beforehand. IGN's Lucy O'Brien wrote that the scene acts as a reminder of Ellie's age, despite having been outwardly "stripped of any semblance of a childhood", and Kotaku writer Kirk Hamilton found the scene to be a resemblance of hope for Ellie, having clearly suffered post-traumatic stress following her encounter with David. Druckmann felt it offered a fleeting "glimpse" of Ellie before the changing encounter with David, with that part of her being gone forever once the herd leaves.

In regards to the ending, the team intended for it to be open to interpretation. Straley has stated that it's "not your typical ending, but it's still a nice resolution". Both he and Druckmann stated their frustration when players told them they wanted a choice at the game's ending; Straley said that most of these players told him they would have chosen the same ending as the game anyway. The original ending would have seen Ellie killing Tess at a point in development where she was posited as the main antagonist, with Ellie having killed nobody before other than infected to save Joel from being tortured by Tess. The team changed this and Ellie's character arc, as it would have made her disengaged from combat and boring, instead shifting the focus of her arc to center around the impacts of violence on her throughout the story.

While the game's focus testers hated the final ending, suggesting alternative methods, Druckmann continued with it; when the game's music and gameplay became closer to completion, the focus testers began appreciating the ending more. Druckmann enjoyed the ambiguity of Ellie's response to Joel's lie about killing the Fireflies—he had considered a happier resolution where the two settle with a group attempting to re-establish civilization in San Francisco, but said this was dishonest and would let them off too easily considering that Ellie would have seen past Joel's bad lying, thus making this unrealistic and warranting the unclear route. When discussing the ending, VentureBeat writer Dean Takahashi referenced the quote "Whoever saves one life saves the world entire", from Schindler's List (1993), highlighting its inaccuracy: "You save a life and doom the whole world", he wrote.

== Character development ==
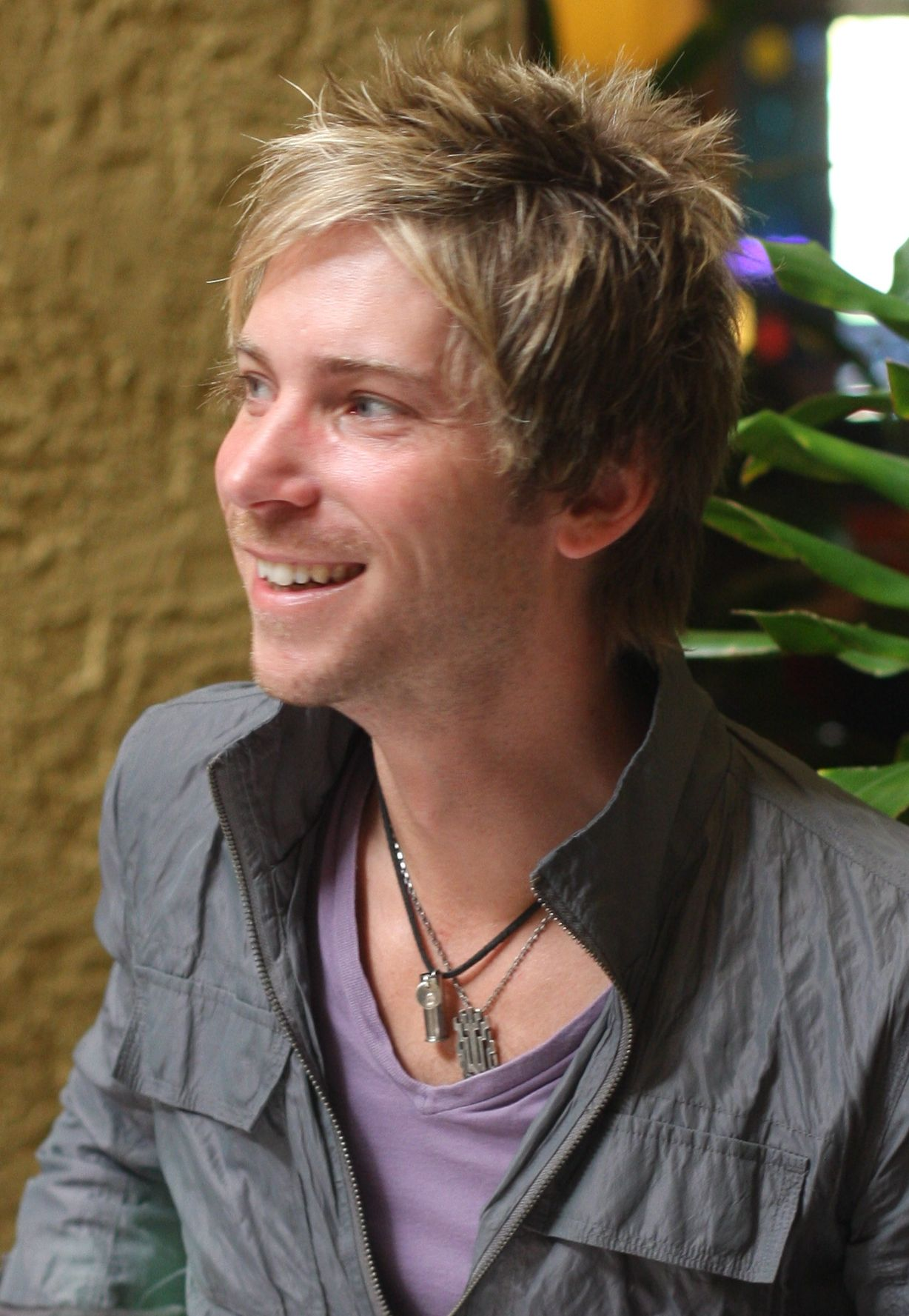
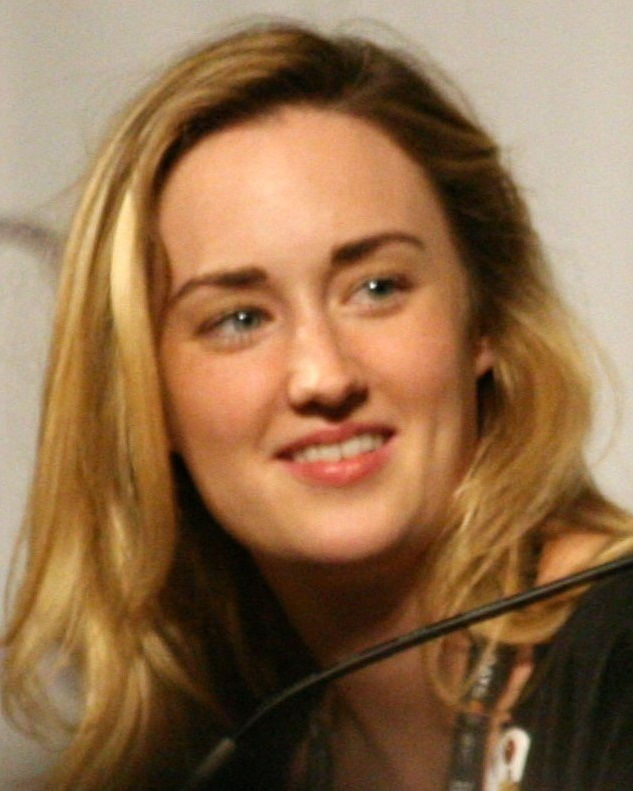
Troy Baker (left) and Ashley Johnson (right) portrayed Joel and Ellie, respectively.

Joel and Ellie are voiced by Troy Baker and Ashley Johnson, respectively. Their performances were mostly recorded using motion capture technology; approximately 85% of the game's animations were recorded using motion capture, with remaining audio elements recorded later in a studio. Gordon Hunt, who had worked on the Uncharted games, was originally employed as the motion capture director; when the team realized the game required a different tone, they began looking for a new director. As Druckmann was researching the facets of the directorial position in preparing for interviews, he realized he could take the position himself, and was approved to do so.

Though the team quickly felt that Johnson fit the role of Ellie, they spent more time selecting the actor of Joel, as the chemistry between the two characters was imperative to the game. After Baker and Johnson played alongside each other, the team realized that the former perfectly fit the role of Joel, despite the actor's young age. Druckmann attributed Baker's voice and movement to the team's choice of casting him. Baker and Johnson contributed greatly to the development of the characters. For example, Baker convinced Druckmann that Joel would care for Tess due to his loneliness, and Johnson convinced Druckmann to re-write the character of Ellie in a stronger and more defensive manner. Some of the dialogue between the duo was improvised by the actors; Druckmann attributed this to the fact that the script included an unnecessary number of lines during gameplay sections, and he allowed the actors to choose what they felt was necessary. The characters of Joel and Ellie were the basis of the game; the development between the characters was established first, and the game's other concepts followed.

From the beginning of development, the team intended for The Last of Us to feature dual protagonists with strong individual story arcs. During the Winter segment of the game, players assume control of Ellie. The developers ensured that this change was kept secretive prior to the game's release, to surprise players; they did the same with Ellie's immunity, as well as with the game's prologue, where players assume control of Joel's daughter Sarah. The change of control from Joel to Ellie signifies a change in the role of the protector, echoing Druckmann's previous ideas as a student. The character interactions were inspired by the relationship between Nathan Drake and Tenzin in Uncharted 2: Among Thieves, in turn inspired by the video game Ico. Druckmann and Straley remembered how Drake and Tenzin built a strong rapport over a short time, and with The Last of Us, they "challenged" themselves to create a bond between two characters that would grow over the course of an entire game, not just one level. The game's protagonists represent the two eras that are shown in the game; Joel represents the world before the outbreak, having spent most of his life during this period, while Ellie represents the world after the outbreak, as she was born in the post-apocalyptic world. While the former is emotionally damaged due to the loss that he has experienced, the latter maintains an optimistic view of life, having become familiar to the damaged world; spending time with each other saw these qualities overlapping, with Joel become more lively, and Ellie learning more survival skills.

Though Druckmann initially wrote the character of Joel using inspiration from Josh Brolin's portrayal of Llewelyn Moss in No Country for Old Men (2007), which he saw as "very quiet, very cool under pressure", Baker's interpretation of Joel as a more emotional person evolved the character in a different way. Ultimately, the narrative became an exploration of how willing a father is to save a child; initially, Joel is willing to sacrifice himself, before evolving where he is willing to sacrifice his friends, until finally feeling that he would sacrifice all of humanity in order to save Ellie. Druckmann felt that players, specifically parents, would be able to relate to Joel's character and his bonding with Ellie. Baker believes that Joel discovers morality throughout the game's narrative, working out the difference between loss and sacrifice, and his true personality begins to show. When auditioning for the role, Baker read a phrase on the character sheet that stated Joel had "few moral lines left to cross", which became the "anchor point" to the character for him. Baker found great difficulty in filming the game's prologue, which features scenes with Joel and his daughter Sarah, portrayed by Hana Hayes. Upon later viewing of the first day of footage from the scene, Druckmann felt that it could still be improved. When filming the scene again, Druckmann explained to Baker how to perform it, and felt that it was the best take upon doing so. Though Baker initially found the take too "mechanical", he retroactively realized that he had been previously trying to impress audiences by his acting, and that it was "not what the scene needed".

When portraying Ellie, Johnson faced challenges in performing scenes that made her feel uncomfortable. "There were some days when we would shoot things that even at my age made me feel a little uncomfortable", Johnson described. Johnson feels that video games rarely feature strong female characters such as Ellie, and expressed her excitement to portray the role for this reason. When questioned about the inspiration for Ellie as a gameplay feature, Druckmann recalled when he and Straley were brainstorming ideas for Uncharted 2: Among Thieves and created a mute character who would summon the player to follow them, creating a "beautiful" relationship through gameplay alone. Though this concept was never included in the final game, the idea was raised when the team were discussing a new project, ultimately inspiring Ellie. Druckmann also felt inspired by the wars that took place in Syria and Afghanistan when creating Ellie; he felt that conflict was a familiarity to the children in those countries, which is similar to Ellie's view.

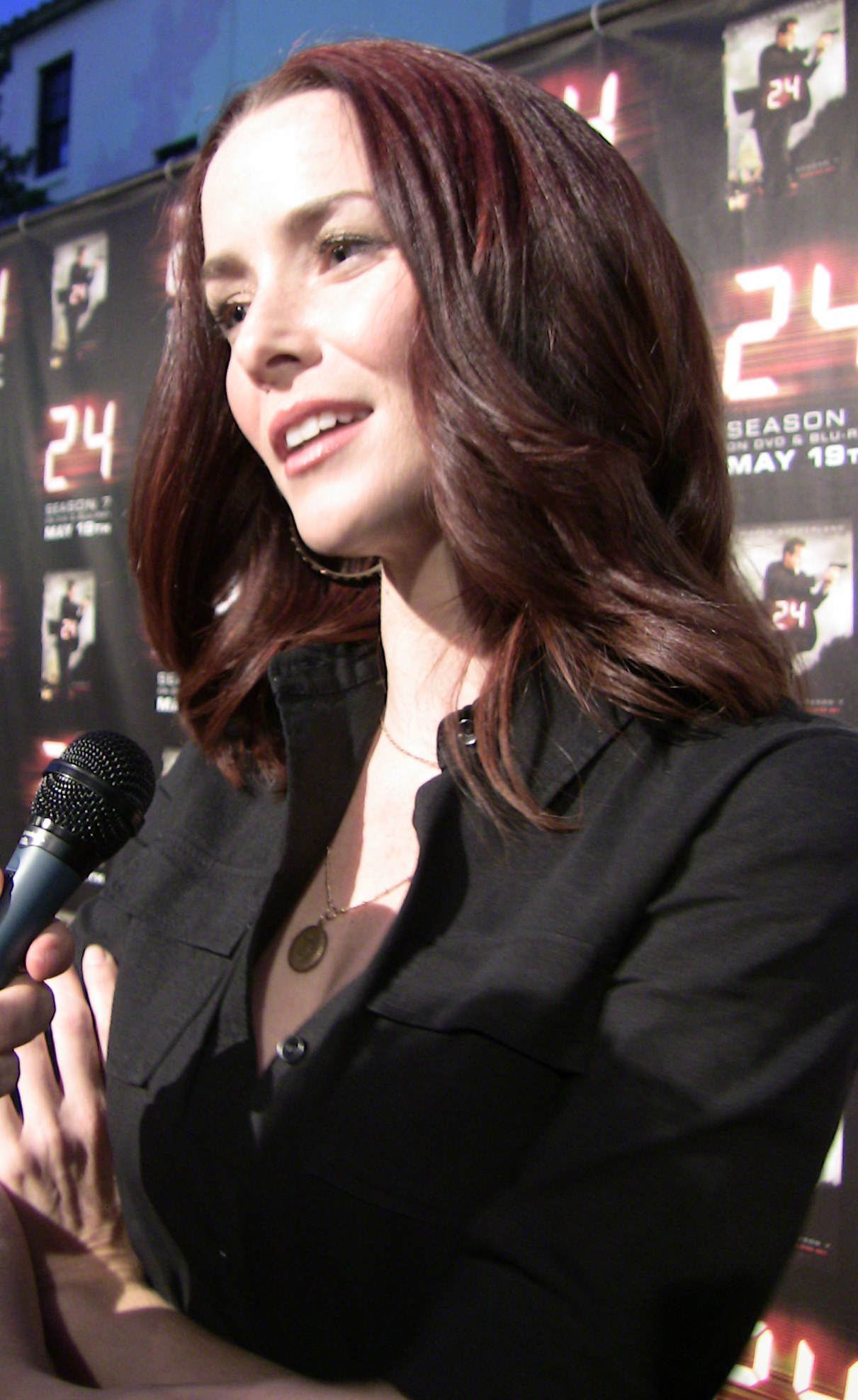
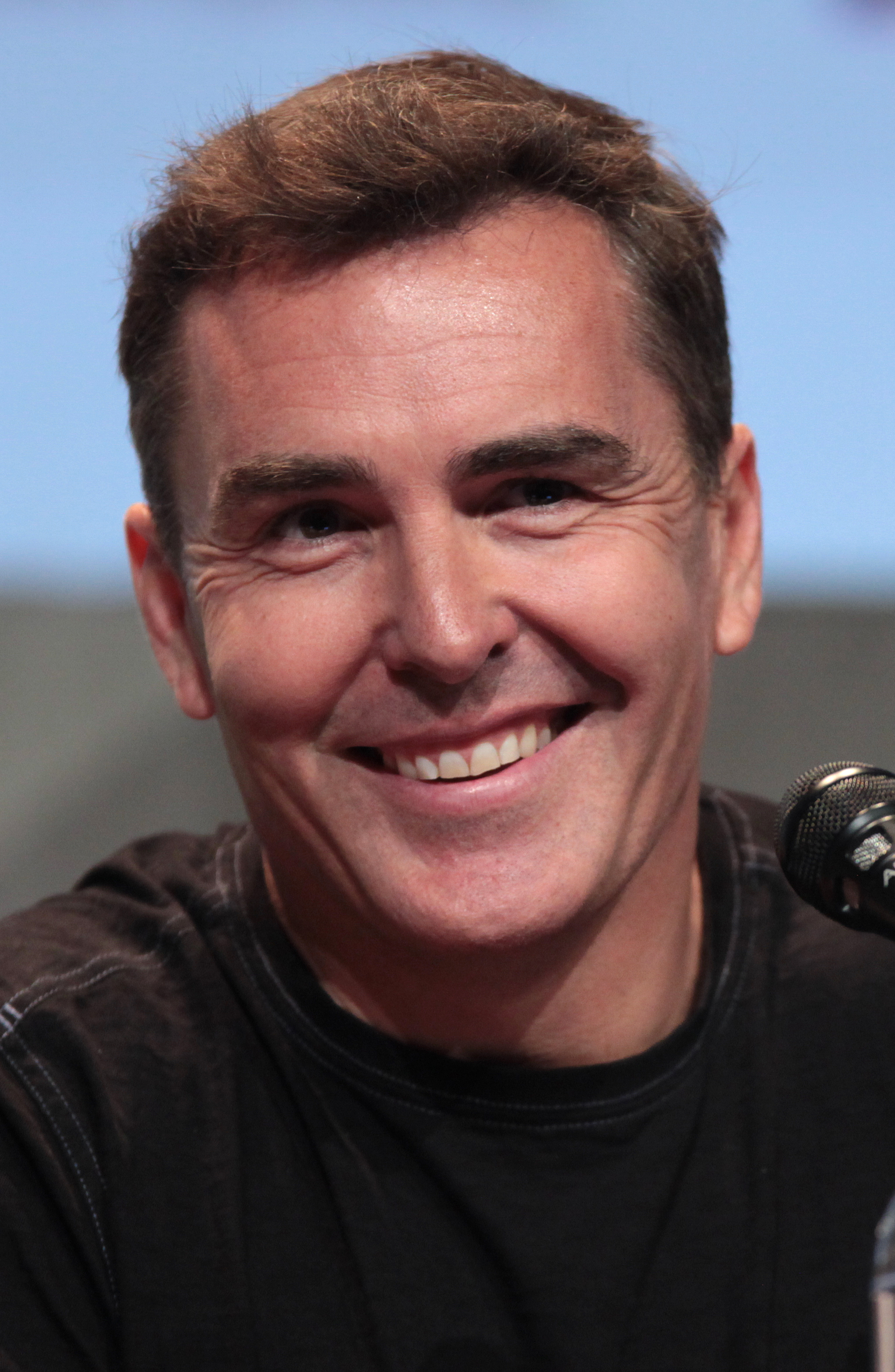
Annie Wersching (left) and Nolan North (right) portrayed Tess and David, respectively.

The character of Tess was originally intended to be featured as the main antagonist of The Last of Us, pursuing Joel for a year before a final confrontation in which she is killed by Ellie. However, the team found it difficult to believe that Tess would dispute with Joel and pursue him for a year; this was solved by significantly adjusting the story. Actress Annie Wersching was impressed by the script and Druckmann's ability to write unique female characters. Druckmann initially left the sexuality of Bill vague in the script, but was inspired at the script read-through to alter a few lines to further reflect Bill's sexuality. To make Bill interesting, Druckmann explored the concept of contradictory statements; while Bill states that becoming attached to people will lower chances of survival, it is revealed that he had a partner that he really cared for. Veteran voice actor Nolan North, who portrays protagonist Nathan Drake in Naughty Dog's Uncharted series, was chosen to play the role of David in the game. To portray the character, North approached his personality from multiple perspectives, viewing David as a "survivor". North empathized with David, stating that most of David's actions were understandable when considering the apocalyptic situation. He felt that David was initially attempting to protect Ellie, who was viewed as a "glimmer of hope".

The team felt that the post-apocalyptic world and the survival horror genre gave them the opportunity to better develop the characters. Taking inspiration from their work on the Uncharted games, the team used their knowledge of paralleling characters with the conflict in both gameplay and stories when developing The Last of Us. They also took inspiration from the books The Road (2006) and City of Thieves (2008), and the film No Country for Old Men, noting that they all include memorable characters and using this as a point of inspiration. "[W]e can make you as a player feel more of what it's truly like to exist inside of a world where every bullet counts and each step you take is a conscious choice that's going to make or break your existence", said Straley. The team also felt that the "pressures of the world" allowed them to better develop their characters. They felt that the pressure forced the characters to make interesting decisions, allowing better development.

== Technical and gameplay development ==
For The Last of Us, the team had to create new engines to satisfy their needs. The artificial intelligence (AI) was created to coordinate with players on an intimate level, as opposed to the action elements from their previous projects; the addition of Ellie as AI was also a major contributor to the engine. The team intentionally added a feature in which Ellie remains close to Joel, in order to avoid being conceived as a "burden". Programmer Max Dyckhoff stated that, when working on Ellie as AI, he tried to imagine her experiences throughout the game's events, in an attempt to achieve realism. The enemy AI, considered one of the most important features of the game, was developed to make random choices; they study their surroundings, finding tactics to attack the player. This uniqueness to gameplay was a factor into the attempt at making players feel emotions towards the enemies. The lighting engine was also re-created to incorporate soft light, in which the sunlight seeps in through spaces and reflects off surfaces. The team found great difficulty in developing the gameplay for The Last of Us, as they felt that every mechanic required thorough analysis. "You feel a lot of pressure to add things to make it 'more fun' and it gets super difficult to keep those out sometimes", Druckmann said. In The Last of Us, the weapon that players have equipped change the behavior of the human NPCs. In addition, the stealth system was intentionally developed to offer a sense of desperation, to make players feel the same.

There are multiple features omitted from the game that the team considered typical of most video games, such as boss fights. A traditional cover system was excluded for the game as the team wanted players to constantly move around. The team also attempted to cause players to feel as though they are lacking, particularly in the supplies that they collect. "You're not building yourself into a tank", said Straley. This also motivated many of the design decisions of the gameplay, such as the weightlessness of the animations, and the melee combat mechanic. To further add to the realism, the team developed the game's combat mechanic in a way that forces players to spend more time planning. They also wanted players to be forced to retreat from combat after alerting the Infected, despite their belief that retreating is the "anti-video game play mechanic". The combat mechanic was developed to feel intense, intentionally moving the camera closer to players, in order for them to "feel every strike". The team felt that the game forces players to make difficult choices, in terms of combat, stealth and resource management, allowing them to understand the decisions made by the characters.

Many gameplay elements from the Uncharted games were excluded from The Last of Us due to the nature of the latter. The team made Joel more "grounded and less nimble" than Uncharted's Nathan Drake. The camera angle and melee system were also altered to fit with the team's intention of the game. Some gameplay features were inspired by the game's post-apocalyptic nature; for example, a task involving spatial problem solving was inspired by the prior inclusion of a strong water current that obstructs players. The team also felt that No Country for Old Men inspired them in terms of the minimalism, wanting to "get more intimate" with the gameplay scenarios. The team decided to include various optional paths for players to use. While at one point they felt that the additional content was useless, the team eventually felt that it feels "natural and organic". Game designer Ricky Cambier said the emotional weight of Joel and Ellie's relationship needed to be balanced with the tension of the world's issues, stating that they "wanted to take the character building and interaction" of Ico and "blend it with the tension and action of Resident Evil 4".

The game's online multiplayer mode features three game types; the team opted to limit the number of game types, as opposed to creating an abundance of them, in order to create a "deeper game experience". The multiplayer mode was inspired by the combat encounters of the single-player campaign; the team aimed to recreate the slow pace of the encounters, and maintain a similar crafting system. This was achieved by making weapons lethal, and placing crafting items in strategic locations across the map, which was intended to result in stealthy gameplay and careful selection of ambushes. It also emphasized the stealth and teamwork elements of the mode. Lead multiplayer designer Erin Daly felt that the slower pace was difficult to achieve in a multiplayer environment, stating that "in most multiplayer shooters ... players sprint around at high speeds and spray bullets at anything that moves". In addition, the multiplayer was designed to support different play styles; while some players prefer to act as sniper, others opt to perform as support. Adding a revive system—when players take a significant amount of damage, they slowly crawl around while bleeding to death—created a large consequence to death; losing team members is intended to be a significant loss to players. When designing the multiplayer, the team wanted players to have very little information regarding the location of the threats, while still giving a minor indication of the location. Daly attributed this to the importance of threat detection in a competitive experience, particularly when the lethality is high. The in-game purchasing system was designed to be akin to a role-playing game by allocating a set of spendable points.

Ashley Johnson's facial expressions from the motion capture sessions (left) were later used by the team to animate Ellie for the game's cutscenes (right). This process was used for all characters.

For the game's character sculpting and rigging, the team introduced various new elements that were not used in their previous games. Lead character technical director Judd Simantov found that the creation of the faces was the most challenging, in terms of hardware. For the faces, the team used joint-based facial rigs, with some blend-shape correctives. To retain the shape of the face and avoid awkward movement, the faces were rigged with the mouth open and eyes slightly closed. The faces were also based on the Facial Action Coding System, allowing for an anatomical-based approach. The use of a higher mesh density also allowed more volumes and creasing in the shape of the face, creating cleaner silhouettes and shapes and giving enough geometry to sculpt correctives. In an attempt to add subtle features, pupil dilation was added to the character models. For the bodies, the team edited the character movements from Uncharted 2, softening some joint alignment. The animation of carpal joints was also added for the game, allowing more dynamic hand shapes, and flexibility. Another subtle addition was the arm mover controls, allowing minor editing on the arms; though this feature was previously available, it was opened up to the animators for The Last of Us. A muscle system was also added, adding muscle shells that bulge, based on attachment joint distance; the muscle system, written in Maya within a few days, works in real time. To solve an issue in which body movement resulted in awkward movement of clothing, runtime helpers were implemented. A total of 326 joints were used in the full character model, with 98 of these in the face; 85 of these are runtime driven, while 241 are locked into animation.

The various iterations that the user interface design underwent throughout development

The user interface design (UI) for The Last of Us underwent various different iterations throughout development. User interface designer Alexandria Neonakis originally intended to integrate the weapon upgrade system into the weapon slotting system, in order to constantly remind players to upgrade their weapons. Upon further iterations, Neonakis discovered that this integration resulted in a cluttered interface. Ultimately, it was decided that the upgrade system would be integrated in the form of upgrade benches, occasionally found throughout the game's world; this also solved another problem that Neonakis witnessed, in which players would upgrade to the lowest possible option, as opposed to saving parts for the higher options. Once it was decided to split the upgrade and slotting systems, the initial design was to select the weapons from a circle. This design, eventually considered "clunky and slow", was replaced in preference of a list system. Neonakis has identified that the main problem with the list design was that it forced players to focus on navigating through menus during intense combat. This led to the final design, which allows players to swap and slot weapons in the same menu. To integrate the UI into the game, Neonakis separated the individual elements and changed their format. User interface programmer Paul Burg provided Neonakis with tools to move elements using their coordinates. All animated transitions were hard coded, which led to difficulty in creating smooth transitions. "This was tedious and at times incredibly frustrating, but it also meant that we all had to be pretty creative in how things were designed", Neonakis said. The game's crafting system was implemented into immediate gameplay, in order for players to feel involved. "We needed to make it streamlined and fast enough that you felt like you could take just that moment and be able to craft that thing that's going to mean your survival in the next thirty seconds, or your failure to survive", lead game designer Jacob Minkoff said.

== Art design ==
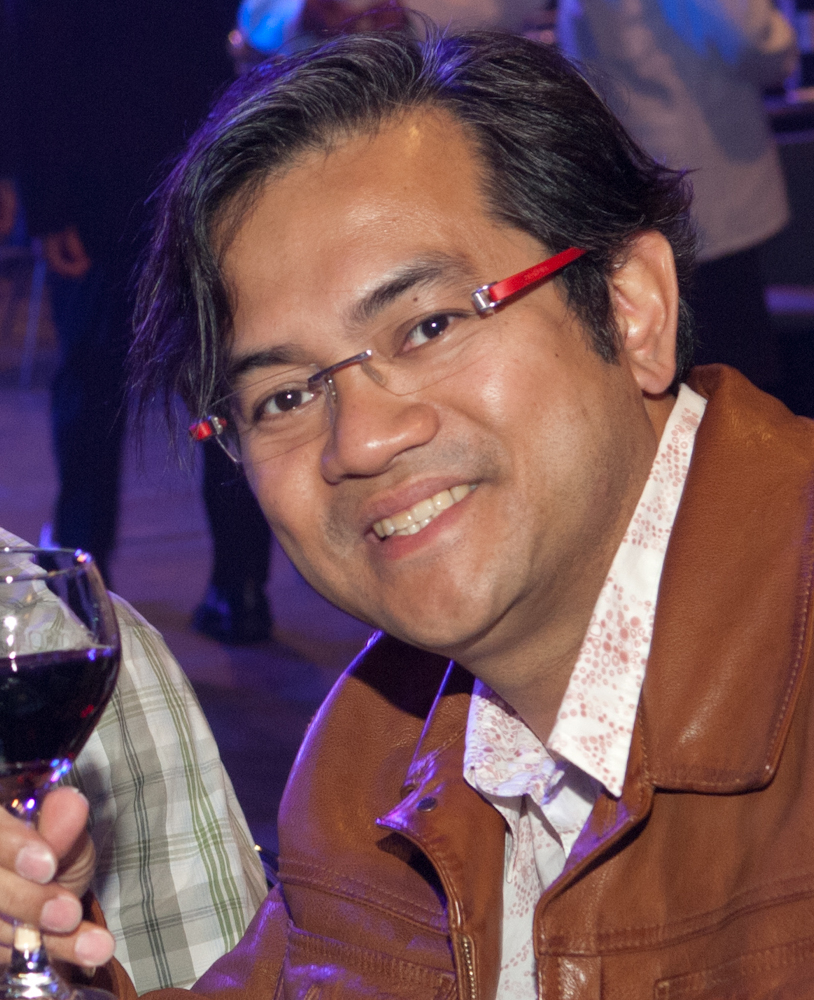
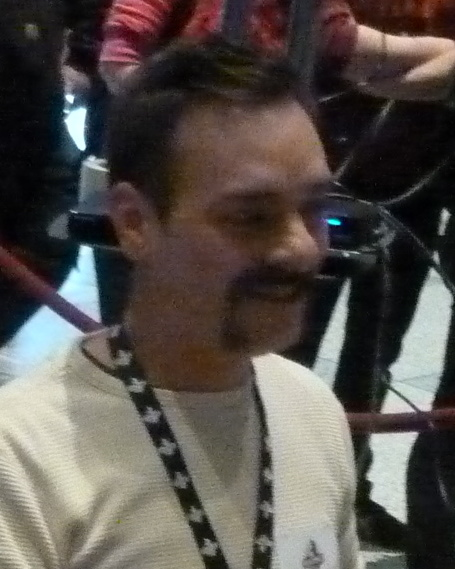
Erick Pangilinan (left) and Nate Wells (right) acted as the game's art directors.

When designing the game from an artistic viewpoint, the team took various pieces of work as inspiration. Robert Polidori's photographs of Lower Ninth Ward following Hurricane Katrina were used as a reference point when designing the flooded areas of Pittsburgh. "[Polidori] did these amazingly beautiful, horrific photos... it's not just decay and rot and post-apocalyptic grey, it's a human world that we're playing with when we portray this destruction", said Straley. The concept of post-apocalyptic environments was considered a "starting point" for the artists. The art team also strived to achieve realism within every piece of art. Straley explained that the artists "would be like, I'm going to make this the most awesome fucking wall ever", in terms of creating attractive environments. The art department were forced to fight for things that they wished to include, due to the high demand during development. Ultimately, the team settled on a balance between simplicity and detail; while Straley and Druckmann preferred the former, the art team preferred the latter. The artistic composition of the game's locations was also a feature strongly focused on, in order to evoke varying emotions from players. In the final weeks of development, roles from the art department were undertaken by other members of the team; for example, Straley hand-arranged the texts on the game's training screens, a task that lead artist Nate Wells found unusual. "I have never even heard of a game director doing that! That's like... an intern task", Wells said.

When creating the look of the Infected, the art team cycled through various iterations, focusing on "organic" and "natural" as keywords. Some early ideas included the Infected looking like aliens or zombies. The final design was chosen when lead character artist Michael Knowland incorporated images of diseases and fungal growth onto a human. He expressed the difficulty in changing the art from 2D to 3D, which would allow viewing from different angles. The process involved sending completed concept art to the lighting and visual effects artists, who re-created the art within the game's engine. Due to the lack of artificial light sources in the game's world, the team was forced to work with natural light. To achieve high quality lighting, they used lightmaps. The use of lightmaps led to various problems, such as the discontinuities in the lighting; this was fixed by slightly modifying the texel intensities. When characters were added to scenes, they initially looked out of place; the addition of a shadow generally fixed this.

The game's opening credits were directed by Kevin Joelson and designed by Henry Hobson. Original concept development for the opening sequence began in late January 2013, and full production began in March 2013. Though the team initially intended for the game to omit opening credits, they were later added to "bridge the gap" between the game's prologue and the following scene, a cut that was previously deemed "too sudden" without opening credits. San Diego Studio produced the opening credits, using time-lapse photography to record the growth of fungus over multiple days; only the spores at the end of the credits are computer-generated. The sequence was inspired by Planet Earth, which featured similar concepts.

== Music and sound production ==
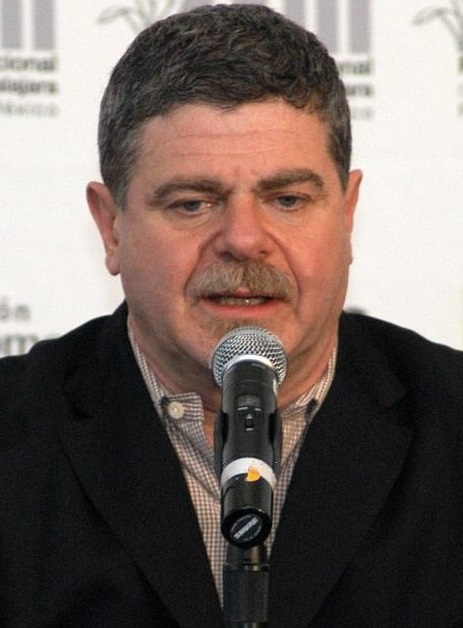
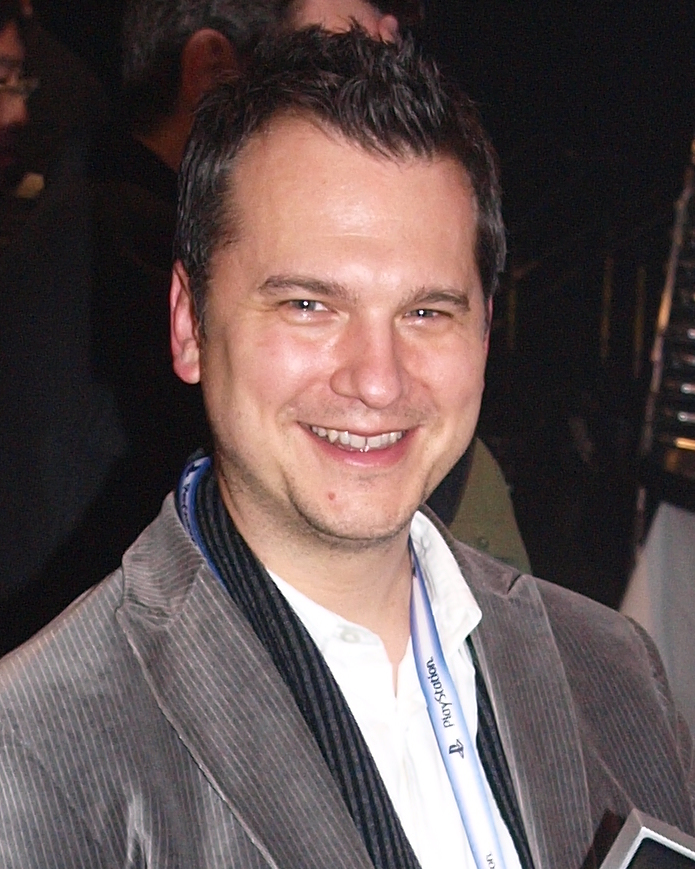
Gustavo Santaolalla (left) composed the score for The Last of Us, and Phillip Kovats (right) worked as audio lead.

Throughout development, Druckmann and Straley had been compiling various musical tracks that they found inspirational. When searching for a composer to work on the game's music, they realised that many of the compiled tracks were composed by Gustavo Santaolalla. Straley described Santaolalla's music as "organic instrumentation, minimalist, dissonance and resonance with the sounds". The composer agreed to work on the game's soundtrack when contacted by Sony. Santaolalla was brought to the studio and was shown an early version of the game's first trailer and a full description of the game's plot; Druckmann remembers the composer's first words to them were "I want to be a part of this. Whatever it takes, I want to write for this". After hearing the game's pitch, Santaolalla was excited to work on the game; he previously wanted to work on video games, but refused to work on those without a focus on story and characters.

Due to Santaolalla's stance on composing music—he lacks knowledge in reading and writing sheet music, preferring to simply record—he began working on The Last of Us early in development. To give Santaolalla a point to base his music, Druckmann simply told him about the story and themes, as opposed to giving specific instructions on composing; Santaolalla appreciated this freedom, feeling it assisted in the composing. To compose, Santaolalla felt the need to "go into some more dark place, more textural and not necessarily melodic". To challenge himself, Santaolalla used a variety of unique instruments he was unfamiliar with, giving a sense of danger and innocence. For The Last of Us, he used a detuned guitar, producing deep noise. To produce unique tunes, Santaolalla recorded in various rooms, including a bathroom and kitchen. The team wanted the game's AI to affect the music. They also tried to make the music evoke a reaction from the player, as their familiarization with the sounds would trigger a previous emotion that they felt. Music manager Jonathan Mayer felt that the game's action music was atypical of action music in other games, stating that it's "relatively low-key", and that taking it out of context changes the immediate reaction to it. The game's theme, "The Last of Us", was the first piece of music that the team received, and they were very impressed.

The sound design team began working on the game early in development, in order to achieve the best results; they immediately realized that it would be challenging. Early in development, Druckmann told the sound team to "make it subtle", and underplay ideas. Audio lead Phillip Kovats was excited to completely create all sounds; no sounds were carried across from previous games. The team looked at ways to create sounds from a naturalistic point-of-view, and how to introduce minimalism into a game. By doing so, they found that it added feelings of tension, loss and hope, and that the game appeared to be a typical "action game" without the minimalism approach. They used a high dynamic range, allowing them the opportunity to inform players on tactical information, and locations to explore. The game's sound design was created to reflect a more "grounded" and subtle mood than Uncharted, particularly focusing on the lack of sound. Taking inspiration from No Country for Old Men, the team attempted to "do more with less"; Kovats said that the team was trying to tell a story by "going for a reductive quality". Straley stated that the audio is vital to some scenes in the game; "It's more about the psychology of what's happening on the audioscape than what you're seeing", he stated. He felt that this decision allowed a more impactful and meaningful effect with sound occurred. The sound team also attempted to portray the game's dark themes through sound. The team felt that it was important to let sounds play for as long as possible in the game, drawing tension. The team used a propagation technique to help players determine the exact locations of enemies, using this as a tactical advantage. This system, created by the team at Naughty Dog, is processed at random in the game engine. For the game's audio, the engine throws out 1500–2500 ray casts per frame; though most games avoid this, the game's engine allowed it to work. The team spent a lot of time recording sounds for the game, namely doors, and rusty metal. Sound designer Neil Uchitel traveled to Rio de Janeiro, discovering locations to record sounds; he recorded chickens, which were used in the game as the sounds of rats. The team continued to add and change the game's sounds until the end of development.

Clicker sound effect
The development of the sound made by Clickers. The first sound, performed by voice actress Misty Lee, inspired the final sound effect implemented in the game.

To create the sound of the Clickers, the third stage of the Infected, the team found inspiration from a report on the journalism show 20/20 (1978–present) about blind children using clicking noises to communicate. "We liked the idea of taking this benign sound and attributing it to something really scary", said Druckmann. In addition, the team wanted to reflect the creature's feeling of pain and suffering, attempting to balance it with a sense of creepiness. The sound team created the sound of the Clicker first, realizing early that it was the most challenging. To create the sound, they hired voice actors to perform their renditions. When voice actress Misty Lee provided her own rendition, a noise that Kovats described as originating in the "back of the throat", Kovats and senior sound designer Derrick Espino agreed that it was what they wanted. Kovats then emulated the sound to feature in the game.

== Remastered ==
In March 2014, information concerning a release of The Last of Us on PlayStation 4 was leaked. This was followed by the appearance of the game, titled The Last of Us Remastered on the PlayStation Store on April 9, 2014; Naughty Dog announced the game on the same day. This enhanced version of the game features an increased draw distance, character models of higher resolution, improved lighting and shadows, and an upgraded combat mechanic. It runs a native 1080p resolution at 60 frames per second, with the option to lock the game at 30 frames per second. At E3 2014, Sony announced that the game would be released on July 29, 2014. Some of the downloadable content from The Last of Us is bundled with Remastered, including Left Behind and some multiplayer maps, while others require a separate purchase.

In Remastered, character textures were increased by a factor of four, shadows were doubled and a new lighting process was implemented. The motion blur when turning the camera, used to hide slower loading textures, was reduced, and the game's environments look "crisper". In addition, new settings were introduced to allow players to customize the game's audio channels, and the loading times were reduced, due to the game streaming from the hard drive as opposed to the disc. One of the biggest developmental challenges was fitting all content onto one Blu-ray Disc. The changing of the in-game textures, and the inclusion of Left Behind, were the cause for this difficulty. According to lead developer Christian Gyrling, Remastered "looked broken up until a week before shipping".

Development on Remastered began shortly following the release of The Last of Us in June 2013. Though initially under light development, the team began working harder on Remastered when they saw the demand for it; work on the game's code did not begin until a larger team was introduced to Remastered in February 2014. As development on the original game ended, the programmers expected that the game would be ported to the PlayStation 4, but planning and preparation did not begin until The Last of Us had launched. The team aimed at creating a "true" remaster, maintaining the "same core experience" and not changing any large story or gameplay elements. For the game's frame rate, the team was initially split, with some preferring 30 frames per second rather than 60; when the game was running at the latter, the whole team became convinced. The team that worked on Remastered was significantly smaller than the team for The Last of Us; in particular, the team did not include any designers, which led to various design issues remaining from the original game. Druckmann attributed this to the fact that Remastered was developed as a recreation of the original, altering only technical and graphical aspects.

== Remake ==
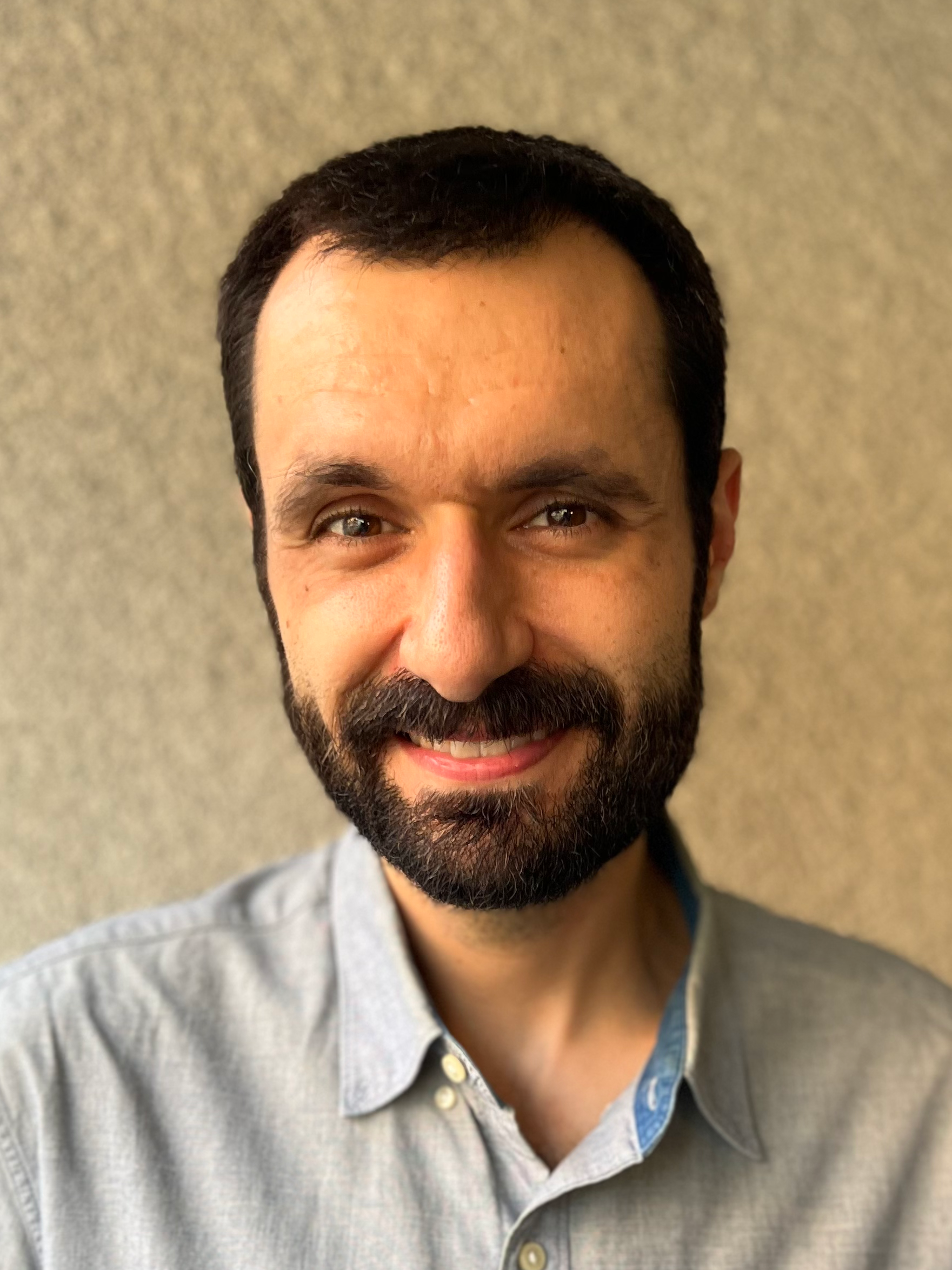
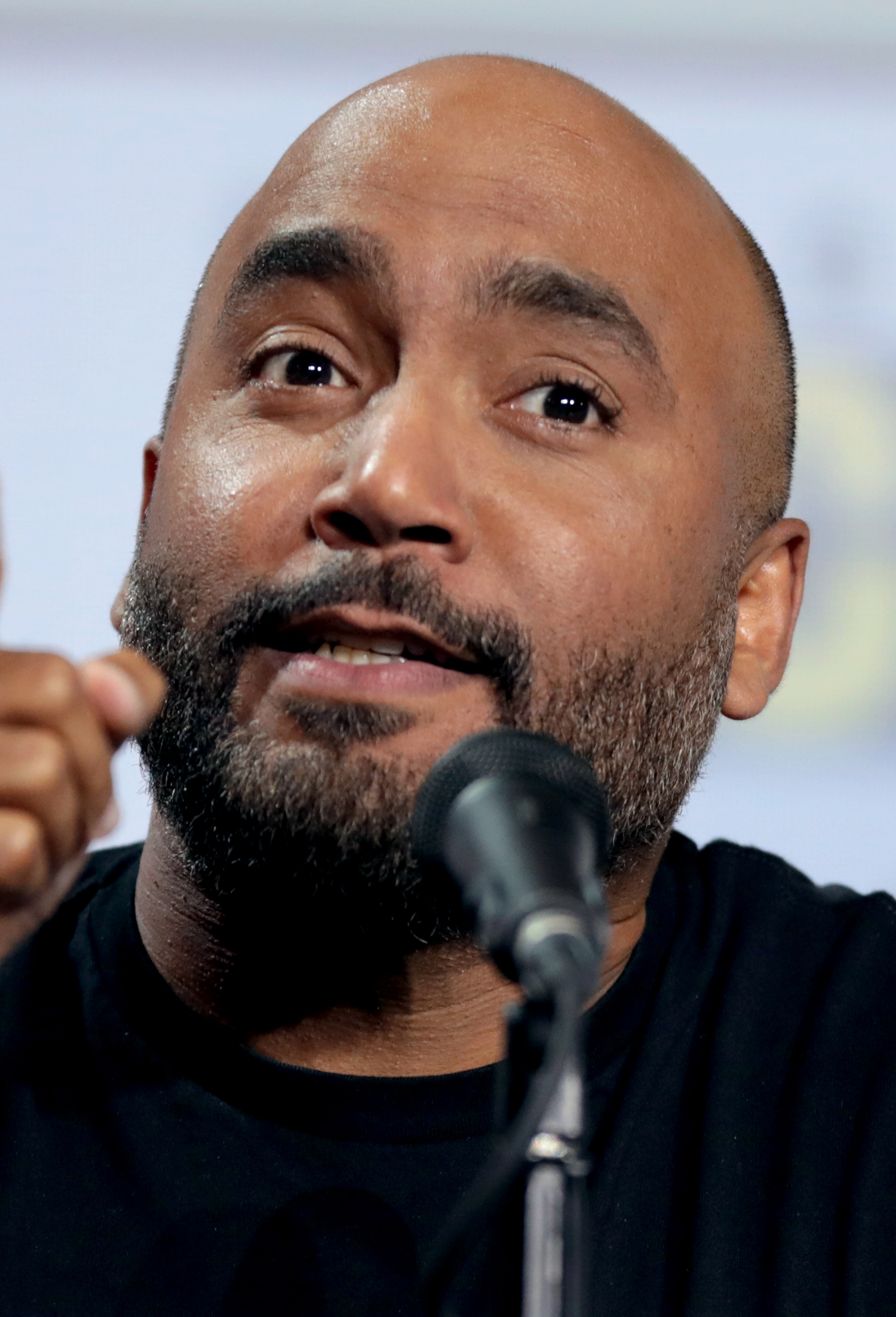
Matthew Gallant (left) and Shaun Escayg (right) led development of The Last of Us Part I as game director and creative director, respectively.

The existence of a remake of The Last of Us was first reported in April 2021 by Bloomberg News's Jason Schreier. The report claimed that the game, codenamed "T1X", was in development for PlayStation 5, having started at Sony's Visual Arts Support Group studio but eventually moving under Naughty Dog's budget after some staff joined the project in 2020. A PlayStation Store listing for the game, titled The Last of Us Part I, was prematurely released on June 9, 2022, including a trailer and information about the game. The game was officially announced later that day at Summer Game Fest. It was released for PlayStation 5 on September 2, 2022, and for Windows on March 28, 2023. Naughty Dog also announced special edition versions of the game, granting additional in-game upgrades and skills.

Development was led by game director Matthew Gallant and creative director Shaun Escayg, replacing Straley and Druckmann, respectively. Gallant had previously worked on the original game and Uncharted 4: A Thief's End (2016), and became lead systems designer on The Last of Us Part II (2020), co-leading the game's accessibility features. Escayg was lead cinematic animator on The Last of Us, and creative director on Uncharted: The Lost Legacy (2017), followed by his work as creative director and co-writer of Marvel's Avengers (2020) at Crystal Dynamics, before returning to Naughty Dog in April 2021. Development of the PlayStation 5 version ceased by July 11 as the game was submitted for manufacturing. According to principal environment artist Anthony Vaccaro, the development did not involve any crunch, unlike several of Naughty Dog's previous games. Iron Galaxy assisted with development of the Windows version.

== Release ==
In December 2011, prior to the announcement of the game, an Easter egg was found in Uncharted 3: Drake's Deception referencing the concept of The Last of Us on an in-game newspaper; Naughty Dog retroactively stated that the reference was supposed to be seen after the game's intended reveal at E3 in June 2011, but when the timing of the reveal itself was pushed to December, the team forgot to remove the reference. A few weeks before the game's announcement, a billboard in Times Square teased the game, naming it a "PlayStation 3 exclusive you won't believe". Sony officially unveiled the game on December 10, 2011, at the Spike Video Game Awards. Shortly after the unveiling, Naughty Dog co-president Evan Wells revealed details about the game:

The Last of Us is a genre-defining experience that blends survival and action elements to tell a character-driven tale about a modern plague decimating mankind. Nature encroaches upon civilization, forcing remaining survivors to kill for food, weapons and whatever they can find. Joel, a ruthless survivor, and Ellie, a brave young teenage girl who is wise beyond her years, must work together to survive their journey across what remains of the United States.

In February 2013, Naughty Dog announced that The Last of Us would miss its intended release date of May 7, 2013, delaying it until June 14, 2013 to allow for further polishing. "[I]nstead of cutting corners or compromising our vision, we came to the tough decision that the game deserved a few extra weeks to ensure every detail of The Last of Us was up to Naughty Dog's internal high standards", Naughty Dog stated in a press release.

== Promotion ==
Ellie's original design (left) was changed to make the character look like actress Ashley Johnson.

The game was extensively marketed through video trailers. The first trailer was released alongside the game's full announcement, showcasing the concept, characters, and setting. For this trailer, the team held extended discussions concerning features of the gameplay to include. They initially planned to omit the Infected from the first trailer, in order to sharpen the focus on the characters; they ultimately decided to include the Infected, as they felt that omitting them would arouse anticipation of their final reveal, trailing the focus away from the characters. For the final design of the trailer, the team attempted to incorporate as many gameplay features as possible, including human antagonism, melee implementation, stealth, and character relationships. The first game cinematic was released on May 15, 2012, depicting a scene in which Joel and Ellie are ambushed by hunters. This was followed by a second trailer titled "The Sky has Turned Grey", released on May 16. The trailer revealed a redesign of the character of Ellie; Druckmann revealed that this was to make her look more similar to actress Ashley Johnson.

A gameplay trailer was shown at E3 2012 on June 5. Straley and Druckmann appeared on Late Night with Jimmy Fallon on June 13 to discuss the game and showcase the trailer. A cinematic introducing Bill was shown during the game's San Diego Comic-Con panel on July 13. A third trailer was released during Gamescom on August 14, 2012, showcasing more of the game's environments and enemies. At the same event, a video was released, showcasing the process that cutscenes are developed, from the raw material to the final product. At PAX Prime 2012, Naughty Dog showcased a video demonstration of the game, displaying gameplay. A story trailer for the game was later shown during the 2012 Spike Video Game Awards, on December 7. A television trailer was broadcast following the third-season finale of AMC's The Walking Dead on March 31, 2013.

The game's cover art was unveiled on December 9, 2012, featuring Ellie and Joel; the team fought to feature Ellie on the front cover, despite attempts from external influences to move the image to the back. "I've been in discussions where we've been asked to push Ellie to the back and everyone at Naughty Dog just flat-out refused", said Druckmann. A demo for The Last of Us was included with all copies of God of War: Ascension, and was available from May 31, 2013 until the game's launch. A trailer for the online multiplayer mode was released on June 4, showcasing the factions elements to the mode. The final pre-launch trailer was released on June 11, during E3 2013.

A four-issue comic book miniseries, titled The Last of Us: American Dreams, was published by Dark Horse Comics from April to July 2013, written by Druckmann and illustrated by Faith Erin Hicks. To encourage pre-order sales, Naughty Dog collaborated with several retail outlets to provide special edition versions of the game. The "Post-Pandemic Edition" includes a unique case packaging, a statue of Joel and Ellie and unlock codes for additional content in the single-player and multiplayer modes. The "Joel Edition" and "Ellie Edition" include similar contents, but contain some features that are often differentiated by the characters.

Editions of The Last of Us
Features		Standard	Survival Edition	Joel Edition	Ellie Edition	Post-Pandemic Edition	Collector's Edition
Game Blu-ray disc		Yes	Yes	Yes	Yes	Yes	Yes
Naughty Dog sticker sheet		Yes	Yes	One sticker	One sticker	Yes	Yes
Additional content	Sights and Sounds	Pre-order only	Yes	Yes	Yes	Yes	Yes
Additional content	Survival	Pre-order only	Yes	Yes	Yes	Yes	Yes
Mini comic		No	Yes	Yes	Yes	Yes	No
Art book		No	Yes	No	No	No	Yes
Steelbook case		No	Yes	No	No	Yes	Yes
American Dreams cover variant		No	Yes	No	No	Yes	Yes
LittleBigPlanet Sackperson skin		No	No	Joel variant	Ellie variant	No	Yes
Controller skin		No	No	Joel variant	Ellie variant	No	Yes
Poster		No	No	Joel poster	Ellie poster	No	No
Canvas wrap case		No	No	Yes	Yes	No	No
Mini art book		No	No	Yes	Yes	No	No
Joel and Ellie Statue		No	No	No	No	Yes	Yes
Postcard set		No	No	No	No	No	Yes
T-shirt and umbrella		No	No	No	No	No	Yes

The game's script was published in a book by Dark Horse Books in December 2025.
