= Demonology (disambiguation) =

Demonology (/ˌdiː.mən.ˈɒl.ə.dʒi/, DEE-mən-ALL-ə-jee) is the systematic study of demons or beliefs about demons.

Demonology may also refer to:

- Demonology 101, a graphic novel
- An alternative spelling for Daemonologie, a dissertation on sorcery and demonology by King James

== See also ==
- Classification of demons
- Daemonolatreiae libri tres
