= The Last of Us: American Dreams =

Comic book series

- The original front cover of the first issue, with artwork by Julian Totino Tedesco. The covers were designed to bridge the realistic look of the game and the stylized look of the comic.

Publication information
- Publisher: Dark Horse Comics
- Format: Limited series
- Genre: Horror
- Publication date: April 3 – July 31, 2013
- No. of issues: 4
- Main character: Ellie

Creative team
- Written by: Neil Druckmann; Faith Erin Hicks
- Artist: Faith Erin Hicks
- Letterer: Clem Robins
- Colorist: Rachelle Rosenberg
- Editors: Jay Edidin; Brendan Wright

The Last of Us: American Dreams is a four-issue comic book limited series based on the video game The Last of Us. It was written by The Last of Us creative director Neil Druckmann and cartoonist Faith Erin Hicks, with illustrations by Hicks and coloring by Rachelle Rosenberg. The series was published by Dark Horse Comics between April and July 2013, and a collected edition was published in October 2013.

Like the game, the comic is set in a post-apocalyptic United States, overrun by zombie-like creatures infected by a mutated strain of the Cordyceps fungus. The comics serve as a prequel to the game, chronicling the journey of the young Ellie and her meeting with another young survivor, Riley Abel. Druckmann focused on Ellie due to the uniqueness of her birth and upbringing in the post-apocalyptic world. Hicks joined the project after discovering Ellie's role in the game, considering her an unusual character to include in a survival horror game. The comic's art style is different than the game art—a choice from Hicks to give the comic a unique feel and identity.

Critics praised Druckmann's writing and Hicks's illustrations. The series was a commercial success; the first issue was reprinted due to high demand.

== Publication history ==
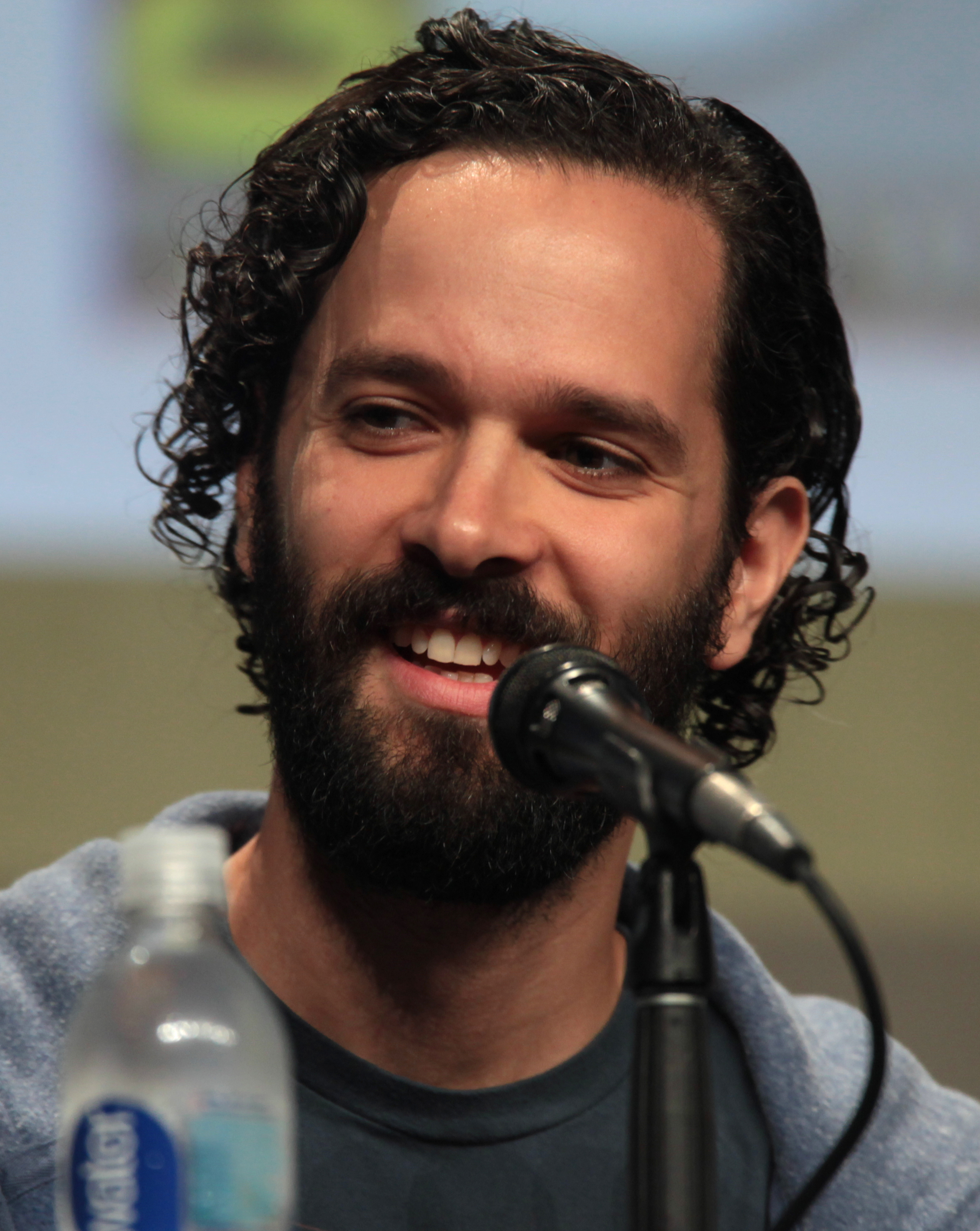
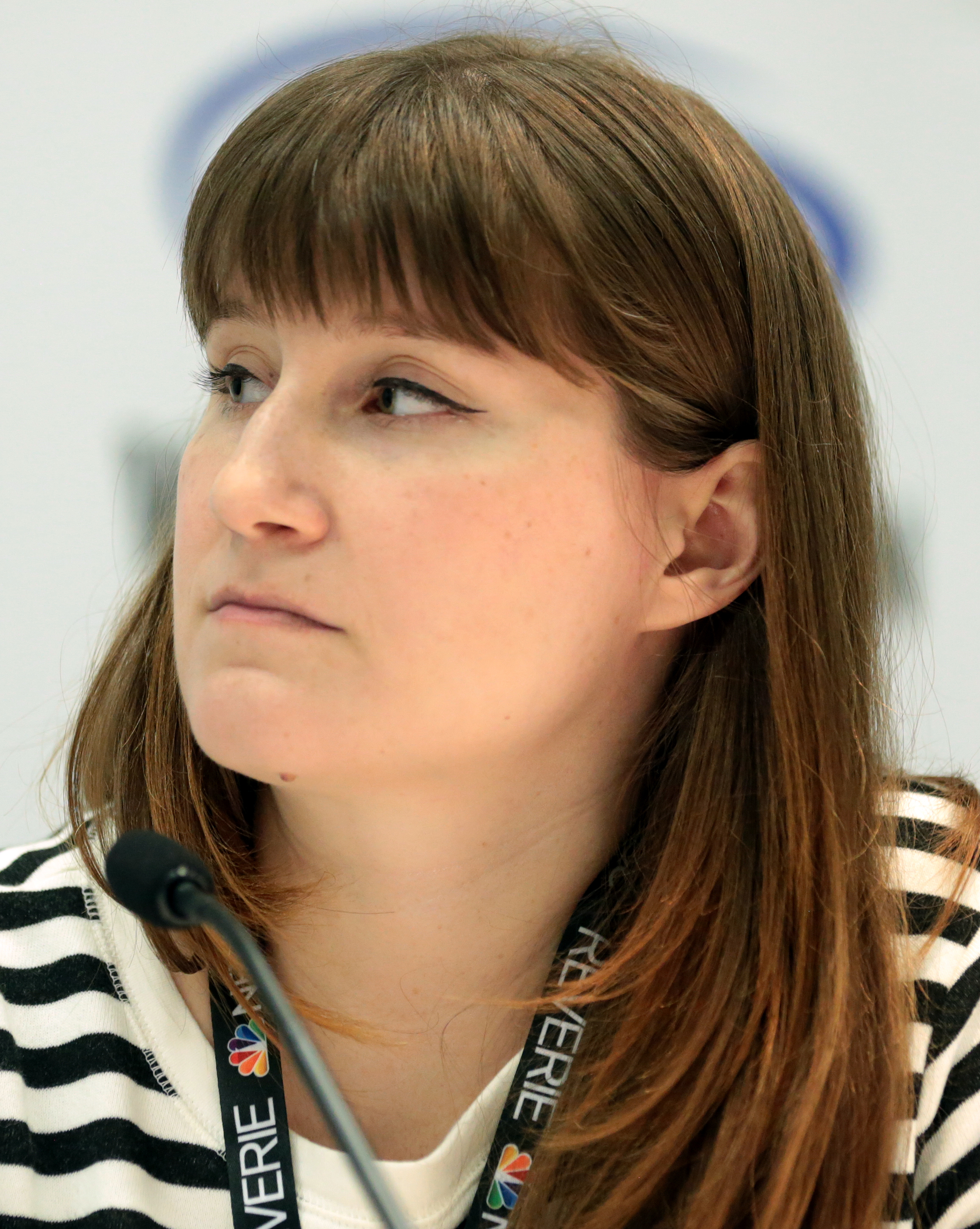
Neil Druckmann (left), creative director and writer of The Last of Us, wrote American Dreams with artist Faith Erin Hicks (right).

Dark Horse Comics approached creative director Neil Druckmann, who was working on The Last of Us, to produce a tie-in comic book series for the game. Druckmann was initially wary of the idea, but eventually agreed when he realized Dark Horse "didn't want to do something tangential" with the opportunity of expanding their characters and universe beyond the game. Work on the comic began during the game's development, which allowed the stories of the two projects to integrate, and influence each other. Druckmann requested webcomic artist Faith Erin Hicks as a collaborator on the project, after reading her comic Friends with Boys (2012) and appreciating "how personal it felt". He felt Hicks could capture the "gritty" feel of the game. Hicks then sent some concept art to Dark Horse as a pitch for the job; they accepted, and she became officially involved with the project. Hicks was drawn to the project after reading about the character of Ellie in the game's script; she considered Ellie an unusual character to include in a survival horror game, calling her a "tough teenage girl who wasn't sexualized, and who seemed very much the equal of her male counterpart". Hicks was given access to various gameplay sequences and the game's script during development, to allow her to better understand the story. She was also given videos of the actors performing on set, which was helpful when illustrating the characters. "I get a look at these characters and I see them interacting as human beings, not just as concept art," said Hicks.

Ellie's backstory was originally intended to fit as a gameplay sequence within The Last of Us, but this was ultimately scrapped. When Dark Horse approached Naughty Dog with the idea of a comic book, Druckmann had the opportunity to tell the story. Druckmann found Ellie was the ideal main character for the comic due to her birth and upbringing; while characters like Joel mostly lived in the world before the outbreak, Ellie is unaware of life prior to the outbreak. This created an interesting idea for Druckmann, who became intrigued with discovering the effects of everyday actions in a post-apocalyptic world. Hicks enjoyed writing American Dreams, particularly due to the humor featured in the comic. Druckmann allowed Hicks to design the character of Riley, including her physical appearance, characteristics, and most of her dialogue. "It felt like a good way to split it, where [Hicks] would own Riley and I would own Ellie," said Druckmann. When creating the comic's art style, Hicks avoided replicating the game art, instead opting to "draw it in [her] own style and to the best of [her] ability". She felt the art style is slightly "cartoony", which is partially due to Ellie's young age. "If [the comic] was hyper-realistic and super-rendered, I think it would undermine the story we're trying to tell", said Hicks. When designing the character Angel Knives for the comic's second issue, Hicks was inspired by the style of the characters from the Mortal Kombat series.

The first issue of the comic was published on April 3, 2013; it sold out, and high demand prompted Dark Horse to issue a reprint on May 29 alongside the second issue. The third issue was published on June 26, and the fourth on July 31. All four were republished in a collected edition as a single package on October 30, 2013. The comics were republished with new cover art by David Blatt in the Firefly Edition of The Last of Us Part I on September 2, 2022, and a version with different cover art is set to be published in the collector's edition of The Last of Us Complete—a bundle of Part I and Part II Remastered—on July 10, 2025.

== Plot ==
At the Boston quarantine zone, Ellie becomes caught in a fight with a group of boys who attempt to steal her belongings. Riley Abel steps in to break up the fight, beating one of the boys and making the others flee. Ellie becomes angered by this, claiming she can take care of herself. Riley then advises Ellie to flee, but the latter is caught and assigned to cleaning duty. While she is completing the chore, she realizes Riley stole her Walkman, and later demands she return it, which Riley reluctantly does.

At night, Ellie catches Riley attempting to sneak out of the school, and demands to accompany her. Riley reluctantly agrees, and the two make their way to the mall, where they meet Riley's friend Winston. As Winston teaches Ellie how to ride a horse, Riley steals his radio, and discovers that an attack by the Fireflies—a rebel group opposing the quarantine zone authorities—has occurred nearby. Ellie and Riley make their way to the attack, and find the Fireflies are wounded and outnumbered. To help, Ellie and Riley throw smoke grenades at the military, allowing the Fireflies to retreat safely. They are spotted by the military, and escape into a nearby alley, where they narrowly avoid being bitten by an Infected—zombie-like creatures infected by a mutated strain of the Cordyceps fungus.

The girls are soon captured by Fireflies, who restrain them; Marlene, the leader of the Fireflies, recognizes Ellie, and demands she remain safe. When Riley claims she would like to join their group, Marlene refuses, and the two argue, resulting in Marlene threatening to shoot Riley. Ellie intervenes, demanding at gunpoint that Marlene explain how she knows information about Ellie. When Ellie finally lowers the gun, Marlene informs her she knew Ellie's mother, and had promised her she would take care of Ellie. Ellie hands the gun to Marlene, who says she would tell her more about her mother in the future, before telling the girls to leave. When Ellie and Riley reenter the quarantine zone, Riley says there is no escape. Ellie suggests running away, but Riley informs her this will just result in death. The two then walk back into the school.

== Reception ==
The comic's artwork, with illustrations by Faith Erin Hicks, was praised for its simplicity.

Bloody Disgusting's Lonnie Nadler felt unsure about the comic's story in the first two issues due to their dedication to character development, but praised the final issue for delivering "authentic drama and raw intensity" which was missing from previous issues. IGN's Jesse Schedeen felt the story served to enhance the world and characters, and later praised the comic's availability to readers who had not played the game. Conversely, Invisible Gamer's Nathan Butler felt the introduction and development of the first two issues could have been shortened and the final issue attempted to include too much content, ultimately calling the comic a "sub-par attempt at a video game tie-in series".

SciFiNow's Alasdair Stuart called the art style was "so expressive and relaxed", naming Hicks "one of the best artists of her generation". Forbes's Jen Bosier felt the art worked well within the context of the story, and IGN's Schedeen felt the comic's reliance on the artwork gave it a unique "style and identity". Bloody Disgusting's Nadler called it "quite simplistic, but very clean", and "visually expressive when it matters", comparing it to Scott Pilgrim. Nadler also praised the color choices for containing "the right palette of dark and murkey hues" and the cover artwork for being "consistently stunning". Comic Book Resources's Jennifer Cheng similarly felt the colors fit with the setting of the comic. Geeks of Doom's Peter Jubinsky found Hicks's depiction of the Infected as "in pain and desperate" to be "especially harrowing".
