= 2011 Governor General's Awards =

Canadian literary award

The shortlisted nominees for the 2011 Governor General's Awards for Literary Merit were announced on October 11, and the winners were announced on November 15.

== English ==
Category	Winner	Nominated
Fiction	Patrick deWitt, The Sisters Brothers	David Bezmozgis, The Free World; Esi Edugyan, Half-Blood Blues; Marina Endicott, The Little Shadows; Alexi Zentner, Touch
Non-fiction	Charles Foran, Mordecai: The Life & Times	Nathan M. Greenfield, The Damned: The Canadians at the Battle of Hong Kong and the POW Experience, 1941-45; Richard Gwyn, Nation Maker: Sir John A. Macdonald: His Life, Our Times, Volume Two: 1867-1891; JJ Lee, The Measure of a Man: The Story of a Father, a Son, and a Suit; Andrew Nikiforuk, Empire of the Beetle: How Human Folly and a Tiny Bug Are Killing North America's Great Forests
Poetry	Phil Hall, Killdeer	Michael Boughn, Cosmographia: A Post-Lucretian Faux Micro-Epic; Kate Eichhorn, Fieldnotes, A Forensic; Garry Thomas Morse, Discovery Passages; Susan Musgrave, Origami Dove
Drama	Erin Shields, If We Were Birds	Brendan Gall, Minor Complications: Two Plays; Jonathan Garfinkel, House of Many Tongues; Donna-Michelle St. Bernard, Gas Girls; Vern Thiessen, Lenin's Embalmers
Children's literature	Christopher Moore, From Then to Now: A Short History of the World	Jan L. Coates, A Hare in the Elephant's Trunk; Deborah Ellis, No Ordinary Day; Kenneth Oppel, This Dark Endeavour; Tim Wynne-Jones, Blink & Caution
Children's illustration	Cybèle Young, Ten Birds	Isabelle Arsenault, Migrant; Kim LaFave, Fishing with Gubby; Renata Liwska, Red Wagon; Frank Viva, Along a Long Road
French to English translation	Donald Winkler, Partita for Glenn Gould (Partita pour Glenn Gould, Georges Leroux)	Judith Cowan, Meridian Line (Origine des méridiens, Paul Bélanger); David Scott Hamilton, Exit (Paradis, clef en main, Nelly Arcan); Lazer Lederhendler, Apocalypse for Beginners (Tarmac, Nicolas Dickner); Lazer Lederhendler, Dirty Feet (Les pieds sales, Edem Awumey)

== French ==
Category	Winner	Nominated
Fiction	Perrine Leblanc, L'homme blanc	Alain Beaulieu, Le postier Passila; Jean-Simon Desrochers, Les sabliers de solitude; Tassia Trifiatis, Mère-grand; Mélanie Vincelette, Polynie
Non-fiction	Georges Leroux, Wanderer : essai sur le Voyage d'hiver de Franz Schubert	Karine Cellard, Leçons de littérature : un siècle de manuels scolaires au Québec; Henri Dorion and Jean-Paul Lacasse, Le Québec : territoire incertain; Catherine Leclerc, Des langues en partage? Cohabitation du français et de l'anglais en littérature contemporaine; Patrick Tillard, De Bartleby aux écrivains négatifs : une approche de la négation
Poetry	Louise Dupré, Plus haut que les flammes	Martine Audet, Je demande pardon à l'espèce qui brille (Les Grands cimetières II); Roger Des Roches, Le nouveau temps du verbe être; Patrick Lafontaine, Grève du zèle; Jean-François Poupart, L'Or de Klimt
Drama	Normand Chaurette, Ce qui meurt en dernier	Steve Gagnon, La montagne rouge (SANG); Pierre-Luc Lasalle, Judith aussi; Étienne Lepage, L'enclos de l'éléphant; Wajdi Mouawad, Journée de noces chez les Cromagnons
Children's literature	Martin Fournier, Les aventures de Radisson - 1. L'enfer ne brûle pas	Anne Bernard-Lenoir, Enigmae.com - 3. L'orteil de Paros; Camille Bouchard, Un massacre magnifique; Mario Brassard, La saison des pluies; Pierre Marmiesse, Sous le signe d'Exu - 1. Initiation
Children's illustration	Caroline Merola, Lili et les poilus	Sophie Casson, Quelle pagaille!; Shea Chang, Tarentelle; Élisabeth Eudes-Pascal, Bill Chocottes, le héros qui avait peur; Rogé, Haïti, mon pays
English to French translation	Maryse Warda, Toxique ou l'incident dans l'autobus (The Toxic Bus Incident, Greg MacArthur)	Geneviève Letarte, Le week-end en Bourgogne (Mavis Gallant, Going Ashore); Sophie Voillot, Le droit chemin (David Homel, Mid Way)
