= Ten Birds =

2011 picture book by Cybèle Young

- Ten Birds Front Cover. Illustrated by Cybèle Young
- Editor: Tara Walker
- Author: Cybèle Young
- Illustrator: Cybèle Young
- Language: English
- Genre: Children's picture book
- Publisher: Kids Can Press Ltd.
- Publication date: 2011
- Publication place: Canada
- Media type: Print (Hardcover)
- Pages: 30
- ISBN: 978-1-55453-568-2

Ten Birds is a picture book written and illustrated by Cybèle Young and published in 2011. The children's fable is about ten birds trying to find a way to cross the river. Using numbers and clever ways of thinking, the birds cross the river one at a time. The story is aimed towards children in grades 1–3 to teach them valuable skills, from counting to the importance of critical thinking.Cybèle's book received the 2011 Governor General's Awards. Illustrations in the book were drawn with pen and ink, making the pictures very intricate as well as black and white.

== Plot summary ==
At the beginning of the story, ten birds are on a riverbank trying to figure out a way to cross to the other side. One by one the birds find a way to cross the river using different building materials. The first bird, the one they call "Brilliant", builds some slits and crosses the river. The next bird, the one they call "Quite Advanced", engineers an underwater paddle to get to the other side. As the book goes on one by one they cross the river, each with different names. The last bird to cross the river is the one they call "Needs Improvement." This bird devises a simple plan, to just walk across the bridge to the other side of the river, leaving all the birds astounded.

=== Birds Names: The one they call... ===
- Brilliant
- Quite Advanced
- Magnificent
- Shows Great Promise
- Extraordinary
- Outstanding
- Highly Satisfactory
- Exceptional
- Remarkable
- Needs Improvement

== Educational influence ==
This book is able to teach children about counting from 0-10 as the birds cross the river. It also teaches children to think critically and use common sense. Another lesson the books teaches is that labels can be wrong, and it shows that "the best solution to a problem is often the simplest one." It is also seen that "The form of the fable invites the reader to build a set of expectations: to laugh, to discover, and to be surprised. Young strikes a fine balance between the known and unknown."

== Translations ==
The Children's book Ten Birds is also available in French. Translated the book is called Dix oiseaux

== Illustrations ==
"The illustrations consist of black fine-lined, monochromatic pen and ink drawings on an ivory background. Because of the lack of colour, it is the intricacies of the lines that communicate emotion and narrative - quite a feat. The fable is seemingly set on the edge of the world; the curve of the stark landscape and the stars reflecting off the water lend both an otherworldly, yet familiar tone."

== Author ==
Cybèle Young is an artist known around the world, having her work features in galleries in New York City, London, Vancouver and Calgary. She attended the Ontario College of Art and Design and studied sculpture and printmaking. Since graduating from post secondary she has been awarded over twenty arts grants and awards. Young has been seen in many publications around the world such as, Art in America, Canadian Art magazine, Fibre Arts, Maclean's, Elle, and Toronto Life. "Her art practice and family life have inspired the creation of several children's books." "Cybèle lives with her husband and two children in Toronto, Ontario".

== Reception and awards ==
Cybèle Young was nominated for a Governor General's Award for illustration in 2000. She then won in 2011 for the bookTen Birds. Canada Council artist's residency grant was given to Cybele to live in Paris for four months in summer 2012 so she could create new work.

=== Sequel ===
The book Ten Birds was also made into a sequel called Ten Birds Meet a Monster. This book is similar to the first book, highlighting counting. The Ten birds are scared by a monster and one by one they come up with plans and inventions to scare the monster away. This books illustrations are also drawn with ink and pen.

== Publisher ==
Kids Can Press published this Children's Book in 2011.

Founded in 1973 and Headquarters located in Toronto, Ontario.

"Kids Can Press acknowledges the financial support of the Government of Ontario, through the Ontario Media Development Corporation's Ontario Book Initiative; the Ontario Arts Council; the Canada Council for the Arts; and the Government of Canada, through the BPIDP, for our publishing activity."

== Other publications ==
Books
Book	Author(s)	Year
Daughter of the Great Zandini	Cary Fagan and Cybèle Young	2001
Jack Pine	Christopher Patton and Cybèle Young	2007
Ten Birds	Cybèle Young	2011
A Few Blocks	Cybèle Young	2011
A Few Bites	Cybèle Young	2012
Ten Birds Meet a Monster	Cybèle Young	2013
Out The Window	Cybèle Young	2013
