= Greg Kearney =

Canadian writer

- Born: Kenora, Ontario, Canada
- Occupations: Novelist; short story writer; playwright
- Writing career
- Period: 2000s-present
- Notable works: Pretty; The Desperates

Greg Kearney is a Canadian writer. He was a humour columnist for Xtra! from 1999 to 2005, and published his debut short story collection Mommy Daddy Baby in 2004.

Born in Kenora, Ontario, he is based in Toronto, where he studied theatre at York University.

He was awarded an Honour of Distinction from the Dayne Ogilvie Prize in 2009, and his second short story collection Pretty, published in 2011, won a ReLit Award in the short fiction category in 2012.

His first novel, The Desperates, was published by Cormorant Books in 2013.

He has also written several short plays for Buddies in Bad Times' annual Rhubarb Festival and Theatre Passe Muraille, including The Fruits and Crosses, Margot and the Great Big Plate, The Cry Sisters, The Betty Dean Fanzine, (555) 555 5555 and Cancun. Cancun appears in the Sky Gilbert-edited anthology Perfectly Abnormal: Seven Gay Plays, published by Playwrights Canada Press in 2006, alongside plays by Harry Rintoul, Shawn Postoff, Christian Lloyd, Greg MacArthur, Ken Brand and Michael Achtman.

His 2024 novel An Evening with Birdy O'Day was a finalist for the 2025 Stephen Leacock Memorial Medal for Humour.

== Works ==
- Mommy Daddy Baby (2004, ISBN 978-1894692090)
- Pretty (2011, ISBN 978-1550962208)
- The Desperate (2013, ISBN 978-1770863026)
- An Evening with Birdy O'Day (2024, ISBN 978-1551529417)
