= Faith Erin Hicks =

Canadian cartoonist

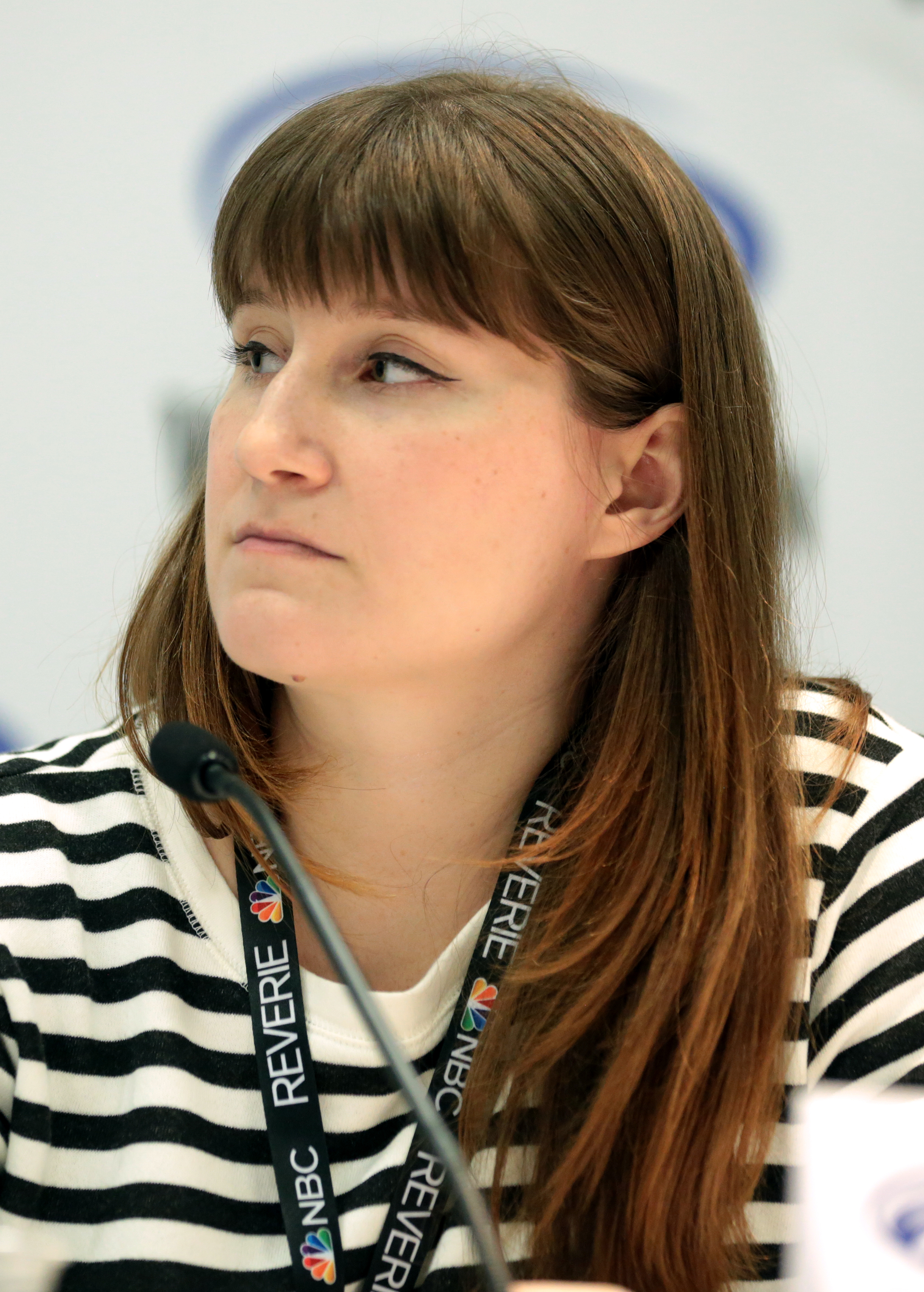
- Hicks in March 2018
- Born: British Columbia
- Areas: Writer, artist
- Notable works: Demonology 101; Zombies Calling; The Nameless City trilogy
- Awards: Two Eisner Awards 2003 Web Cartoonists' Choice Awards; 2004 Web Cartoonists' Choice Awards

Faith Erin Hicks is a Canadian cartoonist and animator living in Vancouver, British Columbia.

She has created a number of graphic novels, both as sole creator (such as Zombies Calling! and Friends with Boys) and as a collaborator (Nothing Could Possibly Go Wrong and Buffy: The High School Years), as well as serialized works like Demonology 101 and The Adventures of Superhero Girl.

== Biography ==
After studying animation at Sheridan College, Faith Erin Hicks came to prominence with her long-running webcomic Demonology 101 (D101).

Since the beginning of Demonology 101, Hicks has completed a spinoff of the D101 character Sachs entitled A Distant Faith. She also created a zombie-movie inspired comic called Zombies Calling, as well as the dystopian comic Ice (originally published on Modern Tales).

She drew backgrounds for the George of the Jungle animated series and created Jenny’s Brothers, a comic strip to the Halifax Chronicle-Herald. Her original comic series The Adventures of Superhero Girl ran weekly in Halifax's local free paper, The Coast, as well as on her own website. and was collected into a book by Dark Horse Comics.

Her graphic novel Friends with Boys was published in February 2012 from First Second. She was also the illustrator and co-writer for the graphic novel The Last of Us: American Dreams, along with Neil Druckmann.

On January 30, 2014, it was announced that Hicks would illustrate the first of two graphic novels written by young adult author Rainbow Rowell. This book would be published as Pumpkinheads on August 27, 2019.

On October 26, 2020, Hicks announced she was working on Ride On, her upcoming graphic novel, to be published by First Second.

Hicks has won two Eisner Awards. In 2014, she won for Best Publication for Kids for The Adventures of Superhero Girl. Then in 2019 Eisner Award for Best Publication for Kids (ages 9–12) for The Nameless City: The Divided Earth.

In 2026 she won the Harvey Award for Best Children's Book for Inbetweens, published by First Second.

== Bibliography ==
- Demonology 101 (webcomic, August 1999 – June 2004)
- Ice (webcomic, Modern Tales 2003 - February 14, 2010)
- Zombies Calling (graphic novel, Slave Labor Graphics, November 2007, ISBN 9781593620790)
- The War at Ellsmere (graphic novel, Slave Labor Graphics, December 2008, ISBN 9781442022560)
  - One Year at Ellsmere (graphic novel reissue in full color with new lineart, First Second, July 7, 2020, ISBN 9781250219107)
- Brain Camp, written by Susan Kim and Laurence Klavan (graphic novel, First Second, August 3, 2010, ISBN 9781596433663)
- Friends with Boys (graphic novel, First Second Books, February 2012, ISBN 9781250068163)
- Bigfoot Boy, written by J. Torres
  - Into the Woods (graphic novel, Kids Can Press, September 1, 2012, ISBN 9781554537112)
  - The Unkindness of Ravens (graphic novel, Kids Can Press, September 1, 2013, ISBN 9781554537136)
  - The Sound of Thunder (graphic novel, Kids Can Press, September 1, 2014, ISBN 9781894786584)
- The Adventures of Superhero Girl (graphic novel, Dark Horse, February 2013, ISBN 9781616550844)
- Nothing Can Possibly Go Wrong, written by Prudence Shen (graphic novel, First Second, May 2013, ISBN 9781596436596)
- The Last of Us: American Dreams, written by Neil Druckmann (graphic novel, Dark Horse, November 2013, ISBN 9781616552121)
- The Nameless City Trilogy
  - The Nameless City, colors by Jordie Bellaire (graphic novel, First Second, April 2016, ISBN 9781626721579)
  - The Stone Heart, colors by Jordie Bellaire (graphic novel, First Second, April 2017, ISBN 9781626721593)
  - The Divided Earth, colors by Jordie Bellaire (graphic novel, First Second, September 2018, ISBN 9781626721609)
- Comics Will Break Your Heart (novel, Roaring Brook Press, February 2019, ISBN 9781626723641)
- Pumpkinheads, written by Rainbow Rowell (graphic novel, First Second, August 2019, ISBN 9781250312853)
- Avatar: The Last Airbender: Imbalance trilogy, art by Peter Wartman
  - Part One, colors by Ryan Hill (graphic novel, Dark Horse, December 2018 ISBN 9781506704890)
  - Part Two, colors by Adele Matera (graphic novel, Dark Horse, May 2019 ISBN 9781506706528)
  - Part Three, colors by Adele Matera (graphic novel, Dark Horse, October 2019 ISBN 9781506708133)
- Avatar: The Last Airbender: Katara and the Pirate's Silver, art by Peter Wartman, colors by Adele Matera (graphic novel, Dark Horse, October 2020 ISBN 9781506717111)
- Avatar: The Last Airbender: Toph Beifong's Metalbending Academy, art by Peter Wartman, colors by Adele Matera (graphic novel, Dark Horse, February 2021 ISBN 9781506717128)
- Ride On (graphic novel, First Second, August 2022 ISBN 9781250772824)
- Hockey Girl Loves Drama Boy (graphic novel, First Second, October 2023 ISBN 9781250838728)
- Inbetweens (graphic novel, First Second, March 2025, ISBN 9781250838742

== Awards ==
- 2003: Web Cartoonists' Choice Awards, for Demonology 101:
  - Won "Outstanding Writing" Award
  - Won "Outstanding Black and White Art" Award
  - Nominated for "Outstanding Art" Award
  - Nominated for "Outstanding Character Development" Award
  - Nominated for "Outstanding Long Form Comic" Award
  - Nominated for "Outstanding Dramatic Comic" Award
- 2004: Web Cartoonists' Choice Awards, for Demonology 101:
  - Won "Outstanding Dramatic Comic" Award
  - Won "Outstanding Long Form Comic" Award
- 2008, for Zombies Calling:
  - Won the "Favourite Canadian Comic Book Creator - English-Language Publications" Joe Shuster Award
  - Nominated for the "Outstanding Canadian Comic Book Cartoonist (Writer/Artist)" Joe Shuster Award
- 2014:
  - Won the "2014 Will Eisner Comic Industry Award - Best Publication for Kids" for The Adventures of Superhero Girl
  - Nominated twice the 2013 Shuster Awards both in the category The Dragon Award (Comics for Kids). One nomination was for her solo effort The Adventures of Superhero Girl, and the other was for her collaboration with J. Bone, Bigfoot Boy volume 2.
- 2019, for The Nameless City: The Divided Earth:
  - Won the "2019 Will Eisner Comic Industry Award - Best Publication for Kids"
- 2026
  - Won the Harvey Award for Best Children's Book for Inbetweens.
