= Ken Brand =

Canadian playwright

Ken Brand is a Canadian playwright from Winnipeg, Manitoba. One of the significant figures in the emergence of LGBTQ theatre in Canada in the 1990s, he is most noted for his play The Bathhouse Suite, which appears in the Sky Gilbert-edited anthology Perfectly Abnormal: Seven Gay Plays alongside plays by Harry Rintoul, Shawn Postoff, Christian Lloyd, Greg MacArthur, Greg Kearney and Michael Achtman.

His other plays include Benchmarks and Burying Michael.
