= Zombies Calling =

Book by Faith Erin Hicks

- The cover of Zombies Calling.
- Date: November 7, 2007
- Publisher: Slave Labor Graphics

Creative team
- Writers: Faith Erin Hicks
- Artists: Faith Erin Hicks
- ISBN: 1593620799

Zombies Calling is a 2007 graphic novel written and illustrated by Faith Erin Hicks and published by Slave Labor Graphics.

It concerns the adventures of a young college girl named Joss, who has an obsession with England and zombie movies. She and her two dorm-mates are the only three survivors of a campus-wide zombie plague, but Joss has a strong understanding of the "Rules" of zombie movies. Using the rules, they will survive. Zombies Calling is a more humorous take on zombie stories, similar to the zombie film Shaun of the Dead.

== Plot ==
Joss, Sonnet and Robyn are all dorm-mates at London University, a university in southern Ontario. Joss is studying for exams, but while on a snack run, she's nearly overrun by zombies. Initially afraid, the "First Rule of Zombie Movies" kicks in for Joss: confronted with zombies, ordinary people will transform into tough, adept and ruthless fighters. Joss survives the attack and runs back to her dorm in a panic, but Sonnet and Robyn don't believe her. The zombies have since dispersed, and are nowhere to be seen.

Later, during the exam, the zombies return. Joss gets Sonnet and Robyn, and they barricade themselves in their dorm, since the nearest mall is too far away (another Zombie Rule: "Never leave the mall"). The phones are out, according to another Rule, so they remain in the dorm room. Meanwhile, the Canadian Army are figuring out what to do about the zombies. A high-ranking officer mentions that his son, Robyn, can "turn the tide of a Zombie invasion".

The next morning, the zombie epidemic is just as bad. Joss wants to stay in the dorm and await rescue, but Sonnet and Robyn know another Rule: no one ever rescues the survivors. They make a break for it, armed only with a spork. Soon, however, they're surrounded. As the Zombies close in, Joss' English professor emerges, and explains that he created the zombie epidemic by poisoning the coffee at the campus coffeehouse as a statement about the cheapening of higher education: few university students care any more about education, and would rather just pay for a degree. They are figurative zombies, so the professor has turned them into literal zombies.

Just then, the Army launches air strikes to purge the zombies. Joss, Sonnet and Robyn still need to get away, however, so Joss follows another Zombie Rule: sacrifice yourself to lead the zombies away. The zombies corner her in the university library, which is then bombed.

Joss survives the collapse, and wakes up a few weeks later in the hospital. The university is in ruins after a large portion of its student and faculty population became zombies and were purged. Mortified to hear this, Joss decides to vacation in England.

The Canadian government has paid for Joss' trip to England. There she meets a boy wearing a Canada T-shirt, and they go walking along the Thames together.

== Characters ==
Joss - Short for Jocelyn, she is the story's protagonist. She's energetic and bizarre, and also courageous and quick-witted. She's constantly worried about her student loan and has a perpetual obsession with England, always wearing a Union Jack tank top, and peppering her vocabulary with British slang. She has strong knowledge about zombie movies, which proves invaluable to their survival. She also has a strong emotional side later in the story.

Sonnet - Joss' friend. She's mildly Goth, having black-dyed hair and an interest in writing macabre poetry, but is very sly and chipper. She's the most confused and horrified by the zombie plague.

Robyn - Joss' roommate. He's a slacker, overly excitable, and is blissfully unaware of the danger around him. He's also somewhat of a pervert; Joss suspects that Robyn likes to root through her underwear drawer, and he has a dream of making love to Belinda Stronach. His parents have a mysterious position of authority in the Canadian Army, and they organize an offensive against the zombies.

The Professor - Although never named, the Professor is Joss' teacher, and he's the one that has created the zombie plague. He is also able to control the zombies, since they view him as their leader. He's very smarmy, and usually refers to his students as "children". The other characters think he's completely insane for having created a zombie infestation to "make a point".

== The Rules ==
"The Rules" are a list of zombie movie clichés that play an important role in Zombies Calling. These are the ones mentioned in the story:

- Rule One - When confronted with zombies, an ordinary person will transform into a strong and wild fighter, regardless of occupation, personality, or athletic ability.
- Rule Two - One of the survivors will sacrifice him or herself to distract the zombies, so that the other survivors can escape. Usually, it's the story's protagonist.

The remaining Rules are not numbered:

- The best way to wait out a zombie plague is to barricade yourself inside a mall (however, in this story it's a college dormitory), and you should never leave.
- The survivors always fight the zombies.
- Guns will suddenly become readily available (however, they never do in this story).
- No one ever refers to the zombies as "zombies". The main characters, however, do it frequently, since they're aware of the Rules.
- The phone lines will always be dead.
- No one ever rescues the survivors.

== Background references ==
A number of background items reference real-life films and other things. They include:

- A poster for the 2002 zombie film 28 Days Later. For some reason, it's in German.
- A poster for the 2006 film Children of Men.
- A poster for the 2007 action film Hot Fuzz. An earlier film by the makers of Hot Fuzz was the popular zombie comedy Shaun of the Dead.
- A poster of the famous "thumbs-up" logo from The Hitchhiker's Guide to the Galaxy.
- A poster with the Copernicus Studios logo on it. Copernicus is a Halifax-based animation studio, where the author worked as an animator while making Zombies Calling.
- The title of the comic is a reference to London Calling, an album and song by the British punk rock band The Clash.

Much of the referenced material originates from England, probably reflecting Joss' (and the author's) obsession with England.

== Critical reception ==
Zombies Calling was well received by critics. Faith Erin Hicks was nominated for the 2008 Joe Shuster Award for "Best Cartoonist (Writer/Artist)" and won the award for "Favourite Creator: English Language Publication".
