= Ken Garnhum =

Canadian playwright, performance artist and theatrical designer

Ken Garnhum is a Canadian playwright, performance artist and theatrical designer. He is most noted for his performance piece Beuys, Buoys, Boys, which was a finalist for the Dora Mavor Moore Award for Outstanding New Play in 1989, and his play Pants on Fire, which won the Floyd S. Chalmers Canadian Play Award in 1995.

== Career ==
Originally from Charlottetown, Prince Edward Island, Garnhum worked in art and theatre in Charlottetown before moving to Toronto in 1981. His other plays and performance pieces include Building a Post-Mortem Birdhouse (1986), How Many Saints Can Sit Around? (1987), Twenty Minute History of Art (1987), Surrounded by Water (1991), The Incredible Red Vase (1991), one word (1997) and The Hermits (1998).

In 1992, Beuys, Buoys, Boys was included in Making Out, the first anthology of Canadian plays by gay writers, alongside works by David Demchuk, Sky Gilbert, Daniel MacIvor, Harry Rintoul and Colin Thomas. Pants on Fire, one of the early AIDS-themed plays in Canadian literature, was the first play Garnhum wrote after himself being diagnosed HIV-positive in 1993. In 1994, his Surrounded by Water was included in Solo, an anthology of monodrama edited by Jason Sherman.

He has also regularly worked as a set and costume designer, both on his own shows and for other playwrights; he garnered Dora Mavor Moore Award nominations for set design in 1994 for a production of The House of Martin Guerre, and for both costume and set design in 1996 for Gloria Montero's Frida K.
