= Greg MacArthur =

Canadian playwright (born 1970)

- Born: 1970 (age 55–56); Lindsay, Ontario, Canada
- Occupation: Playwright
- Writing career
- Period: 2000s–present
- Notable works: The Toxic Bus Incident; Snowman

Greg MacArthur (born 1970) is a Canadian playwright. A graduate of Ryerson University's theatre school, he is known for plays including Girls! Girls! Girls!, Snowman, Get Away, Recovery, Tyland, The Toxic Bus Incident and The Missionary Position.

His play The Rise and Fall of Peter Gaveston appears in the Sky Gilbert-edited anthology Perfectly Abnormal: Seven Gay Plays, published by Playwrights Canada Press in 2006, alongside plays by Harry Rintoul, Shawn Postoff, Christian Lloyd, Greg Kearney, Ken Brand, and Michael Achtman.

MacArthur was a nominee for the Siminovitch Prize in Theatre in 2011. At the 2011 Governor General's Awards, Maryse Warda won the Governor General's Award for English to French translation for her translation of The Toxic Bus Incident.
