= Colin Thomas =

Canadian writer

Colin Thomas is a Canadian writer from Vancouver, British Columbia. He is known as a longtime theatre critic for The Georgia Straight, an alt-weekly, serving 30 years until 2016.

In addition, Thomas has written original plays for young audiences that explore contemporary issues. He has won three Floyd S. Chalmers Canadian Play Awards in the youth theatre division: for One Thousand Cranes in 1985, Two Weeks Twice a Year in 1991, and Flesh and Blood in 1992.

In 1992, Flesh and Blood was included in Making Out, the first anthology of Canadian plays by gay writers. Also in the collection were works by David Demchuk, Sky Gilbert, Daniel MacIvor, Harry Rintoul, and Ken Garnhum.
