= Kids Can Press =

Canadian children's book publisher

Kids Can Press Limited
- Logo used since 2021
- Type: Subsidiary
- Industry: Publishing
- Founded: 1973; 53 years ago
- Founder: Frieda Forman
- Headquarters: Corus Quay, Toronto, Ontario, Canada
- Products: Books
- Parent: Nelvana (1998-2000); Corus Entertainment (2000-present)
- Website: www.kidscanpress.com

Kids Can Press is a Canadian-owned publisher of children's books, with a catalogue of nearly 1,000 picture books and 500 e-books, nonfiction, and fiction titles for toddlers to young adults. The Kids Can Press list includes well-known characters such as Franklin the Turtle.

The press was chosen as the principal distributor of the Indigenous Peoples Atlas of Canada.

Kids Can Press' books are currently distributed by Hachette Client Services.

== Description ==
Kids Can Press started in 1973 as an initiative from the Ontario College of Art to take advantage of growing nationalism within Canada during the 1970s to provide locally relevant children's material. In 1986, the publisher became a privately owned business ran by Valerie Hussey and Ricky Englander. In 1998, the company was purchased by Canadian animation firm Nelvana for $6.1 million. Englander left that same year. In 2000, Corus Entertainment acquired Nelvana, the parent company of Kids Can Press, and they have operated the two aforementioned companies ever since. Hussey remained at the company until 2006, when she stepped down and Lisa Lyons assumed leadership.

Kids Can Press has published in partnership with Canadian public institutions such as the Royal Ontario Museum, the Ontario Science Centre, the Federation of Ontario Naturalists, the National Museum, the Museum of Nature, World Wildlife, and the National Hockey League.

Kids Can Press books have received critical acclaim and numerous nominations and awards. Some highlights include:

- Winning the Governor General's Award for English-language children's literature in 2011 for Cybèle Young's Ten Birds
- Franklin the Turtle series of stamps issued by Canada Post in May 2012, on the 25th anniversary of the publication of the first Franklin book
- Winning both Governor General's Award for English-language children's literature in 2008 for John Ibbitson’s The Landing (English-language text) and Stéphane Jorisch’s The Owl and the Pussycat (illustration)
- Mélanie Watt's multiple award-winning Scaredy Squirrel series
- The Independent Publisher Book Award for If the World Were a Village by David J. Smith
- Ryan and Jimmy and the Well in Africa That Brought Them Together by Herb Shoveller, a featured selection on Oprah.com
- Receiving a Kirkus Reviews starred review for My Name Is Elizabeth! by Annika Dunklee

== See also ==
- One Hen
