= Harry Rintoul =

Canadian playwright and theatre director

Harry Rintoul (December 9, 1956 – January 14, 2002) was a Canadian playwright and theatre director. He was best known for his 1990 play Brave Hearts, which was noted as one of the first significant plays in Canadian theatre history to address gay themes in a rural setting.

== Early life ==
Born in Canmore, Alberta, Rintoul moved to Winnipeg, Manitoba, in childhood. As a young adult he moved to Regina, Saskatchewan, for a time, during which he began writing Brave Hearts, but then moved back to Winnipeg and founded Theatre Projects Manitoba. He met his wife in Winnipeg, and they moved to rural Manitoba and had a daughter.

== Career ==
The first production of Brave Hearts was staged by Buddies in Bad Times in Toronto, where it was a Dora Mavor Moore Award nominee for Outstanding New Play, Small Theatre Division in 1991. In 1992, Brave Hearts was included in Making Out, the first significant anthology of gay-themed Canadian plays, alongside works by David Demchuk, Sky Gilbert, Daniel MacIvor, Colin Thomas and Ken Garnhum; in 2006, it appeared in the anthology Perfectly Abnormal: Seven Gay Plays, alongside plays by Greg Kearney, Shawn Postoff, Christian Lloyd, Greg MacArthur, Ken Brand and Michael Achtman.

Rintoul's other plays included Life and Times, Refugees, Montana, Jack of Hearts, Between Then and Now, The Convergence of Luke and Lake Nowhere.

== Harry S. Rintoul Memorial Award ==
Following his death in 2002, the Manitoba Association of Playwrights established an annual Harry S. Rintoul Memorial Award, presented to the year's best play by a Manitoba writer at the Winnipeg Fringe Theatre Festival.
