= Perrine Leblanc =

Canadian writer from Quebec (born 1980)

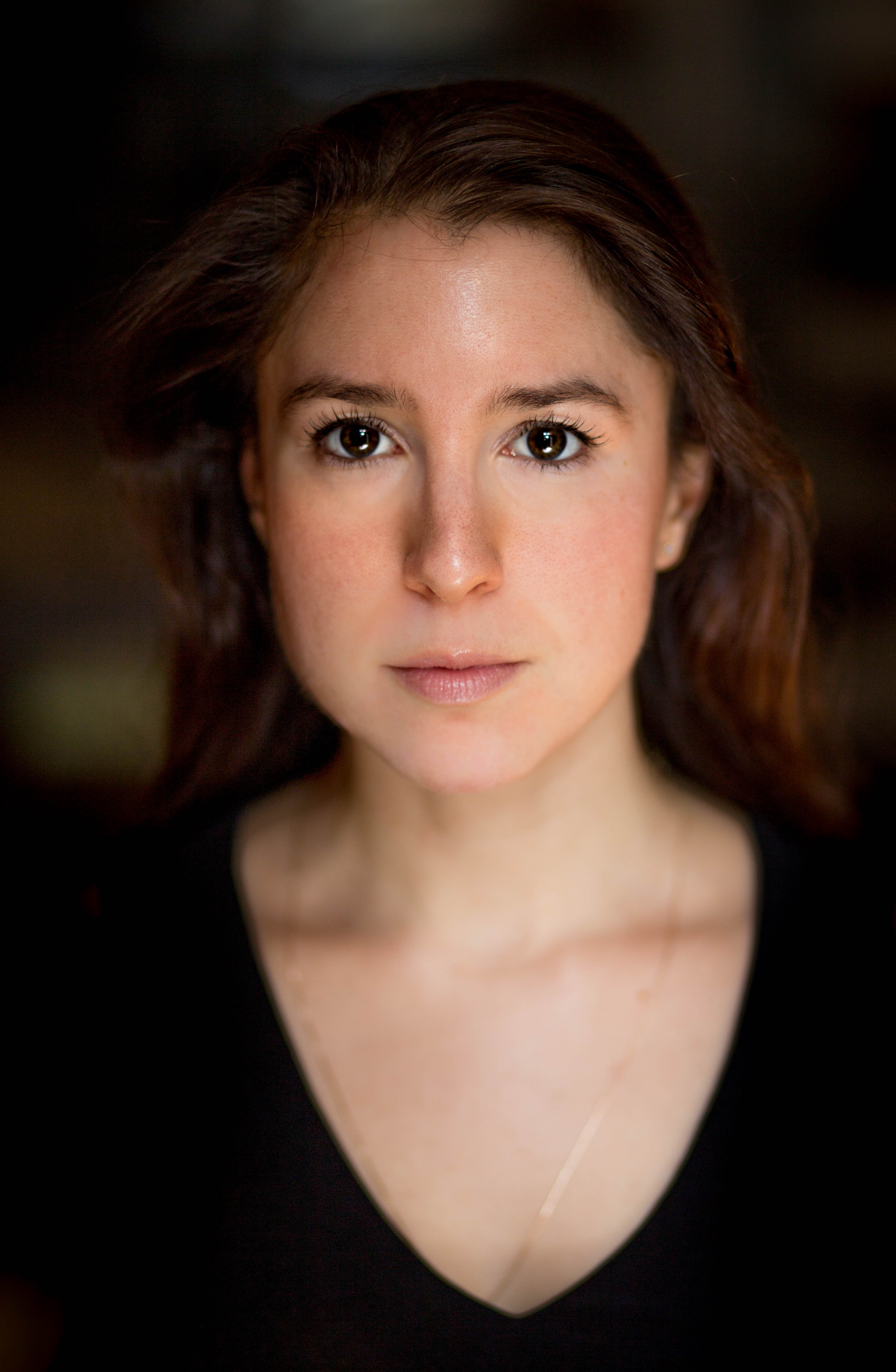
- Perrine Leblanc, Canadian writer from Quebec.
- Born: 1980 (age 45–46); Montreal, Quebec
- Occupation: novelist
- Writing career
- Period: 2010s-present
- Notable work: L'homme blanc
- Website: perrineleblanc.com

Perrine Leblanc (born 1980 in Montreal) is a Canadian writer from Quebec. Her debut novel L'homme blanc, published in 2010, won the 2010 Grand prix du livre de Montréal, the Governor General's Award for French-language fiction at the 2011 Governor General's Awards, and the 2011 edition of Le Combat des livres.

Leblanc studied at the Université Laval and the Université de Montréal, and worked as an editor with Éditions Leméac in Montreal before publishing L'homme blanc. Following the novel's commercial and award success, a revised edition was published in France in 2011 under the title Kolia.

Her second novel, Malabourg, was published in 2014.

== English translations ==
Kolia, 2013, House of Anansi Press.
The Lake, 2015, House of Anansi Press.
