= David Demchuk =

Canadian playwright and novelist

David Demchuk is a Canadian playwright and novelist, who received a Scotiabank Giller Prize nomination in 2017 for his debut novel The Bone Mother.

== Life ==
Born in Winnipeg, Manitoba, of Ukrainian descent, he moved to Toronto, Ontario, in 1984.

== Literary work ==
His plays include Rosalie Sings Alone (1985), If Betty Should Rise (1985), Touch (1986), The World We Live On Turns So That the Sun Appears to Rise (1987), Stay (1990), Mattachine (1991), Thieves in the Night (1992) and The Power of Invention. He received a special Dora Mavor Moore Award in 1986 for Touch. In 1992, Touch was included in Making Out, the first anthology of Canadian plays by gay writers, alongside works by Ken Garnhum, Sky Gilbert, Daniel MacIvor, Harry Rintoul and Colin Thomas.

After the mid-1990s, Demchuk stopped writing new plays, concentrating on his work at the Canadian Broadcasting Corporation and on writing scripts for radio, film and television. In 1999, he wrote the radio drama Alice in Cyberspace, a contemporary reworking of Alice's Adventures in Wonderland, which aired for ten episodes on CBC Radio's This Morning. His other radio dramas included Alaska, The Island of Dr. Moreau and The Winter Market. In June 2012, he became a contributing writer for the online magazine Torontoist.

The Bone Mother was published in 2017 by ChiZine Publications. It was the first horror novel to receive a nomination for the Giller Prize. The book was a finalist for the 2018 Amazon.ca First Novel Award. His novel RED X, published by Strange Light (an imprint of Penguin Random House), was released on August 31, 2021.

== Bibliography ==
=== Plays ===
- —— (1985). Rosalie Sings Alone.
- —— (1985). If Betty Should Rise.
- —— (1986). Touch.
- —— (1987). The World We Live On Turns So That the Sun Appears to Rise.
- —— (1990). Stay.
- —— (1991). Mattachine.
- —— (1992). Thieves in the Night.

=== Novels ===
- —— (2017). The Bone Mother. ChiZine Publications. ISBN 9781771484213.
- —— (2021). RED X. Strange Light. ISBN 9780771025013.
- ——; Clark, Corinne Leigh (2025). The Butcher's Daughter: The Hitherto Untold Story of Mrs. Lovett. Hell's Hundred. ISBN 9781641296427.
