= Maryse Warda =

Egyptian Canadian translator (born 1961)

Maryse Warda (born 1961) is an Egyptian Canadian translator. She primarily translates English plays of Canadian origin into French. Her work has been described as "faithful to the original with an unostentatious use of Quebec idiom."

== Biography ==
Warda was born in Cairo, Egypt, but immigrated to Montreal, Quebec, Canada, with her parents at the age of 9. She first learned English from watching Happy Days on television. She graduated from the Université de Montréal with a degree in English literature. At the time, she did not intend to pursue a career in translation. In 1991, she began working as an assistant at the Théâtre de Quat’Sous under Pierre Bernard. Bernard persuaded her to translate her first play, Brilliant Traces by Cindy Lou Johnson. This was a success, earning her a Prix de la critique nomination from the Association québécoise des critiques de théâtre. She went on to translate several other plays during her tenure there, such as Cindy Lou Johnson's The Years (Les années), Brad Fraser's The Ugly Man (L'homme laid), and Philip Ridley's Pitchfork Disney. She left the Théâtre de Quat'Sous in 2001. In 2002, she began working for the National Theatre School of Canada as associate director general.

Warda was nominated for the Governor General's Award for English to French translation in 2001 for her translation of George F. Walker's Suburban Motel as Motel de passage, and later won the award in 2011 for her translation of Greg MacArthur's The Toxic Bus Incident as Toxique ou l’incident dans l’autobus.

In 2015, Warda's translation into French of Erin Shields’ If We Were Birds was used in a production of the play directed by Geneviève L. Blais.

Warda lives in the Plateau-Mont-Royal borough of Montreal with her husband, actor Benoît Gouin.

== Awards and nominations ==
Year	Nominated work	Award	Category	Result	Ref.
1992	Traces d'étoiles	Prix de la Critique de l'Association québécoise des critiques de théâtre	Meilleur traduction	Nominated	
1996	Variations sur un temps	Masque	Traduction	Nominated	
2001	Motel de passage	Governor General's Award	English to French translation	Nominated	
2001	Motel de passage	Masque	Traduction	Won	
2006	Wit	Masque	Traduction	Nominated	
2011	Toxique ou l'incident dans l'autobus	Governor General's Award	English to French translation	Won	

== Selected works ==
=== Translated plays ===
- Traces d’étoiles (1992) – written by Cindy Lou Johnson, directed by Pierre Bernard. First produced by Théâtre de Quat'Sous.
- L'homme laid (1993) – written by Brad Fraser, directed by Pierre Bernard. First produced by Théâtre de Quat'Sous.
- Pitchfork Disney (1994) – written by Philip Ridley, directed by Marie-Louise Leblanc. First produced by Théâtre de Quat'Sous.
- Les années (1995) – written by Cindy Lou Johnson, directed by Pierre Bernard. First produced by Théâtre de Quat'Sous.
- Variations sur un temps (1996) – written by David Ives, directed by Pierre Bernard. First produced by Théâtre de Quat’Sous.
- Le cryptogramme (1996) – written by David Mamet, directed by Denise Guilbault. First produced by Théâtre de Quat'Sous.
- Motel de passage (1998) – written by George F. Walker, directed by Pierre Bernard, Denise Guilbault, and Denis Bernard. First produced by Théâtre de Quat’Sous.
- La chambre bleue (2001) – written by David Hare, directed by Serge Denoncourt. First produced by Théâtre du Rideau Vert.
- Une si belle chose (2001) – written by Jonathan Harvey, directed by Eric Dean. First produced by Théâtre du Rideau Vert.
- Comme en Alaska (2005) – written by Harold Pinter, directed by Estelle Clareton. First produced by Théâtre de Quat'Sous.
- Wit (2006) – written by Margaret Edson, directed by Denise Guilbault. First produced by Théâtre de Quat'Sous.
- Les mondes possibles (2008) – written by John Mighton, directed by Arianna Bardesono. First produced by Théâtre de Quat'Sous.
- Yellow Moon (2010) – written by David Greig, directed by Sylvain Bélanger. First produced by La Manufacture.
- Anna sous les tropiques (2011) – written by Nilo Cruz, directed by Jean LeClerc. First produced by Théâtre de Rideau Vert.
- Vigile (ou Le veilleur) (2012) – written by Morris Panych, directed by Martin Faucher. First produced by Théâtre de Rideau Vert.
- L'éclipse (2012) – written by Joyce Carol Oates, directed by Carmen Jolin. First produced by Théâtre Prospero.
- Ce moment-là (2012) – written by Deirdre Kinahan, directed by Denis Bernard. First produced by La Manufacture.
- Du bon monde (2012) – written by David Lindsay-Abaire, directed by Pierre Bernard. First produced by Jean-Duceppe Company.
- La Vénus au vison (2013) – written by David Ives, directed Michel Poirier. First produced by Jean-Duceppe Company.
- Peter et Alice (2014) – written by John Logan, directed by Hugo Bélanger. First produced by Jean-Duceppe Company.
- Si les oiseaux (2015) – written by Erin Shields, directed by Geneviève L. Blais. First produced by Théâtre Prospero.

=== Published translated plays ===
- Toxique (2011) – written by Greg MacArthur
- Traces d’étoiles (2011) – written by Cindy Lou Johnson
- Bye Bye Baby (2009) – written by Elyse Gasco
- Motel de passage, volumes 1 & 2 (2001–2002) – written by George F. Walker
