= Demonology 101 =

Webcomic by Faith Erin Hicks

- Author: Faith Erin Hicks
- Website: faith.rydia.net
- Current status/schedule: Concluded
- Launch date: August 1999
- End date: June 2004
- Genre: Fantasy/Drama

Demonology 101 (sometimes abbreviated as D101) is a webcomic written and drawn by Faith Erin Hicks from August 1999 to June 2004. It tells the story of Raven, a 16-year-old demon being raised by a human in ordinary human society. Hicks' first public work gained attention as an early story-focused webcomic, and ran for 700 pages before being concluded.

== Development ==
Hicks was inspired by Buffy the Vampire Slayer in the creation of her first webcomic, alongside Jeff Smith's comic Bone and the Gabriel Knight video game series. Hicks launched Demonology 101 in August 1999 with its first episode. By 2003, the webcomic consisted of five self-contained stories. Hicks redrew the entirety of Episode 1 in 2002. Demonology 101 is manga-influenced, and nearly the entire webcomic is rendered in black-and-white with heavy grey shading. Hicks drew her webcomic on printer paper she took from her parents.

Hicks completed Demonology 101 in 2004, after having created 700 pages. After the conclusion of Episode Five, Hicks also wrote two short character-based stories, as well as a flashback webcomic titled A Distant Faith.

Because there were relatively few story-focused webcomics available in the late 1990s and early 2000s, Demonology 101 very quickly acquired a small readership anticipating its weekly update. Hicks was very critical of her own art, but later said that Demonology 101 "was so important to me. ... it was all mine and that was wonderful."

== Synopsis ==
Demonology 101 is centered on seemingly "normal" girl named Raven, who is actually a 16-year-old demon who had been adopted by a human. Raised in isolation, Raven is eager to join the outside world and enrolls in high school. Although Raven is nominally the main character, the supporting cast is well-developed, adding depth to the world and highlighting the themes of the webcomic. The character Raven is mainly concerned with figuring out her own nature and fate, and Demonology 101 largely explores these questions through her family ties and relationships. Demonology 101 also explores the ideas of "good" and "evil" through its complex cast of characters.

== Awards ==
Demonology 101 won two Web Cartoonists' Choice Awards in 2004, in the categories "Outstanding Dramatic Comic" and "Outstanding Long Form Comic".
