= Friends with Boys =

2012 graphic novel by Faith Erin Hicks

Friends With Boys
- First edition paperback cover
- Author: Faith Erin Hicks
- Genre: Graphic novel
- Published: 2012, First Second Books
- Media type: Print, webcomic
- Pages: 224 pages
- ISBN: 1596435569

Friends with Boys is a 2012 graphic novel and webcomic by Faith Erin Hicks. The book was first published on February 28, 2012, through First Second Books. The company, who had licensed the work prior to its release in any format, gave Hicks permission to post the book online as a webcomic prior to its publication.

== Synopsis ==
All of her life Maggie has been homeschooled, so when the time comes for her to attend public high school she is understandably nervous. Her many brothers have adapted to public school with few problems, but Maggie can't help but feel a little like a fish out of water. She manages to make friends with Lucy, but Maggie has other problems. Namely the silent ghost who is supposedly the widow of the captain of the "Reaper" that has constantly followed Maggie around since she was a little girl.

== Production ==
Hicks drew inspiration for Friends with Boys from her own personal experiences with her brothers and with homeschooling. Of the experience of drawing from her own history for the characters, Hicks commented that it was "frustrating to relive the social issues I had in high school, and realize that a lot of them were due to me having so little experience interacting with my peers." After completing the graphic novel, Hicks requested that her publisher allow her to publish it online in webcomic format, as she felt that it would help reach more readers and potentially increase sales for the work. First Second Books agreed to this and Hicks published the graphic novel online until the release date of the print edition, at which point Hicks removed it from her website.

== Reception ==
Critical reception for Friends with Boys has been positive. Kelly Thompson of Comic Book Resources noted that the work showed how Hicks's skill and writing has matured and improved, and remarked that the work was "so good it leaves one simply excited to see what she'll do next." The New York Times also gave the work a positive review, writing that it was "a fundamentally sweet and sensitive story, one with a rare, genuine-feeling portrait of loving sibling relations."

=== Awards ===
- Great Graphic Novels Top Ten 2013 from YALSA
