= One Hen =

Educational organizations based in the United States

- Formation: January 2009
- Founders: Katie Smith Milway; Lisa Henderson; Karen Schultz
- Type: Non-profit (501C3) organisation
- Purpose: Humanitarian entrepreneurial finance
- Location: Jamaica Plain, Massachusetts
- Services: Educational resources for micro-finance
- Director: Dwayne Simmons
- Director of Technology: Sree Balamurugesh

One Hen is a service-learning program, located in Jamaica Plain, Massachusetts. It was established in January 2009 as an outgrowth of the 2008 children's book One Hen: How One Small Loan Made a Big Difference.

Through One Hen and a website of free games and activities, young people (grades K-8) are challenged to start their own small businesses. One Hen works with national and international educators, schools, community centers, and through the partnership with educational organizations such as BELL, Citizen Schools, and National Heritage Academies to implement its One Hen curriculum.

== History ==
One Hen is built upon the global lessons of children's book One Hen: How One Small Loan Made a Big Difference and the original interactive website www.onehen.org, which was developed as a pro bono project by Sapient Interactive, the marketing services group of Sapient Nitro, and Bain & Company's Community Works program.

In September 2008 a group of four women met at Babson College, along with other volunteers, and founded One Hen, Inc. All of these volunteers had taken leadership roles in the educational movement that had evolved from the book One Hen and its accompanying website. They formed a volunteer management team and in January 2009, One Hen, Inc. was registered as a 501(c)(3) organization.

During the spring of 2009, in response to widespread educator interest, the One Hen team worked with teachers from the JFK Elementary School in Canton, Massachusetts to develop One Hen Academy. Educators were eager to teach social entrepreneurship and the value of giving in their classrooms. This collaboration earned One Hen and the JFK a feature on ABC news with Charlie Gibson in May 2009.

In July 2009, the first One Hen summer program piloted with 100 students in Boston in partnership with BELL (Building Educated Leaders for Life). In 2010, One Hen expanded with partner BELL and worked with City Year to reach 2,100 children in five other cities (Boston, Detroit, Baltimore, New York and Augusta, GA).

In 2011, One Hen refined the curriculum for 6th grade and expanded the program to middle school students, extending program implementation to charter school network National Heritage Academies. In just one year this partnership grew from 400 students to nearly 2,000 students.

In the fall of 2012 One Hen developed an afterschool program, adjusting the curriculum to meet the needs of the extended day population in partnership with Citizen Schools and Boston Scores. This Boston focused programming was piloted across a number of Boston Public Schools middle schools during the 2012-13 academic year.

On September 1, 2016: One Hen announced the acquisition of its flagship program and related infrastructure by Boston Scores, a top Boston youth development organization and One Hen partner since 2012. Established in 1999, Boston Scores partners with Boston Public School teachers to offer under-served students programs that develop the whole child.

== The Book ==
One Hen: How One Small Loan Made a Big Difference is written by Katie Smith Milway. The book is published by Kids Can Press and is illustrated by Eugenie Fernandes. Based on the true story of Dr. Kwabena Darko, the book follows the life of a West African boy, Kojo, who receives a small loan to buy a hen, and takes flight as an entrepreneur. He moves gradually from poverty, to well-being, to provider who creates opportunities for others. It's a story of how the world undergoes change one person, one family, and one community at a time.

Since its publication in the spring of 2008, One Hen has won accolades for its story and illustrations, including:

- 2009 The Canadian Children's Book Centre (CCBC) finalists Norma Fleck Award for Canadian Children's Non-Fiction
- 2009 Children's Africana Best Book Award
- 2009 Massachusetts Book Award
- 2009 US Board of Books for Young People's "2009 Outstanding International Book List"
- 2009 International Readers Association– Global Society Award
- 2008 Best Bets for Children and Teens–Ontario Librarians Association
