= List of accolades received by The Last of Us =

Awards received by 2013 video game

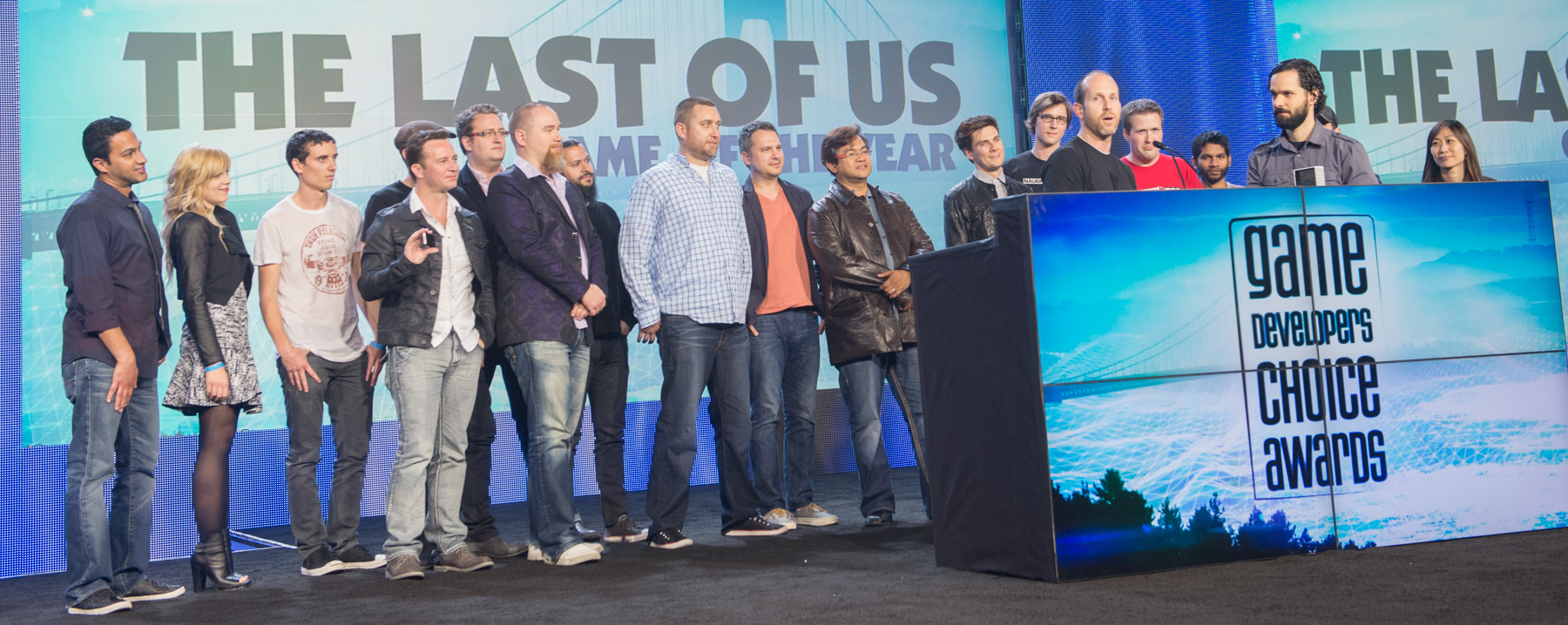
Naughty Dog developers accepting Game of the Year at the Game Developers Choice Awards

The Last of Us is a 2013 action-adventure game developed by Naughty Dog and published by Sony Computer Entertainment. Players assume control of Joel (Troy Baker), escorting the young Ellie (Ashley Johnson) across a post-apocalyptic United States. The game's development was led by Bruce Straley and Neil Druckmann, as game director and creative director, respectively. The game was officially announced on December 10, 2011, and was nominated for Most Anticipated Game at the 2012 Spike Video Game Awards. Following its previews at E3 2012, the game won five awards at the Game Critics Awards, including Best of Show, which it also won from several gaming publications.

The game was released for PlayStation 3 on June 14, 2013, and for PlayStation 4 as The Last of Us Remastered in July and August 2014. It received "universal acclaim", according to review aggregator Metacritic, based on 98 reviews. Within three weeks of its release, The Last of Us sold approximately 3.4 million copies, and seven million by July 2014, becoming one of the best-selling PlayStation 3 games. The game received six nominations at the Golden Joystick Awards, of which it won three, and seven nominations at Spike VGX, with Baker and Johnson winning Best Voice Actor and Best Voice Actress, respectively.

The Last of Us won Best Animated Video Game at the 41st Annie Awards, and Outstanding Achievement in Videogame Writing at the 66th Writers Guild of America Awards. It led the 17th Annual D.I.C.E. Awards with thirteen nominations and ten awards, including Game of the Year, received five nominations at the 3rd Annual New York Game Awards, of which it won the Big Apple Award for Best Game, and won four of its seven nominations at the SXSW Gaming Awards, including Game of the Year. At the 10th British Academy Video Games Awards, The Last of Us received ten nominations and won five awards: Best Game, Action & Adventure, Audio Achievement, Performer, and Story. At the 14th Annual Game Developers Choice Awards, it won Game of the Year, Best Design, and Best Narrative. It received nine nominations at the 12th Annual Game Audio Network Guild Awards, of which it won four: Audio of the Year, Sound Design of the Year, Best Audio Mix, and Best Dialogue.

The game appeared on several publications' year-end lists of the best games, including The A.V. Club, The Daily Telegraph, GamesRadar, GameTrailers, GameRevolution, Giant Bomb, Good Game, Hardcore Gamer, IGN, Kotaku, VG247, and VideoGamer.com. The Last of Us Remastered received nominations at The Game Awards 2014 and the 15th Annual Game Developers Choice Awards. The game was named among the best games of the 2010s by The Hollywood Reporter, Mashable, Metacritic, and VG247, and was added to the World Video Game Hall of Fame at the Strong National Museum of Play in May 2023. It is often ranked among the greatest video games ever made.

== Accolades ==
Accolades
Award	Date	Category	Recipient(s) and nominee(s)	Result	Ref.
Game Critics Awards	June 26, 2012	Best of Show	The Last of Us	Won	
Game Critics Awards	June 26, 2012	Best Original Game	The Last of Us	Won	
Game Critics Awards	June 26, 2012	Best Console Game	The Last of Us	Won	
Game Critics Awards	June 26, 2012	Best Action/Adventure Game	The Last of Us	Won	
Game Critics Awards	June 26, 2012	Best Sound	The Last of Us	Won	
Spike Video Game Awards	December 7, 2012	Most Anticipated Game	The Last of Us	Nominated	
Golden Joystick Awards	October 26, 2013	Best Newcomer	The Last of Us	Won	
Golden Joystick Awards	October 26, 2013	Best Storytelling	The Last of Us	Won	
Golden Joystick Awards	October 26, 2013	Studio of the Year	Naughty Dog	Won	
Golden Joystick Awards	October 26, 2013	Game of the Year	The Last of Us	Nominated	
Golden Joystick Awards	October 26, 2013	Best Visual Design	The Last of Us	Nominated	
Golden Joystick Awards	October 26, 2013	Best Gaming Moment	"Joel's loss"	Nominated	
Spike VGX	December 7, 2013	Studio of the Year	Naughty Dog	Won	
Spike VGX	December 7, 2013	Best PlayStation Game	The Last of Us	Won	
Spike VGX	December 7, 2013	Best Voice Actor	Troy Baker as Joel	Won	
Spike VGX	December 7, 2013	Best Voice Actress	Ashley Johnson as Ellie	Won	
Spike VGX	December 7, 2013	Game of the Year	The Last of Us	Nominated	
Spike VGX	December 7, 2013	Best Action Adventure Game	The Last of Us	Nominated	
Spike VGX	December 7, 2013	Best Soundtrack	The Last of Us	Nominated	
Annie Awards	February 1, 2014	Best Animated Video Game	The Last of Us	Won	
Writers Guild of America Awards	February 1, 2014	Outstanding Achievement in Videogame Writing	Neil Druckmann	Won	
D.I.C.E. Awards	February 7, 2014	Game of the Year	The Last of Us	Won	
D.I.C.E. Awards	February 7, 2014	Adventure Game of the Year	The Last of Us	Won	
D.I.C.E. Awards	February 7, 2014	Outstanding Innovation in Gaming	The Last of Us	Won	
D.I.C.E. Awards	February 7, 2014	Outstanding Achievement in Game Direction	The Last of Us	Won	
D.I.C.E. Awards	February 7, 2014	Outstanding Achievement in Animation	The Last of Us	Won	
D.I.C.E. Awards	February 7, 2014	Outstanding Achievement in Art Direction	The Last of Us	Won	
D.I.C.E. Awards	February 7, 2014	Outstanding Achievement in Sound Design	The Last of Us	Won	
D.I.C.E. Awards	February 7, 2014	Outstanding Achievement in Story	The Last of Us	Won	
D.I.C.E. Awards	February 7, 2014	Outstanding Achievement in Visual Engineering	The Last of Us	Won	
D.I.C.E. Awards	February 7, 2014	Outstanding Character Performance	Ashley Johnson as Ellie	Won	
D.I.C.E. Awards	February 7, 2014	Outstanding Character Performance	Troy Baker as Joel	Nominated	
D.I.C.E. Awards	February 7, 2014	Online Game of the Year	The Last of Us	Nominated	
D.I.C.E. Awards	February 7, 2014	Outstanding Achievement in Gameplay Engineering	The Last of Us	Nominated	
New York Game Awards	February 11, 2014	Big Apple Award for Best Game	The Last of Us	Won	
New York Game Awards	February 11, 2014	Herman Melville Award for Best Writing in a Game	The Last of Us	Nominated	
New York Game Awards	February 11, 2014	Tin Pan Alley Award for Best Music in a Game	The Last of Us	Nominated	
New York Game Awards	February 11, 2014	Statue of Liberty Award for Best World	Salt Lake City	Nominated	
New York Game Awards	February 11, 2014	Great White Way Award for Best Overall Acting	Troy Baker as Joel	Nominated	
SXSW Gaming Awards	March 8, 2014	Game of the Year	The Last of Us	Won	
SXSW Gaming Awards	March 8, 2014	Excellence in Narrative	The Last of Us	Won	
SXSW Gaming Awards	March 8, 2014	Excellence in SFX	The Last of Us	Won	
SXSW Gaming Awards	March 8, 2014	Excellence in Musical Score	The Last of Us	Won	
SXSW Gaming Awards	March 8, 2014	Excellence in Gameplay	The Last of Us	Nominated	
SXSW Gaming Awards	March 8, 2014	Excellence in Animation	The Last of Us	Nominated	
SXSW Gaming Awards	March 8, 2014	Convergence Award	The Last of Us	Nominated	
British Academy Video Games Awards	March 12, 2014	Best Game	The Last of Us	Won	
British Academy Video Games Awards	March 12, 2014	Action & Adventure	The Last of Us	Won	
British Academy Video Games Awards	March 12, 2014	Audio Achievement	The Last of Us	Won	
British Academy Video Games Awards	March 12, 2014	Performer	Ashley Johnson as Ellie	Won	
British Academy Video Games Awards	March 12, 2014	Performer	Troy Baker as Joel	Nominated	
British Academy Video Games Awards	March 12, 2014	Artistic Achievement	The Last of Us	Nominated	
British Academy Video Games Awards	March 12, 2014	Game Design	The Last of Us	Nominated	
British Academy Video Games Awards	March 12, 2014	Multiplayer	The Last of Us	Nominated	
British Academy Video Games Awards	March 12, 2014	Music	The Last of Us	Nominated	
British Academy Video Games Awards	March 12, 2014	Story	The Last of Us	Won	
Game Developers Choice Awards	March 19, 2014	Game of the Year	The Last of Us	Won	
Game Developers Choice Awards	March 19, 2014	Best Design	The Last of Us	Won	
Game Developers Choice Awards	March 19, 2014	Best Narrative	The Last of Us	Won	
Game Developers Choice Awards	March 19, 2014	Best Technology	The Last of Us	Nominated	
Game Developers Choice Awards	March 19, 2014	Best Visual Art	The Last of Us	Nominated	
Game Audio Network Guild Awards	March 20, 2014	Audio of the Year	The Last of Us	Won	
Game Audio Network Guild Awards	March 20, 2014	Sound Design of the Year	The Last of Us	Won	
Game Audio Network Guild Awards	March 20, 2014	Best Audio Mix	The Last of Us	Won	
Game Audio Network Guild Awards	March 20, 2014	Best Dialogue	The Last of Us	Won	
Game Audio Network Guild Awards	March 20, 2014	Music of the Year	The Last of Us	Nominated	
Game Audio Network Guild Awards	March 20, 2014	Best Soundtrack Album	The Last of Us	Nominated	
Game Audio Network Guild Awards	March 20, 2014	Best Interactive Score	The Last of Us	Nominated	
Game Audio Network Guild Awards	March 20, 2014	Best Cinematic/Cut-Scene Audio	The Last of Us	Nominated	
Game Audio Network Guild Awards	March 20, 2014	Best Original Instrumental	"Main Theme"	Nominated	
The Game Awards	December 5, 2014	Best Remaster	The Last of Us Remastered	Nominated	
Game Developers Choice Awards	March 4, 2015	Best Technology	The Last of Us Remastered	Honorable Mention	
Golden Joystick Awards	November 22, 2022	PlayStation Game of the Year	The Last of Us Part I	Nominated	
The Game Awards	December 8, 2022	Innovation in Accessibility	The Last of Us Part I	Nominated	
Visual Effects Society Awards	February 15, 2023	Outstanding Visual Effects in a Real-Time Project	Erick Pangilinan, Evan Wells, Eben Cook, Mary Jane Whiting	Won	
British Academy Games Awards	March 30, 2023	Technical Achievement	The Last of Us Part I	Nominated	
Clio Entertainment Awards	November 9, 2023	Games: Audio / Visual	The Last of Us Part I Launch Trailer	Gold	
The Steam Awards	January 2, 2024	Best Soundtrack Award	The Last of Us Part I	Won	
