= The Last of Us: Left Behind =

2014 video game

- Developer: Naughty Dog
- Publisher: Sony Computer Entertainment
- Directors: Bruce Straley; Neil Druckmann
- Designer: Jacob Minkoff
- Programmers: Travis McIntosh; Jason Gregory
- Artist: Erick Pangilinan
- Writer: Neil Druckmann
- Composer: Gustavo Santaolalla
- Series: The Last of Us
- Platforms: PlayStation 3; PlayStation 4
- Release: PlayStation 3: WW: February 14, 2014; PlayStation 4: NA: July 29, 2014; PAL: July 30, 2014; UK: August 1, 2014
- Genre: Action-adventure
- Mode: Single-player

The Last of Us: Left Behind is a 2014 action-adventure game developed by Naughty Dog and published by Sony Computer Entertainment. It is an expansion pack to the 2013 game The Last of Us. Set in a post-apocalyptic world, the game switches between two stories: the first, set three weeks before the events of The Last of Us, follows Ellie as she spends time with her best friend Riley in an abandoned mall in Boston; the second takes place between two chapters of The Last of Us and focuses on Ellie's attempts to scour an abandoned mall in Colorado for medical supplies to heal Joel while dealing with enemies.

The game is played from a third-person perspective; players use firearms, improvised weapons, and stealth to defend against hostile humans and zombie-like creatures infected by a mutated strain of the Cordyceps fungus. Players can use "Listen Mode" to locate enemies through a heightened sense of hearing and spatial awareness. The game also features a crafting system, allowing players to customize weapons through the upgrades. Development began after the release of The Last of Us in June 2013. The developers immediately decided to focus the narrative on Ellie, as they felt players were interested in experiencing more of her story.

Left Behind was released as downloadable content for The Last of Us for the PlayStation 3 in February 2014; it was later bundled with The Last of Us Remastered for the PlayStation 4 in July 2014, (Note: The Last of Us Remastered was released on different dates, dependent on territory: July 29, 2014 in North America; July 30, 2014 in Europe, Australia and New Zealand; and August 1, 2014 in the United Kingdom and Ireland.) and released as a stand-alone expansion pack for both consoles in May 2015. A remake was included in The Last of Us Part I for the PlayStation 5 in September 2022 and Windows in March 2023. The game received generally favorable reviews by critics, who praised its story, characterization, level design, and depiction of female and LGBT characters. It received several accolades. The story of Left Behind was adapted in the seventh episode of the television series The Last of Us in February 2023.

== Gameplay ==
The gameplay of The Last of Us: Left Behind is similar to the basic gameplay of The Last of Us. It is an action-adventure game that uses a third-person perspective. The game involves gunfights, melee combat, and a cover system. Players control Ellie. An added feature in combat is the ability to focus the attention of the Infected towards human enemies, by throwing objects to distract them. This results in a lower number of enemies to encounter, giving players a tactical advantage. Throughout the flashback section, players encounter locations and activities around the mall, such as a carousel, photo booth, video arcade, mask store, and water guns. All of these locations and activities have some level of interactivity, allowing players to use them in different ways; for example, the photo booth allows players to select different poses to strike for a picture, while using the water guns prompts players to engage Riley in a water gun fight.

== Plot ==
After an ambush leaves Joel (Troy Baker) severely injured, Ellie (Ashley Johnson) searches an abandoned mall in Colorado for supplies to heal him. She discovers a medical kit in a derelict military helicopter that has crashed through the roof. Making her way back to the unconscious Joel, Ellie must deal with the Infected and members of the hostile human group who injured Joel in the first place. She fights her way back to Joel, treats his injury, and takes him to a hideout to see out the worsening winter.

Months earlier, three weeks before Ellie meets Joel, Riley Abel (Yaani King) surprises her at their Boston military boarding school after running away over a month ago. She reveals she has joined the Fireflies, a revolutionary militia group, and takes Ellie to explore an abandoned mall. They have fun with a carousel, photo booth, arcade, and Halloween store before having a water gun fight. Riley reveals she has been assigned to a group of Fireflies in a different city, but broke the rules to come and see Ellie one last time. The girls argue, but Ellie eventually tells Riley she supports her decision as she knows Riley has wanted it for a long time.

Before they part ways, Riley plugs Ellie's Walkman into the sound system of an electronics store, and the two dance on a display case to Etta James's cover of "I Got You Babe". Ellie tearfully begs Riley not to leave; Riley agrees and rips her Firefly pendant off, prompting Ellie to kiss her. Riley responds positively, though the two are then chased by a horde of Infected alerted by the music. They outrun most of the Infected and kill the remainder, getting bitten in the process. They briefly consider shooting themselves to prevent the infection taking over them, but instead choose to spend their final hours together.

== Development ==
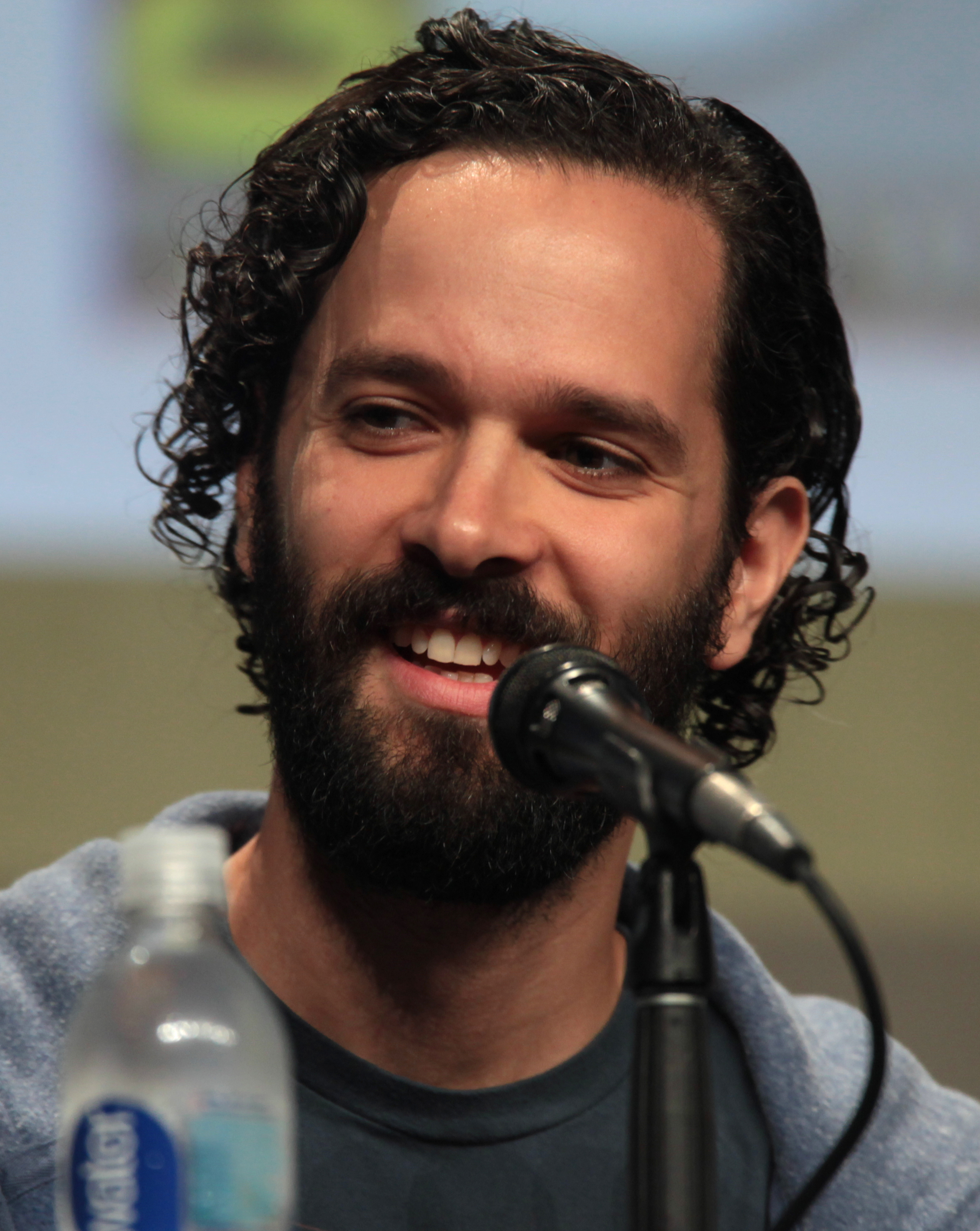
Creative director Neil Druckmann wrote the story for The Last of Us: Left Behind.

Naughty Dog began developing The Last of Us: Left Behind following the release of The Last of Us in June 2013, with a team about half the size. Following the decision to create single-player downloadable content for the game, the development team immediately decided that the story would focus on the character of Ellie; they found that players of The Last of Us were interested to learn about events in Ellie's life prior to the events of the main game, particularly the events involving Riley Abel, whom Ellie mentioned in The Last of Us. In addition, they found that some players were interested in the events that occurred between the Fall and Winter segments of the main game, in which Ellie cares for an injured Joel. This led to the team deciding to contrast these two events against each other, feeling it would help the story's pacing. Game director Bruce Straley said that the team felt the story justified the development of Left Behind.

Left Behind was written to focus on the relationship between Ellie and Riley, and to recount the events that defined their later personalities. Riley was chronologically introduced to Ellie in The Last of Us: American Dreams, a comic book written by creative director Neil Druckmann and artist Faith Erin Hicks. The team used the comic as a reference point when developing the relationship between Ellie and Riley, becoming particularly interested in having the chance to see more of their relationship; Druckmann felt that they would not have developed Left Behind if American Dreams hadn't been written. Druckmann felt that the story of Joel and Ellie's relationship in The Last of Us dealt with survival, loyalty and love, and that Ellie and Riley's relationship in Left Behind deals with similar themes. Straley felt that the themes involve love, loss and devotion, pondering the extent that one goes to protect those one cares about.

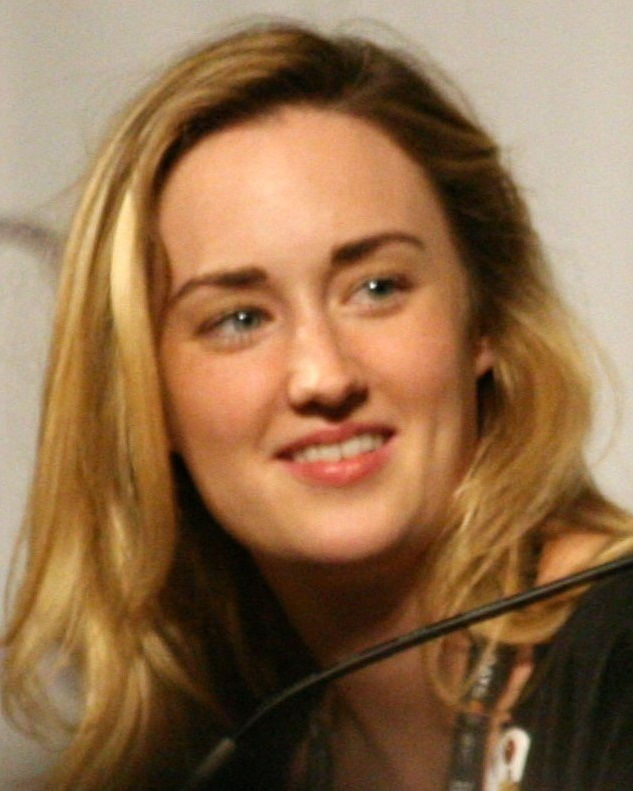
Ashley Johnson reprised her role as Ellie in Left Behind.

Ashley Johnson portrayed Ellie in Left Behind, reprising her role from The Last of Us. To portray Riley, the team cast Yaani King; Johnson has noted that it was interesting to act against someone different, and that King fit the role immediately. King felt intimidated to become part of a large project, and was worried about "fit[ting] in". The team found it interesting to tell the story of Riley, as players of The Last of Us were already aware of the effect that she had on Ellie; Left Behind sees Riley's behavior change Ellie, resulting in the latter's focus to fight in order to save those close to her. The team were also interested in Ellie's behavior around Riley; she is perceived as being more playful. In Left Behind, Ellie and Riley share a kiss; the team explored omitting the kiss from the game, but felt that it was imperative to the story, and that it strengthened the relationship. Though initially he only felt that Ellie viewed Riley as an influence, Druckmann later considered her romantic appeal, and decided to explore the concept.

While writing The Last of Us, Druckmann had a general idea of the events that would shape Ellie's identity; when conceiving the story direction for Left Behind, he found that these events were suitable. Druckmann felt that omitting the nature of the argument between Ellie and Riley, which took place prior to the events of the game, allowed players to draw their own conclusions. The team found various sections of the game interesting, such as the references to Facebook and Halloween, as the characters are unaware of their meaning.

The smaller time frame of development for Left Behind gave the team an opportunity to trial mechanics and ideas that they were unable to test on the main game. With the game's combat, an added feature was to allow players to focus the attention of the Infected towards human enemies, allowing an easier escape. The gameplay was also more focused on the characters, as opposed to the combat, to allow players to relate to them more. The gameplay sequences were designed to contrast with other moments of Ellie's life; for example, the water gun fight with Riley is contrasted to the gunfights with enemies. The team found that creating some gameplay mechanics was a challenge, with even fewer combat scenarios in Left Behind than in The Last of Us. The animation of the masks also presented a challenge, due to the number of joints; it took various iterations before the final design was implemented.

The Last of Us: Left Behind was released worldwide for the PlayStation 3 on February 14, 2014, as downloadable content for The Last of Us. It was later bundled with The Last of Us Remastered, an updated version of the game released for the PlayStation 4 on July 29, 2014. It was released as a standalone expansion pack for PlayStation 3 and PlayStation 4 on May 12, 2015. Left Behind was included in The Last of Us Part I, a remake of the original game, released on PlayStation 5 in September 2022, and on Windows in March 2023. Left Behind was adapted in the seventh episode of the television series The Last of Us, which aired on February 26, 2023.

== Reception ==
=== Critical response ===
Reception

Aggregate score
Aggregator	Score
Metacritic	88/100

Review scores
Publication	Score
Computer and Video Games	7/10
Electronic Gaming Monthly	8.5/10
Eurogamer	10/10
Game Informer	8.75/10
GameSpot	9/10
IGN	9/10
Polygon	8/10
VideoGamer.com	7/10

The Last of Us: Left Behind received "generally favorable reviews" from critics, according to review aggregator Metacritic, based on 69 reviews. Reviewers praised the character development, story and subtext, gameplay and combat, and depiction of female and LGBT characters.

Tom Mc Shea of GameSpot found the story insightful, and IGN's Colin Moriarty named it one of the game's standout features. Matt Helgeson of Game Informer wrote that the writing "shines", and that it significantly assisted with the development of the characters. Henry Gilbert of GamesRadar felt that the story was "intermittently intense, tragic, humorous, and even poignant". Polygon's Samit Sarkar wrote that Left Behind "serves as a terrific side story" to the main game, but is "even more impressive" when taken on its own merits. Nick Cowen of Computer and Video Games found the story "less satisfying" than The Last of Us due to its lack of new details about Ellie, but declared it "action-packed and enjoyable" nonetheless.

The characters—particularly the relationship between Ellie and Riley—received acclaim. Polygon's Philip Kollar appreciated the game's ability to portray realistic female characters, noting that they "aren't easy stereotypes", while GameSpot's Mc Shea felt new appreciation for Ellie by seeing her actions around Riley. Helgeson of Game Informer welcomed the addition of Riley, noting that she is "played with the same level of emotional depth and subtlety" as other characters. The Daily Telegraph's Tim Martin praised the "interplay" between the Ellie and Riley, and Eurogamer's Stace Harman felt that the game improves the understanding of Joel and Ellie's relationship. The character performances also received praise, with IGN's Moriarty and Kotaku's Kirk Hamilton noting that the game improved as a result.

Ellie and Riley's kiss in Left Behind received positive reactions from critics, who called it a "breakthrough moment" for video games.

The game received some positive reactions in relation to its depiction of LGBT characters. The kiss shared by Ellie and Riley was described by Kotaku's Hamilton as "video gaming's latest breakthrough moment" and "a big deal". Keza MacDonald of IGN wrote that the kiss was "so beautiful and natural and funny that [she] was left dumbstruck". Edward Smith of International Business Times felt that the kiss was "the first example of intimacy in a videogame that's meant anything", recognizing it as "an expression of both burgeoning teen sexuality and of ... friendship". Amplify, a project of the non-profit Advocates for Youth, reported that the kiss had attracted criticism from some players.

Many reviewers found the gameplay and combat a refreshing difference from other games. Eurogamer's Harman commended the game's ability to link the gameplay to the story, noting that it adds "diversity and dynamism". Helgeson of Game Informer praised the additional gameplay feature allowing players to force fights among the Infected and human enemies, naming such sequences "engaging", while Martin of The Daily Telegraph appreciated the game's ability to contextualize the combat sequences. However, some critics felt negatively about a gameplay sequence occurring late in the game, which requires players to kill a large number of enemies; GameSpot's Mc Shea noted that it felt "unnatural", and IGN's Moriarty called it "forced". Electronic Gaming Monthly's Eric L. Patterson wrote that players will feel "disappointed" if they play the game "more for the gameplay than the story".

The world and environments of the game drew acclaim from many reviewers. Polygon's Kollar called the game's locations "beautiful", while Eurogamer's Harman wrote that the level design significantly improved the environments. Moriarty of IGN praised the setting within the mall, due to its regularity in "the real, pre-apocalyptic world". Mc Shea of GameSpot also felt that the game's focus on exploration allowed the "well-realized environments [to] breathe", and Martin of The Daily Telegraph noted that Ellie's body size allowed for "quieter and faster" movement throughout the environments.

=== Accolades ===
The Last of Us: Left Behind received multiple nominations and awards from gaming publications. Following its release, GameSpot awarded Left Behind Game of the Month for February 2014. For the year 2014, the game was review aggregator GameRankings's highest-rated PlayStation 3 game, and Metacritic's third-highest-rated PlayStation 3 game. GameSpot nominated the game for Game of the Year, and awarded it PS3 Game of the Year. It received Most Valuable Add-On Content at the SXSW Gaming Awards, and Best DLC from Hardcore Gamer. The story received awards at the 11th British Academy Video Games Awards and the 67th Writers Guild of America Awards. Ellie won Most Valuable Character at the SXSW Gaming Awards, and Ashley Johnson's performance was awarded at the British Academy Video Games Awards. The game nominated for the Games for Change award at The Game Awards 2014, and the Matthew Crump Cultural Innovation Award at the SXSW Gaming Awards.

Date	Award	Category	Recipient(s) and nominee(s)	Result	Ref.
Golden Joystick Awards	October 24, 2014	Best Storytelling	The Last of Us: Left Behind	Won	
Golden Joystick Awards	October 24, 2014	Best Gaming Moment	The kiss	Won	
The Game Awards	December 5, 2014	Games for Change	The Last of Us: Left Behind	Nominated	
Writers Guild of America Awards	February 14, 2015	Outstanding Achievement in Videogame Writing	The Last of Us: Left Behind	Won	
British Academy Video Games Awards	March 12, 2015	Performer	Ashley Johnson as Ellie	Won	
British Academy Video Games Awards	March 12, 2015	Story	The Last of Us: Left Behind	Won	
SXSW Gaming Awards	March 14, 2015	Most Valuable Add-On Content	The Last of Us: Left Behind	Won	
SXSW Gaming Awards	March 14, 2015	Most Valuable Character	Ellie	Won	
SXSW Gaming Awards	March 14, 2015	Matthew Crump Cultural Innovation Award	The Last of Us: Left Behind	Nominated	
