= The Last of Us (video game) =

2013 video game

- Developer: Naughty Dog
- Publisher: Sony Computer Entertainment
- Directors: Bruce Straley; Neil Druckmann
- Designer: Jacob Minkoff
- Programmers: Travis McIntosh; Jason Gregory
- Artists: Erick Pangilinan; Nate Wells
- Writer: Neil Druckmann
- Composer: Gustavo Santaolalla
- Series: The Last of Us
- Platforms: PlayStation 3; PlayStation 4
- Release: PlayStation 3: WW: June 14, 2013; PlayStation 4: NA: July 29, 2014; PAL: July 30, 2014; UK: August 1, 2014
- Genre: Action-adventure
- Modes: Single-player, multiplayer

The Last of Us is a 2013 action-adventure game developed by Naughty Dog and published by Sony Computer Entertainment. Players control Joel, a smuggler tasked with escorting a teenage girl, Ellie, across a post-apocalyptic United States. The Last of Us is played from a third-person perspective. Players use firearms, improvised weapons, and stealth to defend against hostile humans and cannibalistic creatures infected by a mutated fungus. In the online multiplayer mode, up to eight players engage in cooperative and competitive gameplay.

The game's development began in 2009 after the release of Naughty Dog's previous game, Uncharted 2: Among Thieves. The studio split into two teams for the first time, with one developing The Last of Us and the other Uncharted 3: Drake's Deception. Troy Baker and Ashley Johnson portrayed Joel and Ellie through voice and motion capture, and assisted creative director Neil Druckmann with developing the characters and story; Joel and Ellie's relationship became the focus of development, with all other elements crafted around it. The score was composed and performed by Gustavo Santaolalla.

The Last of Us was released for the PlayStation 3 in 2013 to critical acclaim for its narrative, gameplay, visuals, sound design, score, characterization, depiction of violence, and portrayal of female characters. It became one of the best-selling video games, selling over 1.3 million copies in its first week and 17 million by April 2018. Its year-end accolades include Game of the Year awards from several gaming publications and awards ceremonies. It is considered one of the most significant seventh-generation console games and among the best video games.

Naughty Dog released several downloadable content additions; The Last of Us: Left Behind adds a single-player campaign following Ellie and her best friend Riley. A remastered version, The Last of Us Remastered, was released for the PlayStation 4 in 2014, and a remake, The Last of Us Part I, was released for the PlayStation 5 in 2022 and on Windows in 2023. A sequel, The Last of Us Part II, was released in 2020. Other The Last of Us media includes a comic book in 2013, a live show in 2014, a television adaptation by HBO in 2023, and a tabletop game by Themeborne in 2024.

== Gameplay ==
The Last of Us is an action-adventure game played from a third-person perspective. The player traverses post-apocalyptic environments such as towns, buildings, forests, and sewers to advance the story. The player can use firearms, improvised weapons, hand-to-hand combat, and stealth to defend against hostile humans and cannibalistic creatures infected by a mutated strain of the Cordyceps fungus. For most of the game, the player takes control of Joel, a man tasked with escorting a young girl, Ellie, across the United States. The player also controls Ellie throughout the game's winter segment and briefly controls Joel's daughter, Sarah, in the opening sequence.

Listen Mode allows players to discover the position of enemies and characters by displaying their outline through walls, achieved through a heightened sense of hearing and spatial awareness.

In combat, the player can use long-range weapons, such as a rifle, a shotgun, and a bow, and short-range weapons such as a handgun and a short-barreled shotgun. The player is able to scavenge limited-use melee weapons, such as pipes and baseball bats, and throw bottles and bricks to distract, stun, or attack enemies. The player can upgrade weapons at workbenches using collected items. Equipment such as health kits, shivs, and Molotov cocktails can be found or crafted using collected items. Attributes such as the health meter and crafting speed can be upgraded by collecting pills and medicinal plants. Health can be recharged by finding edible items or through the use of health kits.

Though the player can attack enemies directly, they can also use stealth to attack undetected or sneak by them. "Listen Mode" allows the player to locate enemies through a heightened sense of hearing and spatial awareness, indicated as outlines visible through walls and objects. In the dynamic cover system, the player can crouch behind obstacles to gain a tactical advantage during combat. The game features periods without combat, often involving conversation between the characters. The player can solve simple puzzles, such as using floating pallets to move Ellie, who is unable to swim, across bodies of water and using ladders or dumpsters to reach higher areas. Story collectibles, such as notes, maps and comics, can be scavenged and viewed in the backpack menu.

The game features an artificial intelligence system by which hostile human enemies react to combat. If enemies discover the player, they may take cover or call for assistance and can take advantage of the player being distracted, out of ammunition, or in a fight. Player companions, such as Ellie, can assist in combat by throwing objects at threats to stun them, announcing the location of unseen enemies, or using a knife and pistol to attack enemies.

=== Multiplayer ===
The online multiplayer mode, called Factions, allows up to eight players to engage in competitive gameplay in rearranged versions of multiple single-player settings. The game features three multiplayer game types: Supply Raid and Survivors are both team deathmatches, with the latter excluding the ability to respawn; Interrogation features teams investigating the location of the enemy team's lockbox and the first to capture said lockbox wins. In every mode, players select a faction—Hunters (a group of hostile survivors) or Fireflies (a revolutionary militia group)—and keep their clan alive by collecting supplies during matches. Each match is equal to one day; by surviving twelve "weeks", players have completed a journey and can re-select their Faction.

Players earn "parts" by marking or killing enemies, healing or reviving allies, crafting items, and unlocking the enemy lockbox. Parts can be spent mid-match on weapon upgrades and armor and are converted to supplies at the end of the match; additional supplies can be scavenged from enemies' bodies. Players also earn points as they play, which can be spent on weapons or skills to create custom loadouts. Players could originally connect the game to their Facebook account, altering clan members' names and faces to match their Facebook friends. Players have the ability to customize their characters with hats, helmets, masks, and emblems. The multiplayer servers for the PlayStation 3 version of the game were shut down on September 3, 2019.

== Plot ==
In 2013, an outbreak of a mutant Cordyceps fungus spread through bites and airborne spores ravages the United States, transforming its human hosts into aggressive creatures. In the suburbs of Austin, Texas, Joel (Troy Baker) flees the chaos with his brother, Tommy (Jeffrey Pierce), and daughter, Sarah (Hana Hayes). As they flee, Sarah is shot by a soldier and dies in Joel's arms.

Twenty years later, civilization has been destroyed by the infection. Joel works as a smuggler with his partner, Tess (Annie Wersching), in a quarantine zone in Boston, Massachusetts. They hunt down Robert (Robin Atkin Downes), a black-market dealer, to recover a stolen weapons cache he traded with the Fireflies, a rebel militia opposing the Federal Disaster Response Agency (FEDRA), an organization which controls the quarantine zones. Its leader, Marlene (Merle Dandridge), promises to double their cache in return for smuggling a fourteen-year-old girl, Ellie (Ashley Johnson), to Fireflies hiding in the Massachusetts State House. Joel and Tess discover Ellie is infected; she claims she is immune and may be able to help develop a cure. At the State House, they discover the Fireflies have been killed and Tess reveals she has been infected during their journey. Believing in Ellie's importance, Tess sacrifices herself against pursuing soldiers so Joel and Ellie can escape. Joel decides to find Tommy, a former Firefly, in the hope he can locate others.

With the help of Bill (W. Earl Brown), a smuggler and survivalist in Lincoln, Massachusetts, Joel and Ellie acquire a working vehicle. Driving into Pittsburgh, Pennsylvania, Joel and Ellie are ambushed by bandits and their car is wrecked. They ally with two brothers, Henry (Brandon Scott) and Sam (Nadji Jeter). After they escape the city, Sam is bitten but hides it from the group. As his infection takes hold, Sam attacks Ellie, but Henry shoots him dead before taking his own life out of grief.

In the fall, Joel and Ellie find Tommy in Jackson, Wyoming, where he has assembled a fortified settlement near a hydroelectric dam with his wife, Maria (Ashley Scott). Joel unsuccessfully leaves Ellie with Tommy, ending in a confrontation about Sarah. Tommy directs them to a Firefly enclave at the University of Eastern Colorado. There, they discover the Fireflies have moved to a hospital in Salt Lake City, Utah. The two are attacked by bandits and Joel is severely wounded while escaping.

During the winter, Ellie and Joel shelter in the mountains. Joel is on the brink of death and relies on Ellie to care for him. Ellie encounters David (Nolan North) and James (Reuben Langdon), scavengers willing to trade medicine for food. After David reveals the university bandits were part of his group, Ellie becomes hostile. She leads David's group away from Joel but is captured; David intends to recruit her into his cannibal group. Ellie escapes after killing James, but David corners her in a burning restaurant. Joel recovers from his wounds and sets out to find Ellie. He reaches her just as she hacks David to death with a machete, an act that traumatizes her, and Joel comforts her before they flee.

In the spring, Joel and Ellie arrive in Salt Lake City. Ellie is rendered unconscious after almost drowning before a Firefly patrol captures them. In the hospital, Marlene tells Joel that Ellie is being prepared for surgery: in hopes of producing a vaccine for the infection, the Fireflies must remove the infected portion of Ellie's brain, which will kill her. Unwilling to let Ellie die, Joel battles his way to the operating room and kills the lead surgeon. Joel carries the unconscious Ellie to the parking garage, where he is confronted by Marlene, whom he shoots dead to prevent the Fireflies from pursuing them. On their way back to Tommy, when Ellie wakes up, Joel lies and tells her that the Fireflies had found other immune people but were unable to create a cure and have stopped trying. Ellie later expresses her survivor guilt. At her insistence, Joel swears his story about the Fireflies is true.

== Development ==
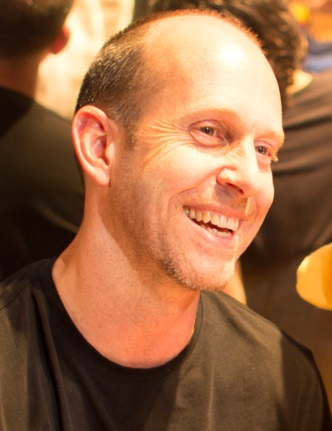
Bruce Straley

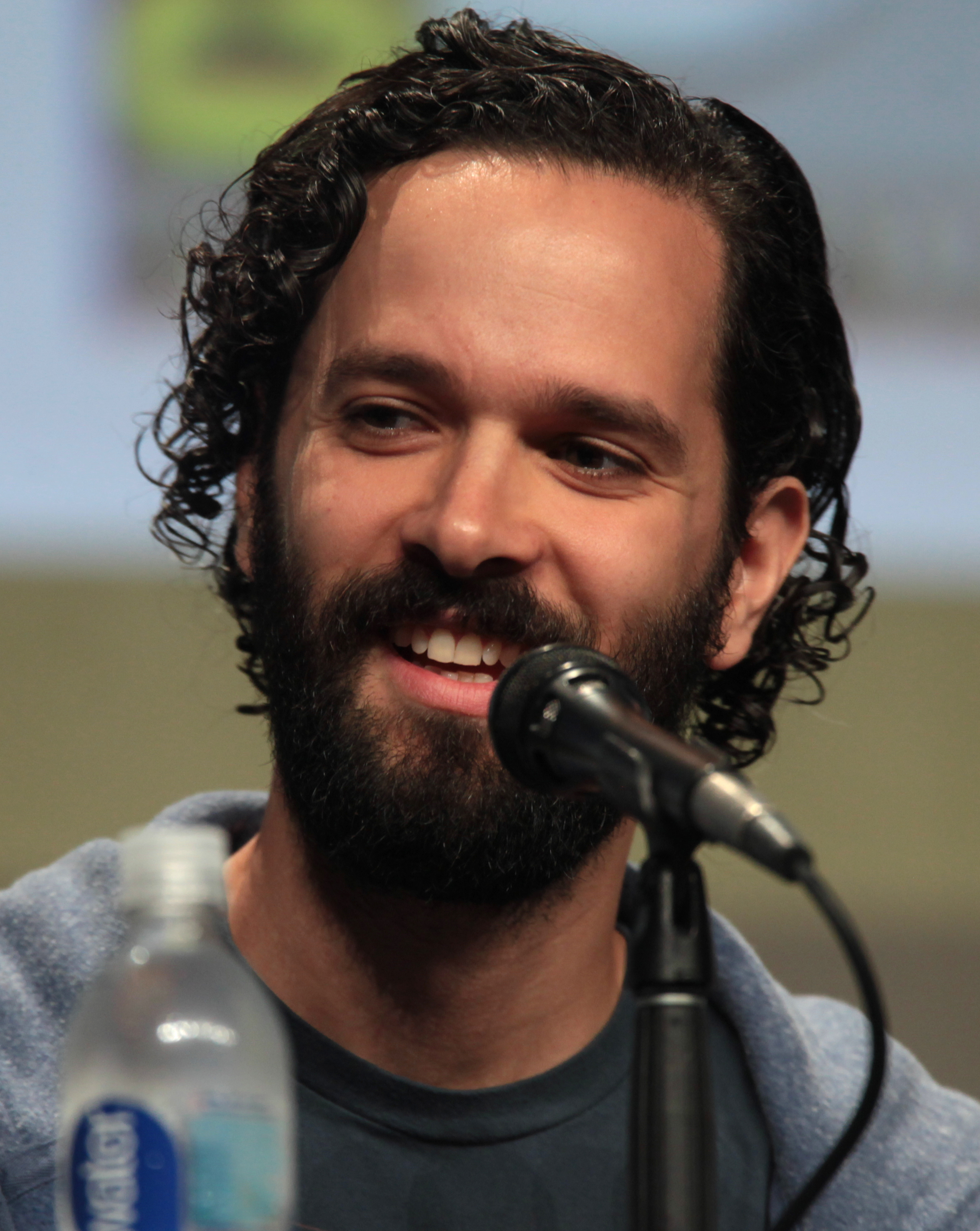
Neil Druckmann

Straley and Druckmann led development as game director and creative director, respectively.

Naughty Dog began developing The Last of Us in 2009, following the release of Uncharted 2: Among Thieves. For the first time in the company's history, Naughty Dog split into two teams; while one team developed Uncharted 3: Drake's Deception (2011), the other began work on The Last of Us. Game director Bruce Straley and creative director Neil Druckmann led the team responsible for developing The Last of Us.

While at university, Druckmann had an idea to merge the gameplay of Ico (2001) in a story set during a zombie apocalypse, like that of George A. Romero's Night of the Living Dead (1968), with a lead character similar to John Hartigan from Sin City (1991–2000). The lead character, a police officer, would be tasked with protecting a young girl; however, due to the lead character's heart condition, players would often assume control of the young girl, reversing the roles. Druckmann later developed it when creating the story of The Last of Us. Druckmann views The Last of Us as a coming-of-age story, in which Ellie adapts to survival after spending time with Joel, as well as an exploration of how willing a father is to save his child.

A major motif of the game is that "life goes on"; this is presented in a scene in which Joel and Ellie discover a herd of giraffes, which concept artist John Sweeney explained was designed to "reignite [Ellie's] lust for life" after her suffering following her encounter with David. The infected, a core concept of the game, were inspired by a segment of the BBC nature documentary Planet Earth (2006), which featured the Cordyceps fungi. Though the fungi mainly infect insects, taking control of their motor functions and forcing them to help cultivate the fungus, the game explores the concept of the fungus evolving and infecting humans, (Note: Biology scholars recognized the impossibility of the fungus infecting humans in real-life; Dr. Charissa de Bekker described it as "a very big leap".) as well as the direct results of an outbreak of this infection.

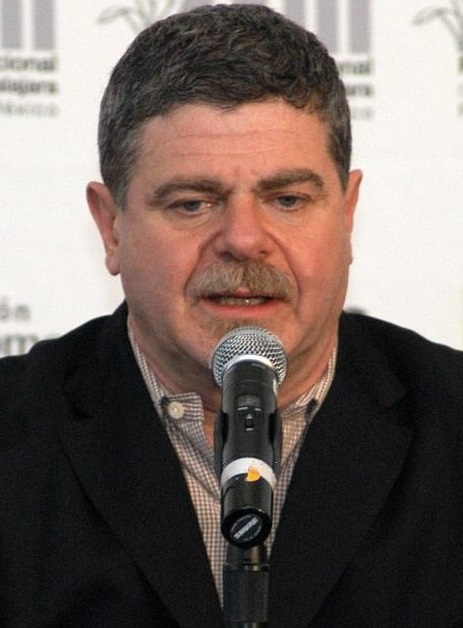
Argentine musician Gustavo Santaolalla composed and performed the score for The Last of Us.

The relationship between Joel and Ellie was the focus of the game; all other elements were developed around it. Troy Baker and Ashley Johnson were cast as Joel and Ellie and provided voice and motion capture performances. Baker and Johnson contributed to the development of the characters; for example, Baker convinced Druckmann that Joel would care for Tess due to his loneliness, and Johnson convinced Druckmann that Ellie should be stronger and more defensive. Following comparisons to actor Elliot Page, Ellie's appearance was redesigned to better reflect Johnson's personality and make her younger. The game's other characters also underwent changes. The character Tess was originally intended to be the main antagonist, but the team found it difficult to believe her motives. The sexuality of the character Bill was originally left vague in the script but later altered to further reflect his homosexuality.

The Last of Us features an original score composed primarily by Gustavo Santaolalla. Known for his minimalist compositions, Santaolalla was contacted early in development. He used various instruments to compose the score, including some that he was unfamiliar with, giving a sense of danger and innocence. This minimalist approach was also taken with the game's sound and art design. The sound of the infected was one of the first tasks during development; the team experimented with the sound in order to achieve the best work possible. To achieve the sound of the Clicker, they hired voice actress Misty Lee, who provided a sound that audio lead Phillip Kovats described as originating in the "back of the throat". The art department took various pieces of work as inspiration, such as Robert Polidori's photographs following Hurricane Katrina, which were used as a reference point when designing the flooded areas of Pittsburgh. The art department were forced to negotiate for things that they wished to include, due to the strong differing opinions of the team during development. Ultimately, the team settled on a balance between simplicity and detail; while Straley and Druckmann preferred the former, the art team preferred the latter. The game's opening credits were produced by Sony's San Diego Studio.

The Last of Us game designer Ricky Cambier cited the video games Ico and Resident Evil 4 as influences on the game design. He said the emotional weight of the relationship needed to be balanced with the tension of the world's issues, stating that they "wanted to take the character building and interaction" of Ico and "blend it with the tension and action of Resident Evil 4". The team created new engines to satisfy their needs for the game. The artificial intelligence was created to coordinate with players; the addition of Ellie as artificial intelligence was a major contributor to the engine. The lighting engine was also re-created to incorporate soft light, in which the sunlight seeps in through spaces and reflects off surfaces. The gameplay introduced difficulty to the team, as they felt that every mechanic required thorough analysis. The game's user interface design also underwent various iterations throughout development.

The Last of Us was announced on December 10, 2011, at the Spike Video Game Awards, alongside its debut trailer. The announcement ignited widespread anticipation within the gaming industry, which journalists ascribed to Naughty Dog's reputation. The game missed its original projected release date of May 7, 2013, and was pushed to June 14, 2013, worldwide for further polishing. To promote pre-order sales, Naughty Dog collaborated with several retailers to provide special editions of the game with extra content.

=== Additional content ===
Downloadable content (DLC) for the game was released following its launch. The game's season pass includes access to all DLC, some additional abilities, and the documentary Grounded: Making The Last of Us; the documentary was released online in February 2014. Two DLC packs were included with some of the game's special editions and were available upon release. The Sights and Sounds Pack included the soundtrack, a dynamic theme for the PlayStation 3 home screen, and two avatars. The Survival Pack featured bonus skins for the player following the completion of the campaign, and in-game money, as well as bonus experience points and early access to customizable items for the game's multiplayer. Abandoned Territories Map Pack, released on October 15, 2013, added four new multiplayer maps, based on locations in the game's story. Nightmare Bundle, released on November 5, 2013, added a collection of ten head items, nine of which are available to purchase separately.

The Last of Us: Left Behind adds a single-player campaign that features two storylines—one set after the prologue of The Last of Us and one before the Winter chapter—following Ellie and her friend Riley. It was released on February 14, 2014, as DLC and on May 12, 2015, as a standalone expansion pack. A third bundle was released on May 6, 2014, featuring five separate DLC: Grounded added a new difficulty to the main game and Left Behind; Reclaimed Territories Map Pack added new multiplayer maps; Professional Survival Skills Bundle and Situational Survival Skills Bundle added eight new multiplayer skills; and Survivalist Weapon Bundle added four new weapons. The Grit and Gear Bundle, which added new headgear items, masks and gestures, was released on August 5, 2014. A Game of the Year Edition containing all downloadable content was released in Europe on November 11, 2014.

=== Remaster and remake ===
On April 9, 2014, Sony Computer Entertainment announced The Last of Us Remastered, a remastered version of the game for the PlayStation 4. It was released in July and August 2014. (Note: The Last of Us Remastered was released on different dates, dependent on territory: July 29, 2014 in North America; July 30 in Europe, Australia, and New Zealand; and August 1 in the United Kingdom and Ireland.) Remastered uses the DualShock 4's touchpad to navigate inventory items, and the light bar signals health, scaling from green to orange and red when taking damage. In addition, audio recordings found in the game world can be heard through the controller's speaker; the original version forced players to remain in a menu while the recordings were played. The game's Photo Mode allows players to capture images of the game by pausing gameplay and adjusting the camera freely. In the menu, players have the ability to watch all cutscenes with audio commentary featuring Druckmann, Baker, and Johnson. Remastered features improved graphics and rendering upgrades, including increased draw distance, a higher frame rate, and advanced audio options. It includes the previously released downloadable content, including Left Behind and some multiplayer maps. The development team aimed to create a "true" remaster, maintaining the "core experience".

The Last of Us Part I, a remake of The Last of Us, was released for PlayStation 5 on September 2, 2022, and for Windows on March 28, 2023. It features revised gameplay and controls, improved performance and lighting effects, and new accessibility options. On PlayStation 5, the game supports 3D audio, as well as the haptic feedback and adaptive triggers of the DualSense controller. Development of The Last of Us Part I was led by game director Matthew Gallant and creative director Shaun Escayg. The game was completely rebuilt to take advantage of the updated PlayStation 5 hardware, requiring new art direction, animation, and character models. The technological and graphical enhancements were intended to align with the vision of the original game's development team. Escayg wanted each element to make the player feel grounded and immersed in the game world. Gallant collaborated with a specialized team at Descriptive Video Works to create audio descriptions for cutscenes. Reactions to the remake's announcement were mixed, with some journalists and players considering it unnecessary due to the age of the original and the existence of Remastered, as well as questioning its US$70 price point. Upon release, the game received positive reviews, though response to the Windows version was mixed, becoming Naughty Dog's lowest-rated game.

== Reception ==
=== Critical response ===
Reception

Aggregate score
Aggregator	Score
Metacritic	95/100

Review scores
Publication	Score
Computer and Video Games	10/10
Edge	10/10
Electronic Gaming Monthly	9.5/10
Eurogamer	10/10
Game Informer	9.5/10
GameSpot	8/10
IGN	10/10
Joystiq	5/5
PlayStation Official Magazine – UK	10/10
Polygon	7.5/10

The Last of Us received "universal acclaim", according to review aggregator Metacritic. It is the fifth-highest-rated PlayStation 3 game on Metacritic. Reviewers praised the character development, story and subtext, visual and sound design, and depiction of female and LGBT characters. Colin Moriarty of IGN called The Last of Us "a masterpiece" and "PlayStation 3's best exclusive", and Edge considered it "the most riveting, emotionally resonant story-driven epic" of the console generation. Oli Welsh of Eurogamer wrote that it is "a beacon of hope" for the survival horror genre; Andy Kelly of Computer and Video Games (CVG) declared it "Naughty Dog's finest moment".

Kelly of CVG found the story memorable, and IGN's Moriarty named it one of the game's standout features. PlayStation Official Magazine's (OPM) David Meikleham wrote that the pacing contributed to the improvement of the story, stating that there is "a real sense of time elapsed and journey traveled along every step of the way", and Destructoid's James Stephanie Sterling lauded the game's suspenseful moments. Richard Mitchell of Joystiq found that the narrative improved the character relationships, and Tom Hoggins of The Telegraph commended the consonance of the story and the action.

The characters—particularly the relationship between Joel and Ellie—received acclaim. Matt Helgeson of Game Informer wrote that the relationship felt identifiable, naming it "poignant" and "well drawn". Eurogamer's Welsh wrote that the characters were developed with "real patience and skill", appreciating their emotional value, and Joystiq's Mitchell found the relationship "genuine" and emotional. Eric L. Patterson of Electronic Gaming Monthly (EGM) wrote that the characters' journeys were "more important and interesting" than anything else in the game. OPM's Meikleham named Joel and Ellie the best characters of any PlayStation 3 game, while IGN's Moriarty identified them as a highlight of the game. Kelly of CVG named the characters "richly painted", feeling invested in their stories. Philip Kollar of Polygon felt that Ellie was believable, making it easier to develop a connection to her, and that the relationship between the characters was assisted by the game's optional conversations. OPM's Meikleham found Ellie's idle animations interacting with the environment made her a convincing teenager. The performances also received praise, with Edge and Eurogamer's Welsh noting that the script improved as a result.

Many reviewers found the game's combat a refreshing difference from other games. Game Informer's Helgeson and OPM's Meikleham appreciated the vulnerability during fights, while Kelly of CVG enjoyed the variety in approaching the combat. Paul Sartori of The Guardian found the combat system largely derivative from Uncharted and that its roughness translated well to the grittiness of The Last of Us. IGN's Moriarty felt that the crafting system assisted the combat and that the latter contributed to the narrative's emotional value, adding that enemies feel "human". Joystiq's Mitchell reiterated similar comments, stating that the combat "piles death upon death on Joel's hands". Welsh of Eurogamer found the suspenseful and threatening encounters added positively to the gameplay. Some reviewers felt the artificial intelligence negatively affected the combat, with enemies often ignoring players' companions. Polygon's Kollar also felt that the combat was unfair, especially when fighting the infected, and noted some inconsistencies in the game's artificial intelligence that "shatters the atmosphere" of the characters.

An artistic design of a location in the post-apocalyptic United States. Reviewers praised the design and layouts of the locations. The game's visual features, both artistic and graphic, were also well received.

The game's visual features were commended by many reviewers. The art design was lauded as "outstanding" by CVG's Kelly, and "jaw-dropping" by Eurogamer's Welsh. In contrast, Tom Mc Shea of GameSpot identified the visual representation of the post-apocalyptic world was "mundane", having been portrayed various times previously. The game's graphics have been frequently named by critics as the best for a PlayStation 3 game, with Helgeson of Game Informer naming them "unmatched in console gaming", and Moriarty of IGN stating that they contribute to the realism. The Guardian's Sartori wrote highly of the variation and rendering of game environment, and praised the detail and animation of the character models. Destructoid's Sterling wrote that the game was visually impressive but that technical issues, such as some "muddy and basic" textures found early in the game, left a negative impact on the visuals.

The worldbuilding of the game drew acclaim from many reviewers. Kelly of CVG stated that the environments are "large, detailed, and littered with secrets", adding that The Last of Us "masks" its linearity successfully. Edge likewise wrote that the level design serves the story appropriately, while EGM's Patterson felt the locations were "brimming with interest and personality" and praised the small details in the environment. Helgeson of Game Informer wrote that the world "effectively and gorgeously [conveys] the loneliness" of the story. IGN's Moriarty appreciated the added design elements placed around the game world, such as the hidden notes and letters. The plausibility of the infection was commended by Scientific American's Kyle Hill. In the narrative context, The Guardian's Sartori found the story of the infection to be a trope, yet praised the game for not attempting to expound upon it in detail and rather focus on characterization.

Reviewers praised the use of sound in The Last of Us. Eurogamer's Welsh felt that the sound design was significantly better than in other games, and that the music was "sparse, elegant and sad", while Game Informer's Helgeson dubbed the sound design "amazing" and the music "understated and haunting". Mc Shea of GameSpot stated that the audio added to the effect of the gameplay, particularly when hiding from enemies, and felt the music complemented emotional moments. Kelly of CVG found that the environmental audio positively impacted gameplay and that Gustavo Santaolalla's score was "sparse and delicate". Destructoid's Sterling also called the score "haunting" and similarly found that it complements the gameplay; Edge found the music contributed to the game's "earthiness" while fitting in with Joel and Ellie's calm moments.

The graphic depiction of violence in The Last of Us generated substantial commentary from critics. Prior to the release of the game, Keith Stuart of The Guardian wrote that the acceptability of the violence would depend on its context within the game. Engadget writer Ben Gilbert found the game's persistent focus on combat was "a necessary evil to lead the game's fragile protagonist duo to safety", as opposed to being used as a method to achieve objectives. Kotaku's Kirk Hamilton wrote that the violence was "heavy, consequential and necessary", as opposed to gratuitous. USgamer's Anthony John Agnello wrote that the game consistently reinforces the negativity associated with violence, intentionally making players feel uncomfortable while in violent combat. He stated that the deaths within the game were not unnecessary or unjustified, making the story more powerful. Kelly of CVG stated that, despite the "incredibly brutal" combat, the violence never felt gratuitous. OPM's Meikleham echoed remarks that the violence was not gratuitous, instead serving to "convincingly sell" the game's atmosphere. Eurogamer's Welsh echoed similar remarks, stating that the violence is not "desensitized or mindless". Matt Helgeson of Game Informer observed that the game's violence leads to players questioning the morality of their choices. Joystiq's Mitchell wrote that the violence is "designed to be uncomfortable", stating that it contributes to Joel's character.

Many critics discussed the game's depiction of female characters. Jason Killingsworth of Edge praised its lack of sexualized female characters, writing that it "offers a refreshing antidote to the sexism and regressive gender attitudes of most blockbuster videogames". Eurogamer's Ellie Gibson praised Ellie as "sometimes strong, sometimes vulnerable, but never a cliché". She felt that Ellie is initially established as a "damsel in distress", but that this concept is subverted. GameSpot's Carolyn Petit praised the female characters as morally conflicted and sympathetic, but wrote that gender in video games should be evaluated "based on their actual merits, not in relation to other games". Chris Suellentrop of The New York Times acknowledged that Ellie is a likable and "sometimes powerful" character, but argued that The Last of Us is "actually the story of Joel", stating that it is "another video game by men, for men and about men". The Last of Us was also praised for its depiction of LGBT characters. Sam Einhorn of GayGamer.net felt that the revelation of Bill's sexuality "added to his character ... without really tokenizing him". American organization GLAAD named Bill one of the "most intriguing new LGBT characters of 2013", calling him "deeply flawed but wholly unique". A kiss between two female characters in Left Behind was met with positive reactions.

Remastered reception

Aggregate score
Aggregator	Score
Metacritic	95/100

Review scores
Publication	Score
Electronic Gaming Monthly	9.5/10
Game Informer	10/10
IGN	10/10
Polygon	8/10
The Telegraph	9/10
VideoGamer.com	10/10
The Escapist	4.5/5

The Last of Us Remastered received "universal acclaim" according to Metacritic. It is the third-highest-rated PlayStation 4 game on Metacritic, tied with Persona 5 Royal and behind Grand Theft Auto V and Red Dead Redemption 2. Critics praised the improved graphics, technical enhancements, controls adjustments, the inclusion of Left Behind, and the addition of Photo Mode and audio commentary. Polygon's Kollar compared it to a director's cut home media release, and The Escapist's Sterling called it "the definitive version of the game". The Telegraph's Hoggins considered the enhancements minimal but understandable, considering the original game's high quality.

=== Accolades ===
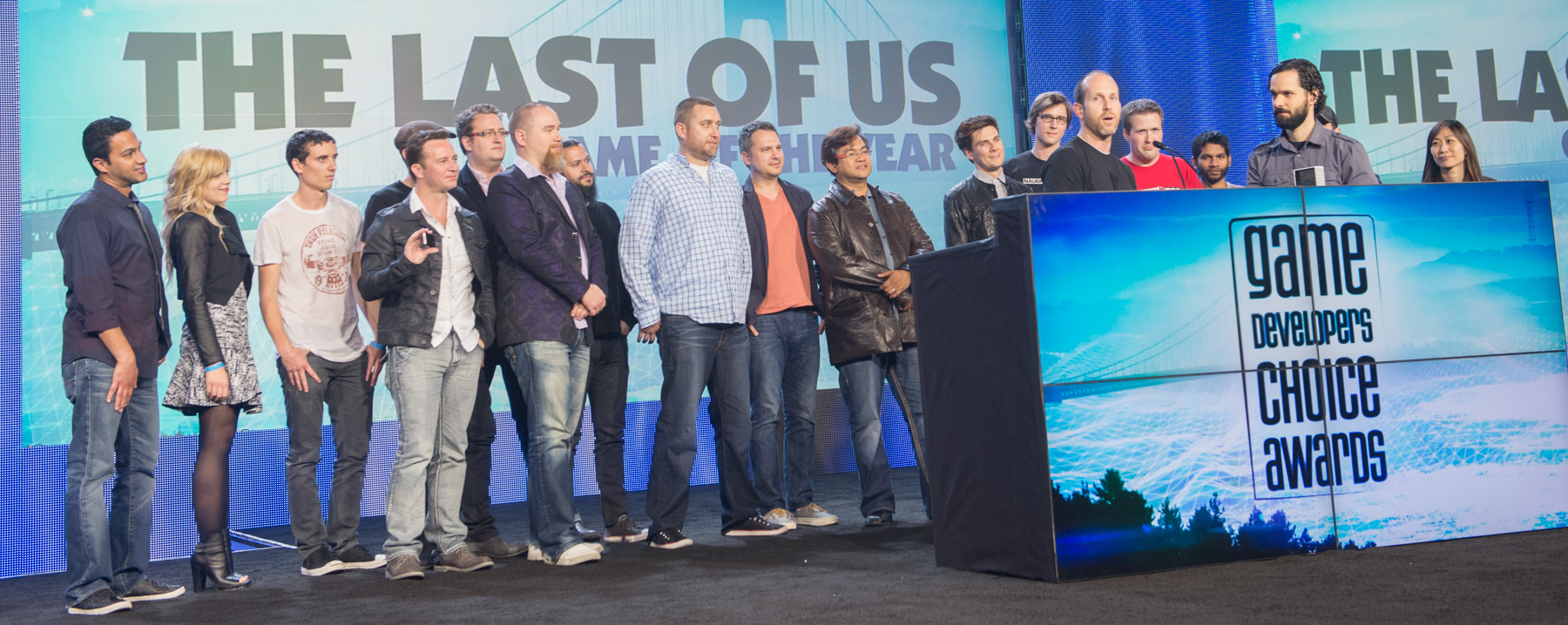
The Last of Us won Game of the Year at the Game Developers Choice Awards.

The Last of Us appeared on several year-end lists of the best games of 2013, (Note: The Last of Us appeared on year-end lists from outlets such as: The A.V. Club, Canada.com, The Telegraph, Destructoid, The Escapist, GamesRadar, GameTrailers, GameRevolution, Giant Bomb, Good Game, Hardcore Gamer, IGN, IGN Australia, International Business Times, Kotaku, VG247, and VideoGamer.com.) receiving wins at the 41st Annie Awards, 10th British Academy Video Games Awards, 17th Annual D.I.C.E. Awards, and 14th Annual Game Developers Choice Awards. Several publications named it the year's best PlayStation game, and Naughty Dog the best developer. Johnson's performance received accolades at the British Academy Video Games Awards, D.I.C.E. Awards, and VGX 2013; the lattermost also awarded Baker for his role. Several awards were also presented for the game's narrative, (Note: The narrative received awards at the British Academy Video Games Awards, the D.I.C.E. Awards, the Game Developers Choice Awards, the Golden Joystick Awards, and the Writers Guild of America Awards, and from GameTrailers, Giant Bomb, Hardcore Gamer, and IGN.) sound design and music, (Note: The sound design and music received awards at the D.I.C.E. Awards, the Inside Gaming Awards, and from IGN.) graphics and art design, (Note: The graphics and artistic design won awards at the D.I.C.E. Awards, the Golden Joystick Awards, and from Destructoid and IGN.) and gameplay, (Note: The Last of Us won Outstanding Innovation in Gaming at the D.I.C.E. Awards and Best Third Person Shooter from GameTrailers.) and it received awards for its genre (Note: The Last of Us won Best Action-Adventure Game at the British Academy Video Games Awards and from The Escapist and IGN, Best Action Game from Hardcore Gamer, and Adventure Game of the Year at the D.I.C.E. Awards.) and for being an original game. (Note: The Last of Us won Best New IP from Hardcore Gamer, Best Newcomer at the Golden Joystick Awards, and Best Debut from Giant Bomb.)

== Sales ==
Within seven days of its release, The Last of Us sold over 1.3 million copies, becoming the biggest video game launch of 2013 at the time. Three weeks after its release, the game sold over 3.4 million copies and was deemed the biggest launch of an original game since 2011's L.A. Noire and the fastest-selling PlayStation 3 game of 2013 at the time. The game became the best-selling digital release on the PlayStation Store for PlayStation 3; this record was later beaten by Grand Theft Auto V. The Last of Us ultimately became the tenth-best-selling game of 2013, and sold six million copies in its first year. In the United Kingdom, the game remained atop the charts for six consecutive weeks, matching records set by multi-platform games. (Note: Other games that remained atop the UK charts for six consecutive weeks include FIFA 12 (2011) and Call of Duty: Black Ops II (2012).) Within 48 hours of its release, The Last of Us generated more than the £3 million earned by Man of Steel in the same period. The game also topped the charts in the United States, France, Ireland, Italy, the Netherlands, Sweden, Finland, Norway, Denmark, Spain, and Japan.

The Last of Us is one of the best-selling PlayStation 3 games and Remastered is among the best-selling PlayStation 4 games. By August 2014, the game had sold eight million copies: seven million on PlayStation 3 and one million on PlayStation 4. The game sold 17 million copies across both consoles by April 2018, and more than 20 million by May 2019: 8.4 million on PlayStation 3 and 11.79 million on PlayStation 4.

== Legacy ==
Critics concurred that The Last of Us was among the best seventh-generation console games and a great closing game before the eighth generation. It is often named one of the greatest video games. Several critics recognized it as a landmark for the industry, citing its blending of a nuanced narrative and effective gameplay; the developers of Resident Evil 7: Biohazard (2017), God of War (2018), and A Plague Tale: Innocence (2019) named it an inspiration for its focus on narrative and characters. A fan of the game, Grant Voegtle, published a cinematic trailer in 2014 and a series of playthroughs in 2015 in the style of a television series on YouTube, wanting non-gamers to experience its story; Naughty Dog and Druckmann praised his work, and Voegtle was soon hired at Naughty Dog and worked as a video editor.

The Last of Us was named among the best games of the 2010s by The Hollywood Reporter, Mashable, Metacritic, and VG247. It was added to the World Video Game Hall of Fame at the Strong National Museum of Play in May 2023. The following month, The Last Hope: Dead Zone Survival, released by Virtual Global Games for Nintendo Switch, was labeled a "clone" and "rip-off" of The Last of Us by journalists due to its similar concept, characters, and music; its trailers were removed from YouTube after a copyright claim from Sony and the game was removed from the Nintendo eShop in August.

=== Franchise ===
The Last of Us created a media franchise. A four-issue comic book miniseries, The Last of Us: American Dreams, was published by Dark Horse Comics from April to July 2013, written by Druckmann and illustrated by Faith Erin Hicks. The game's cast performed a live reading of selected scenes in Santa Monica, California, in July 2014, with live music by Santaolalla. A sequel to the game, The Last of Us Part II, was released for PlayStation 4 in June 2020. A tabletop game, Themeborne's The Last of Us: Escape the Dark, was released in 2024. Another, CMON's The Last of Us: The Board Game, was announced in 2020.

A Last of Us feature film written by Druckmann and produced by Sam Raimi entered development hell, and an animated short film adaptation by Oddfellows was canceled by Sony. Druckmann and Craig Mazin created a television adaptation starring Pedro Pascal and Bella Ramsey, which debuted on HBO and HBO Max in January 2023.
