= List of best-selling PlayStation 3 video games =

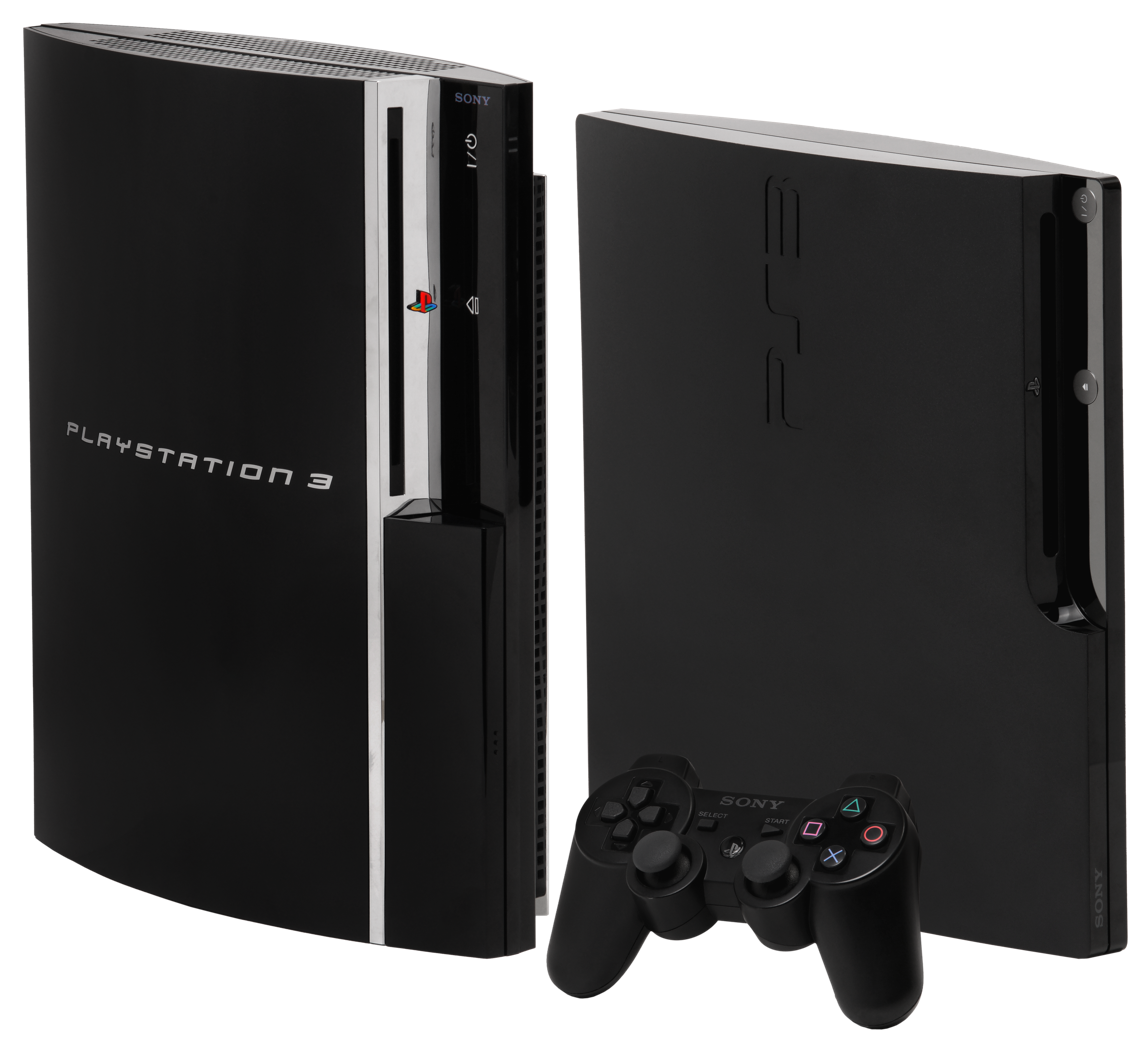
Original PlayStation 3 and PlayStation 3 Slim with DualShock 3 controller

This is a list of video games for the PlayStation 3 video game console that have sold or shipped at least one million copies.

As of May 12, 2025, a total of over one billion copies of PlayStation 3 software had been sold worldwide.

== List ==
Game	Copies sold	Release date (Note: Only the initial release date on this platform is listed.)	Genre(s)	Developer(s)	Publisher(s)
Grand Theft Auto V	29.52 million (Note: Of the 90 million total units sold by April 2018, 32.8% of that total were for the PlayStation 3 version.)	September 17, 2013	Action-adventure	Rockstar North	Rockstar Games
Gran Turismo 5	11.95 million	November 24, 2010	Sim racing	Polyphony Digital	Sony Computer Entertainment
Grand Theft Auto IV	11 million (Note: "GTA IV sold 13 million copies in its first year, approximately one third of them on PS3") (Note: Grand Theft Auto IV sales breakdown: Japan – 211,240 (original) and 37,306 (The Best); United Kingdom – 1 million; United States – 1.89 million)	April 29, 2008	Action-adventure	Rockstar North	Rockstar Games
The Last of Us	10 million	June 14, 2013	Action-adventure; survival horror	Naughty Dog	Sony Computer Entertainment
Uncharted 3: Drake's Deception	9 million	November 1, 2011	Action-adventure; third-person shooter	Naughty Dog	Sony Computer Entertainment
Uncharted 2: Among Thieves	7.3 million	October 13, 2009	Action-adventure; third-person shooter	Naughty Dog	Sony Computer Entertainment
Metal Gear Solid 4: Guns of the Patriots	7 million	June 12, 2008	Action-adventure; stealth	Kojima Productions	Konami
Batman: Arkham City	5.48 million	October 18, 2011	Action-adventure	Rocksteady Studios	Warner Bros. Games
Gran Turismo 5 Prologue	5.35 million	December 13, 2007	Sim racing	Polyphony Digital	Sony Computer Entertainment
Gran Turismo 6	5.22 million	December 6, 2013	Sim racing	Polyphony Digital	Sony Computer Entertainment
God of War III	5.18 million (Note: God of War III sales breakdown: Asia – 417,866; Latin and North America – 2,818,033; PAL regions – 1,961,733)	March 16, 2010	Action-adventure; hack and slash	Santa Monica Studio	Sony Computer Entertainment
Resident Evil 5	5.1 million	November 27, 2014	Survival horror	Capcom Production Studio 4	Capcom
Final Fantasy XIII	5 million (Note: Final Fantasy XIII sales breakdown: Japan – 1.904 million; Other Asian countries – 140,000; United Kingdom – 100,000; United States – 828,200)	December 17, 2009	Role-playing	Square Enix 1st Production Department	Square Enix
Uncharted: Drake's Fortune	4.8 million	November 16, 2007	Action-adventure; third-person shooter	Naughty Dog	Sony Computer Entertainment
Call of Duty: Modern Warfare 2	4.79 million (Note: Call of Duty: Modern Warfare 2 sales breakdown: Japan – 244,578 (original) and 25,268 (The Best); United Kingdom – at least 1 million; United States – 3.531 million)	November 10, 2009	First-person shooter	Infinity Ward	Activision
Batman: Arkham Asylum	4.23 million	August 25, 2009	Action-adventure	Rocksteady Studios	Warner Bros. Games; Eidos Interactive
LittleBigPlanet	4 million	October 27, 2008	Puzzle-platformer; sandbox	Media Molecule	Sony Computer Entertainment
MotorStorm	3.31 million	December 14, 2006	Racing	Evolution Studios	Sony Computer Entertainment
Call of Duty: Black Ops	3.269 million (Note: Call of Duty: Black Ops sales breakdown: Japan – 175,813; United States – 3.094 million)	November 9, 2010	First-person shooter	Treyarch	Activision
Heavy Rain	3.03 million	February 23, 2010	Interactive drama; action-adventure	Quantic Dream	Sony Computer Entertainment
God of War: Ascension	3 million	March 12, 2013	Action-adventure; hack and slash	Santa Monica Studio	Sony Computer Entertainment
Resistance 2	3 million	November 4, 2008	First-person shooter	Insomniac Games	Sony Computer Entertainment
Beyond: Two Souls	2.8 million	October 8, 2013	Interactive drama; action-adventure	Quantic Dream	Sony Computer Entertainment
Resistance: Fall of Man	2.5 million	November 14, 2006	First-person shooter	Insomniac Games	Sony Computer Entertainment
God of War Collection	2.39 million (Note: God of War Collection sales breakdown: Asia – 155,600; Latin and North America – 1,748,663; PAL regions – 514,253)	November 17, 2009	Action-adventure; hack and slash	Santa Monica Studio; Bluepoint Games	WW: Sony Computer Entertainment; JP: Capcom
Batman: Arkham Origins	2.29 million	October 25, 2013	Action-adventure	WB Games Montréal; Splash Damage	Warner Bros. Games
Lego Star Wars: The Complete Saga	2.16 million	November 6, 2007	Action-adventure	Traveller's Tales	LucasArts
inFAMOUS	2 million	May 26, 2009	Action-adventure	Sucker Punch Productions	Sony Computer Entertainment
Killzone 2	2 million	February 26, 2009	First-person shooter	Guerrilla Games	Sony Computer Entertainment
Mortal Kombat vs. DC Universe	2 million	November 16, 2008	Fighting	Midway Games	Midway Games
Dark Souls	1.9 million	September 22, 2011	Action role-playing	FromSoftware	WW: Namco Bandai Games; JP: FromSoftware
Call of Duty 4: Modern Warfare	1.86 million (Note: Call of Duty 4: Modern Warfare sales breakdown: Japan – 122,019 (regular) and 149,028 (The Best); United Kingdom – 600,000; United States – 1.106 million)	November 5, 2007	First-person shooter	Infinity Ward	Activision
Call of Duty: World at War	1.83 million (Note: Call of Duty: World at War sales breakdown: United Kingdom – 600,000; United States – 1.238 million)	November 11, 2008	First-person shooter	Treyarch	Activision
Demon's Souls	1.7 million	February 5, 2009	Action role-playing	FromSoftware	JP: Sony Computer Entertainment; NA: Atlus USA; PAL: Namco Bandai Games
L.A. Noire	1.68 million (Note: Of the total 4 million copies sold overall in its first month, 42% were the PS3 version)	May 17, 2011	Action-adventure	Team Bondi	Rockstar Games
Resident Evil 5	1.61 million (Note: Resident Evil 5 sales breakdown: France – 62,040; Japan – 520,564 (original) and 258,961 (Gold Edition); United Kingdom – 200,000; United States – 585,000)	March 5, 2009	Third-person shooter	Capcom	Capcom
Heavenly Sword	1.5 million	September 12, 2007	Action-adventure; hack and slash	Ninja Theory	Sony Computer Entertainment
Minecraft: PlayStation 3 Edition	1.5 million	December 17, 2013	Sandbox; survival	4J Studios	Sony Computer Entertainment
Metal Gear Rising: Revengeance	1.42 million	February 19, 2013	Action-adventure; Hack and slash	PlatinumGames	Konami
Pro Evolution Soccer 2008	1.42 million	October 26, 2007	Sports	Konami	Konami
Red Dead Redemption	1.34 million (Note: Red Dead Redemption sales breakdown: Japan – 109,340; United Kingdom – 300,000; United States – 947,400)	May 18, 2010	Action-adventure	Rockstar San Diego	Rockstar Games
Ratchet & Clank Future: Tools of Destruction	1.25 million	October 23, 2007	Platform; action-adventure	Insomniac Games	Sony Computer Entertainment
One Piece: Pirate Warriors	1.2 million	March 1, 2012	Action	Omega Force	Namco Bandai Games
Dark Souls II	1.1 million	March 11, 2014	Action role-playing	FromSoftware	WW: Bandai Namco Games; JP: FromSoftware
Ni no Kuni: Wrath of the White Witch	1.1 million	November 17, 2011	Role-playing	Level-5	WW: Namco Bandai Games; JP: Level-5
FIFA 11	1 million	September 28, 2010	Sports	Electronic Arts	Electronic Arts
FIFA 12	1 million	September 27, 2011	Sports	Electronic Arts	Electronic Arts
FIFA 13	1 million	September 25, 2012	Sports	Electronic Arts	Electronic Arts
MotorStorm: Pacific Rift	1 million	October 28, 2008	Racing	Evolution Studios	Sony Computer Entertainment
Valkyria Chronicles	1 million	April 24, 2008	Role-playing	Sega	Sega

== See also ==
- List of PlayStation 3 games (A–C)
- List of PlayStation 3 games (D–I)
- List of PlayStation 3 games (J–P)
- List of PlayStation 3 games (Q–Z)
