= The Last of Us Part I =

2022 video game

- Cover art design by David Blatt
- Developer: Naughty Dog (Note: Iron Galaxy assisted with development of the Windows version.)
- Publisher: Sony Interactive Entertainment
- Directors: Matthew Gallant (Note: Bruce Straley was the game director of the original game.); Shaun Escayg (Note: Neil Druckmann was the creative director of the original game.)
- Producer: Waylon Brinck
- Designer: Christian Wohlwend (Note: Jacob Minkoff was the lead designer of the original game. For Part I, Christian Wohlwend was listed in the credits as principal game designer alongside two others, but elsewhere as lead designer.)
- Programmer: Travis McIntosh (Note: Travis McIntosh was programming director, an extension of his role as co-lead programmer on the original game alongside Jason Gregory, who returned as co-lead programmer alongside four others for Part I.)
- Artists: Erick Pangilinan; Sebastian Gromann (Note: Erick Pangilinan was an art director on the original game, alongside Nate Wells.)
- Writer: Neil Druckmann
- Composer: Gustavo Santaolalla
- Series: The Last of Us
- Platforms: PlayStation 5; Windows
- Release: PlayStation 5; September 2, 2022; Windows; March 28, 2023
- Genre: Action-adventure
- Mode: Single-player

The Last of Us Part I is a 2022 action-adventure game developed by Naughty Dog and published by Sony Interactive Entertainment. A remake of the 2013 game The Last of Us, it features revised gameplay, including enhanced combat and exploration, and expanded accessibility options. Players control Joel, who is tasked with escorting the young Ellie across a post-apocalyptic United States and defend her against cannibalistic creatures infected by a mutated strain of the Cordyceps fungus. The game includes a remake of the 2014 expansion pack, The Last of Us: Left Behind, which follows Ellie and her best friend Riley.

Development was led by game director Matthew Gallant and creative director Shaun Escayg, who replaced original directors Bruce Straley and Neil Druckmann. Part I was rebuilt for the updated hardware, requiring new animations, art direction, and character models to align with the original development team's vision. The cutscenes and narrative beats were analyzed to identify crucial storylines and their original direction and purpose. The team built upon the game engine of The Last of Us Part II (2020) by expanding the gameplay, technology, and accessibility features. Part I features audio descriptions, supports 3D audio, and uses the DualSense controller's haptic feedback and adaptive triggers.

The Last of Us Part I was released for the PlayStation 5 in September 2022. It received positive reviews from critics, who praised its graphical enhancements, facial animations, artificial intelligence, and its added accessibility, audio, and controller options. The response to its gameplay and level design was mixed, and several critics questioned the necessity of a remake, especially considering its price. It received an award at the Visual Effects Society Awards, and nominations at the Game Awards and Golden Joystick Awards. The Windows release in March 2023 was marred by performance problems and received mixed reviews. The game sold over two million units by March 2024.

== Gameplay ==
The Last of Us Part I (right) is a remake of The Last of Us (left), featuring revised gameplay, updated character models, and improved lighting effects.

The Last of Us Part I is a remake of the 2013 video game The Last of Us, an action-adventure game played from a third-person perspective. The player traverses post-apocalyptic environments to advance the story, and uses firearms, improvised weapons, hand-to-hand combat, and stealth to defend against hostile humans and cannibalistic creatures known as the Infected, who have been infected by a mutated strain of the Cordyceps fungus.

For most of the game, player character Joel escorts a young girl, Ellie, across the United States. The player controls Ellie throughout the winter and epilogue segments, and briefly controls Joel's daughter Sarah in the opening sequence. In the included expansion The Last of Us: Left Behind, the player controls Ellie as she spends time with her best friend and love interest Riley Abel. The original game's online multiplayer mode is omitted from Part I, and its narrative is entirely unchanged.

The remake features revised gameplay, including enhanced combat and exploration. The overhauled artificial intelligence (AI) allows more non-player characters (NPCs) on screen, with enemy AI acting more aggressive and tactical than in the original game. The Infected received gameplay adaptations, such as new Stalker animations and a charge move for Bloaters. Gameplay additions include a permadeath mode, a speedrun-focused mode, and new costumes for Joel and Ellie. The expanded accessibility options include customizable controls, a screen reader, audio prompts, audio description for cutscenes, and haptic feedback during dialogue; difficulty modes can be customized to change enemy resilience, stealth efficacy, and resource availability. The overhauled photo mode adds several features, allowing visual and gameplay modifiers such as slow motion and infinite ammunition.

On PlayStation 5, the game supports hardware features such as 3D audio, and uses the haptic feedback and adaptive triggers of the DualSense controller to emulate gameplay actions such as shooting a shotgun or drawing a bowstring. It can display at native 4K resolution at 30 frames per second, or upscaled resolution at a targeted 60 frames per second; with variable refresh rate enabled, both modes allow an unlocked frame rate, capable of more than 60 frames per second.

== Development ==
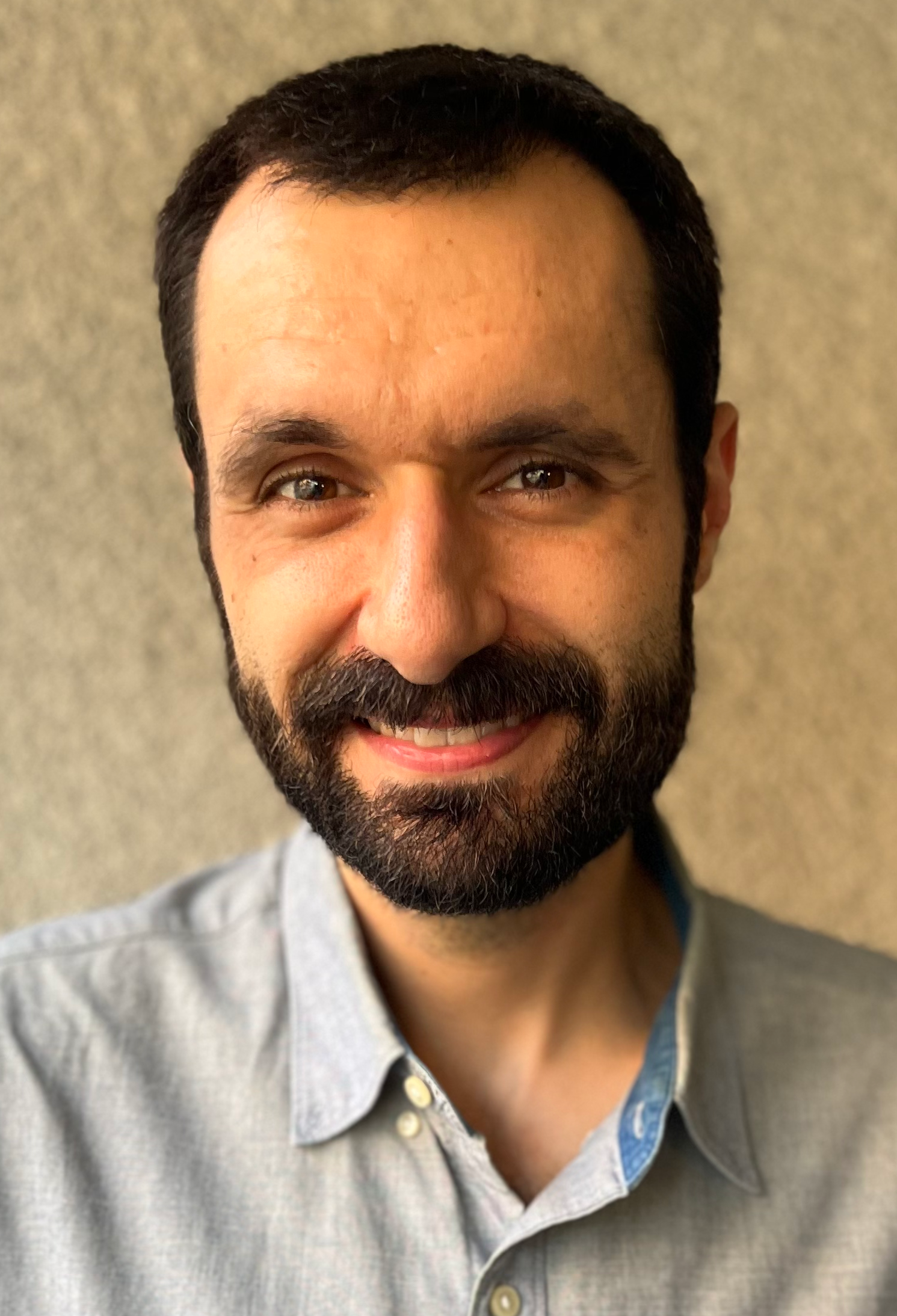
Matthew Gallant

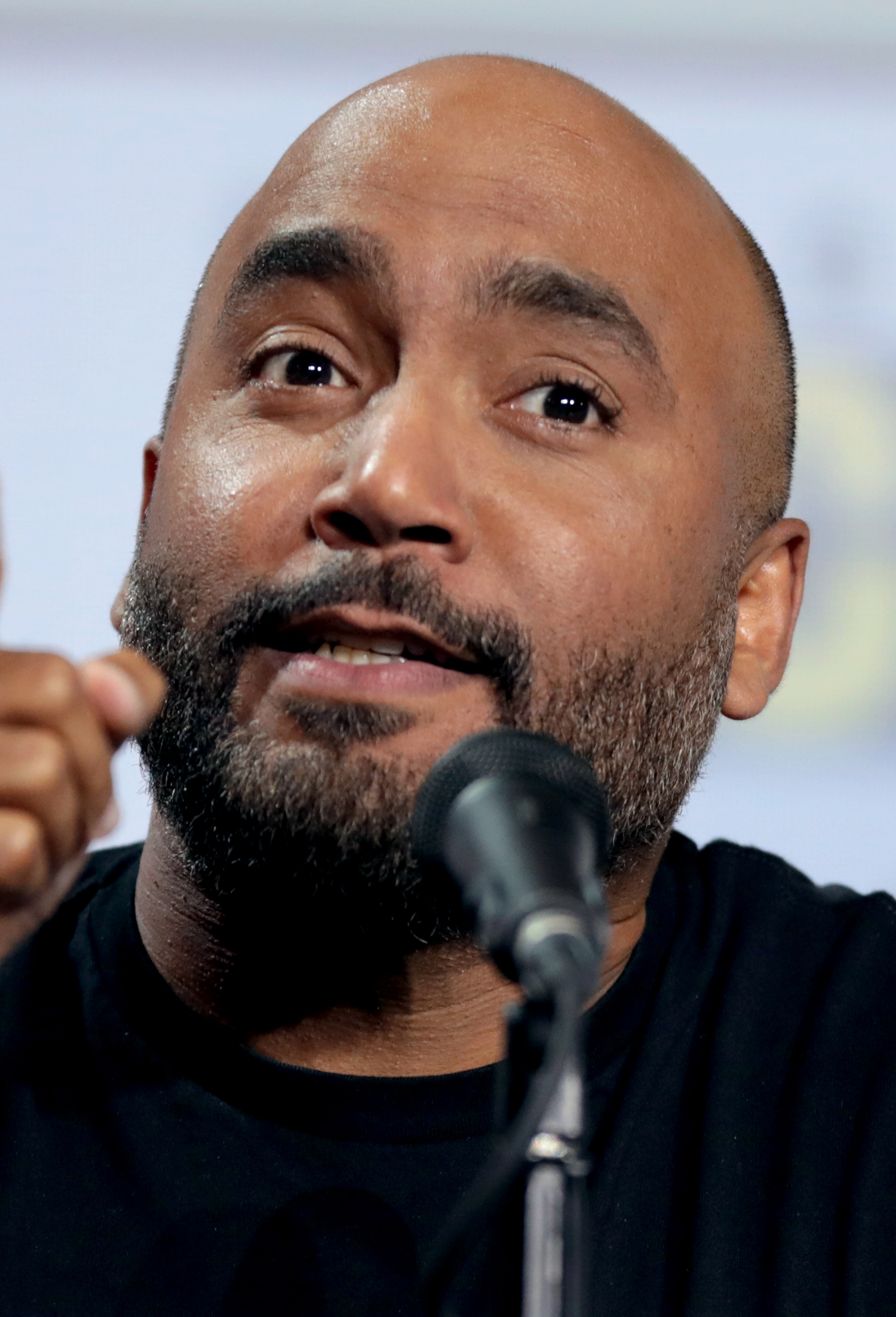
Shaun Escayg

Gallant and Escayg led development of The Last of Us Part I as game director and creative director, replacing original directors Bruce Straley and Neil Druckmann, respectively.

The Last of Us Part I was developed by Naughty Dog and published by Sony Interactive Entertainment. Development was led by game director Matthew Gallant and creative director Shaun Escayg, who replaced original directors Bruce Straley and Neil Druckmann, respectively. Gallant previously worked as a combat designer on the original game and Uncharted 4: A Thief's End (2016), and became lead systems designer on The Last of Us Part II (2020), co-leading its accessibility features. Escayg was lead cinematic animator on The Last of Us—his first game—and creative director on Uncharted: The Lost Legacy (2017), followed by his work as creative director and co-writer of Marvel's Avengers (2020) at Crystal Dynamics, before returning to Naughty Dog in April 2021. Splitting their directing duties, Escayg took responsibility for the cinematics. Gallant found he resonated with the themes much more closely than during the development of the original game, having become a father in the interim. According to Escayg, the team approached the remake as "a love letter to our fans, to the franchise, and to ourselves as developers"; they felt a responsibility to preserve its essence and quality. Several of the creative leadership team of Part I worked on the original game.

Naughty Dog hoped the remake would allow Part I and Part II to be played sequentially with no technological or visual discrepancies. They felt new audiences, such as viewers of the television adaptation and new PlayStation 5 players, could be reached. The remake was partially inspired by Part II's flashback scenes, for which the team rebuilt areas and assets from the original game: Gallant said that several team members pondered if "the whole game looked as good as those flashback sequences, how exciting that would be". Development began by transitioning the game to Part II's updated game engine. The game was rebuilt to use the PlayStation 5 hardware, requiring new art direction, animation, and character models. The technological and graphical enhancements were intended to align with the vision of the original game's team. Escayg wanted each element to make the player feel grounded and immersed in the world. The team re-evaluated thousands of "micro decisions" during development, removing objects deemed unimportant or distracting and detailing or redesigning those that required improvements. Areas were re-evaluated to determine if their designs were a result of the PlayStation 3's technical limitations; where appropriate, some areas were rebuilt or further detailed.

The developers rationalized the rebuilt accessibility features as important to the remake. They expanded the features from Part II—assisted by Part I being built in Part II's engine—with three presets configuring settings recommended for players requiring hearing, motor, or visual aids. During the development of The Last of Us Part II, blind accessibility consultant Brandon Cole noted that visually impaired players missed environmental context and the unspoken interactions between characters, but the production timeline limited the team's ability to implement a solution. Gallant revisited the idea for Part I and collaborated with Descriptive Video Works to create audio descriptions for cutscenes. Writing and recording the audio descriptions caused difficulties, as they had to convey the information succinctly while maintaining the context and themes. The customizable vibration options were inspired by a review of Uncharted: Legacy of Thieves Collection (2022) from Can I Play That?, which criticized the lack of variability. The team identified sequences that would present accessibility problems—such as the arcade sequence in Left Behind—and engaged several consultants for assistance, including Cole.

The combat system—particularly melee—evolved using development tools from Part II. The team felt the original game's combat sequences were iconic and required no significant overhaul; they forwent the ability to go prone in gameplay—a feature added in Part II—as it would have "broken the gameplay and the combat space" since the original game was not built for it. Part II's dodge mechanic was similarly omitted as it required reworking both enemy attacks and the gameplay space, and would diminish the claustrophobia and tension of the fights; Gallant noted "Joel fundamentally needs to feel different than playing as Ellie", Part II's playable protagonist. PlayStation 3 hardware limitations forced the original team to "hack together" combat sequences, including some that are pre-scripted; advancements on the PlayStation 5 allowed the developers to create dynamic encounters, with AI directing the enemy NPCs to investigate and analyze with more accuracy. The fundamental AI technology built upon Part II's. While the original game was limited to eight NPCs during enemy encounters—forcing some to disregard the player in the presence of others—the PlayStation 5 allows up to 128 active NPCs focusing on the player. In some instances, the original game could not have both male and female Infected fighting simultaneously, which was corrected in the remake. Gallant found the new technology made gameplay sequences more unpredictable.

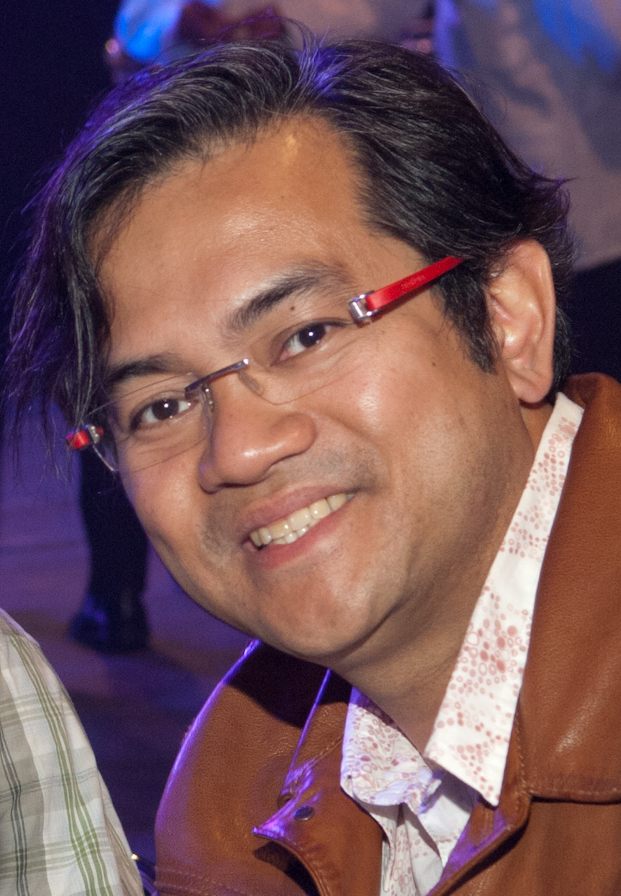
Erick Pangilinan, co-art director on the original game, returned in the same role for The Last of Us Part I.

The visual departments analyzed the original game to understand it better, focusing development resources on the most crucial scenes and storylines to maximize their impact. Rather than simply improving the visuals, the team analyzed its cutscenes and narrative beats, employing modernized techniques to emphasize story moments. Art director Erick Pangilinan ensured that the team remembered the original direction and purpose behind each scene; in some instances during development, they lost track of the original purpose, which would impact other scenes later on. The original game's vision was to emphasize the world's beauty, as opposed to a visually dark and dystopian image; art director Sebastian Gromann felt that PlayStation 5 allowed a truer realization of this vision, particularly due to the more complex models and shaders allowing increased fidelity and volume of foliage. Characters and environments benefited from an increased polygon count. The original motion capture data was used for the cinematics, with the facial animation overhauled to more closely resemble the original performances. The remake was considered a good opportunity to expand some environments, such as adding detail and items to the back offices of the Boston museum, and visually shifting the university section for a more claustrophobic feeling. The team forced themselves to pull back on some additions as they failed to heighten the experience or fit within the narrative context; trees and overgrowth were initially added to the military city, but removed when the team realized it would be unrealistic in the setting.

The addition of a speedrunning mode was suggested by one of the team members interested in the field, and the developers consulted with professional speedrunners. Gallant felt the permadeath mode raised the stakes of the original game's already-tense combat. The developers used the PlayStation 5's Tempest Engine—an evolution of technology from the PlayStation 4—to render the 3D audio, including during quieter moments of dialogue. Audio programmers spent over a year reworking Naughty Dog's audio engine, as it was incompatible with the Tempest Engine's features. The audio mixing and mastering processes were overhauled for increased clarity and fidelity. The team reused much of the sound from the original game as they considered it iconic; some of the re-recorded audio included the workbench upgrades, as well as murmuration for the Infected, introduced in Part II. The actors' original performances were maintained.

== Release ==
The existence of a remake of The Last of Us was first reported in April 2021 by Bloomberg News's Jason Schreier. The report claimed the game, codenamed "T1X", (Note: The original game was codenamed "T1".) had started at Sony's Visual Arts Support Group studio but was later moved under Naughty Dog's budget after some staff joined the project in 2020. A PlayStation Store listing with a trailer and information about the game was prematurely released on June 9, 2022. The game was announced for PlayStation 5 and Windows later that day at Summer Game Fest. Reactions to the announcement were mixed, as some journalists and players considered another release following The Last of Us Remastered superfluous and questioned the US$70 price point.

Naughty Dog announced special edition versions granting in-game upgrades and skills; the physical special edition includes a SteelBook case and comic series The Last of Us: American Dreams (2013) with new cover art. All key art and covers were designed by David Blatt, known as Kopfstoff, who was contracted after becoming known for his fan art of the games. The United States-exclusive Firefly Edition for PlayStation 5 sold out within an hour of its announcement; it received a restock at release, which sold out within seconds. Several players reported receiving damaged versions of the Firefly Edition due to poor packaging; Sony offered store discounts or refunds in some instances, but did not provide replacements. For the Windows release, the Firefly Edition was available in the United States and some European countries, containing a digital version of the game for Steam.

Development—which did not involve any crunch, unlike several of Naughty Dog's previous games—ceased by July 11, 2022, as the game was submitted for manufacturing. The final pre-launch trailer was released on August 24, and the game was released for PlayStation 5 on September 2. A two-hour trial was released for PlayStation Plus Premium members on January 15, 2023, coinciding with the television adaptation's premiere. The Windows version, co-developed by Iron Galaxy, was announced with a trailer at the Game Awards in December 2022; it missed its original release date of March 3, delayed in February to March 28. The PlayStation 5 version was updated in October 2024 to target higher resolutions and frame rates on the PlayStation 5 Pro. The Last of Us Complete—a bundle featuring Part I and Part II Remastered—was released digitally on April 10, 2025, set to be followed by a physical collector's edition on July 10, featuring a SteelBook case, art prints, and American Dreams.

== Reception ==
=== Critical response ===
==== PlayStation 5 version ====
PlayStation 5 version

Aggregate score
Aggregator	Score
Metacritic	89/100

Review scores
Publication	Score
Electronic Gaming Monthly	5/5
GameRevolution	8/10
GameSpot	8/10
GamesRadar+	4/5
Hardcore Gamer	4/5
IGN	9/10
Push Square	8/10
Video Games Chronicle	5/5
VG247	4/5
VideoGamer.com	9/10

The Last of Us Part I received "generally favorable" reviews from critics for the PlayStation 5 version, according to review aggregator website Metacritic. It was praised for its graphical enhancements, updated facial animations, improved enemy and character AI, and its added accessibility, audio, and controller options, though the response to its gameplay and level design was mixed. Many reviewers considered it the definitive version of the game; VG247's Tom Orry named it "one of the best remakes I've ever played". Several reviewers questioned the necessity of the game, especially considering its price and the existence of The Last of Us Remastered; conversely, some critics compared it to a film remaster on an Ultra HD Blu-ray, seen as an acceptable practice in its industry. The omission of the multiplayer mode was lamented by critics. GameRevolution's Jason Faulkner found the absence of story additions to be "some huge missed opportunities", and Game Informer's Blake Hester felt the lack of narrative changes exacerbated the outdated presentation of its themes.

IGN's Luke Reilly considered the game an effective graphical showcase for the PlayStation 5. Michael Goroff of Electronic Gaming Monthly (EGM) wrote that while the original game captured how players visualized a post-apocalyptic world, the remake's art style and graphics are more akin to how Joel or Ellie saw the world: "overgrown and dingy ... but it can also be beautiful or even mundane". The Verge's Andrew Webster compared the improved graphics to modern blockbusters, and Siliconera's Josh Tolentino wrote that it matched his memory of the original. Ars Technica's Sam Machkovech praised the visual improvements but felt that the original did not require a full overhaul like Demon's Souls (2020), while Shacknews's TJ Denzer criticized the fuzzier visuals of Listen Mode. Critics praised the improved lighting system and minimalized user interface; The Telegraph's Dan Silver considered the former award-worthy, and EGM's Goroff felt the game never lost its narrative tone despite more realistic lighting.

Several reviewers considered the improved character models Part I's strongest feature.

Several reviewers considered the improved character models and facial animation the remake's greatest feature. EGM's Goroff and IGN's Reilly found they made the acting more effective, with new microexpressions adding depth to each character, which Ars Technica's Machkovech compared to awarded film performances. Game Informer's Hester similarly observed the performances as more accurate and emotive without the original's awkwardness, and Video Games Chronicle's Jordan Middler found the remake captured the intention of story and character moments where the original technologically could not. Alex Avard of GamesRadar+ felt that even briefly-seen NPCs looked better than Joel and Ellie did in the original, and Denzer of Shacknews said that the characters "look far less doll-like and emote far better".

Critics praised improvements to enemy and companion AI. Ars Technica's Machkovech compared the combat sequences to the original game's scripted reveal trailer, and GameSpot's Jake Dekker found the improvements led to more tense and difficult encounters. Hardcore Gamer's Kevin Dunsmore echoed this sentiment but noted some "wonkiness remains" from the original, with companions failing to follow correct paths. IGN's Reilly lamented the omission of Part II's pre-scripted enemy names but otherwise praised the improvements to enemy AI. Siliconera's Tolentino found the changes superficial due to the identical map layouts and encounter designs, while EGM's Goroff felt the behavior remained simplistic, with enemies hasty to approach their fallen allies.

GameSpot's Dekker found the gameplay improved in line with the story, with more responsive aiming, heavier weapons, and easier movements. The Telegraph's Silver found the updated controls made combat smoother, while VG247's Orry said they retained "a slight clunkiness" but ultimately led to more tense gameplay encounters. Gene Park of The Washington Post lauded the realistic gun controls and called Joel's movement "appropriately heavy"; likewise, Reilly of IGN noted that Joel and Ellie felt weightier and more realistic but lamented the lack of Part II's dodge mechanic. Other reviewers similarly felt that combat and level design failed to compare to Part II's, though recognized the former as a vast improvement of the original. GamesRadar+'s Avard found the combat changes minimal, while Ars Technica's Machkovech felt the gameplay "still feels like a PlayStation 3 game" at worst. The A.V. Club's William Hughes enjoyed the combat but found it could occasionally "tip over from 'exhilarating' to 'frustrating'".

Reviewers praised the new options and features. GameSpot's Dekker wrote that The Last of Us Part I "sets a new standard for accessibility in games". Siliconera's Tolentino called it one of the most accessible games, and Ars Technica's Machkovech found its options more robust than any other. The A.V. Club's Hughes considered the accessibility options the only worthy addition, and Shacknews's Denzer highlighted the cutscene audio descriptions as a standout option. Ben Bayliss of Can I Play That? lauded the range of features for demonstrating "what is possible when a remake is done well", though noted some mobility problems and criticized the complexity required to balance different options. Critics lauded the use of the DualSense's haptic feedback, considered among the best uses to date alongside Astro's Playroom (2020). VideoGamer.com's Josh Wise felt the controller "added crunch to the combat" and The Verge's Webster lauded its use of the bow. Avard of GamesRadar+ found that 3D audio made the Infected more terrifying; the tension and horror led The Verge's Webster to play without headphones and VG247's Orry to mute the sound, while Push Square's Barker noted its effectiveness led to limited usage of Listen Mode.

==== Windows version ====
Windows version

Aggregate score
Aggregator	Score
Metacritic	59/100

Review scores
Publication	Score
GameStar	77/100
MeriStation	4.5/10
PC Gamer (UK)	50/100
PC Games (DE)	8/10
The Games Machine (Italy)	9.3/10
CD-Action	4.5/10
GamingBolt	5/10
Inverse	6/10
Multiplayer.it	7.5/10

The Windows version received "mixed or average" reviews according to Metacritic; it is Naughty Dog's lowest-rated game. Reviewers were not provided with advance copies until minutes before the game's public release. Eurogamer's Richard Leadbetter described the game as "effectively a beta", citing poor optimization and intense system requirements; MeriStation's Salva Fernandez felt it was not ready for release in its published state, and Gamereactor's Petter Hegevall named it "the worst optimized PC conversion" since 2021's Grand Theft Auto: The Trilogy – The Definitive Edition. PC Gamer's Phil Iwaniuk lamented scoring the game poorly but considered it necessary as the problems were "a real barrier" preventing the experience.

Several reviewers praised the remake's technical and visual improvements, but criticized its optimization, system requirements, and performance problems; GamingBolt's Shunal Doke called it "unplayable", and some critics recommended waiting to play until after performance problems were addressed. Conversely, The Games Machine's Emanuel Feronato noted a lack of problems even on higher settings. GameSpot's Alessandro Barbosa praised the extensive settings options, though Inverse's Grant Stoner found the limited key bindings customization disappointing in light of Naughty Dog's accessibility focus. CD-Action's Paweł Raban criticized the default keyboard controls, opting for a controller.

The port was poorly received by players, with a "mostly negative" rating on Steam based on over 9,000 reviews. Users cited performance problems such as inconsistent frame rates, poor optimization, and frequent crashes; some reported the game took hours to compile shaders and others shared glitches like broken character models, vibrant colors, and characters dripping with water. Conversely, some users noted they had not encountered problems, even on lower-end computers. Naughty Dog said it would investigate complaints and address problems through updates, focusing on shader loading times, instability and graphical problems, and crashing caused by potential memory leaks. Engadget's Nathan Ingraham wrote performance had improved on the Steam Deck after the first update, though some reviewers and players felt problems persisted; Valve listed the game as "unsupported" in early April. Within days, Steam reviews improved to "mixed". Reviewers concurred performance had improved after several weeks but some problems remained. The game was "verified" on Steam Deck in June.

=== Accolades ===
The Last of Us Part I won Outstanding Visual Effects in a Real-Time Project at the 21st Visual Effects Society Awards. It was nominated for PlayStation Game of the Year at the 40th Golden Joystick Awards, Innovation in Accessibility at the Game Awards 2022, and Technical Achievement at the 19th British Academy Games Awards. From PlayStation Blog, the game was named runner-up for Best Accessibility Features and Best Story, and placed third for Soundtrack of the Year. The launch trailer was awarded Gold at the 2023 Clio Entertainment Awards.

Award	Date	Category	Recipient(s) and nominee(s)	Result	Ref.
British Academy Games Awards	March 30, 2023	Technical Achievement	The Last of Us Part I	Nominated	
Clio Entertainment Awards	November 9, 2023	Games: Audio / Visual	The Last of Us Part I Launch Trailer	Gold	
The Game Awards	December 8, 2022	Innovation in Accessibility	The Last of Us Part I	Nominated	
Golden Joystick Awards	November 22, 2022	PlayStation Game of the Year	The Last of Us Part I	Nominated	
The Steam Awards	January 2, 2024	Best Soundtrack Award	The Last of Us Part I	Won	
Visual Effects Society Awards	February 15, 2023	Outstanding Visual Effects in a Real-Time Project	Erick Pangilinan, Evan Wells, Eben Cook, Mary Jane Whiting	Won	

== Sales ==
In the United States, The Last of Us Part I was the fifth-best-selling game of September 2022, and the fourth-best-selling PlayStation game. In the United Kingdom, it topped the weekly physical sales chart in its opening weekend, dropping to fourth in its second week. Combining digital and physical sales, it was the fifth-best-selling game of the month. In Japan, it was the fifth-best-selling retail game of its first week, with 10,954 copies sold. It was the third-most-downloaded PlayStation 5 game of the month of release in Europe and North America, dropping in North America to eleventh in October, eighteenth in November, and twentieth in December.

Following the debut of the television adaptation of The Last of Us in January 2023, the game became the eighth-most-downloaded in North America and tenth in Europe, and sixth and seventh, respectively, in February. It rose to the eleventh-best-selling game in the United States in January, climbing 25 positions from the previous month, and reentered the retail charts in the United Kingdom with a 238 percent increase in weekly sales—305 percent including digital sales—and a further 32 percent the following week. Within four weeks of release, the Windows version had sold 368,000 units, generating US$15.5 million in revenue. According to a report by Virtuous and IDG Consulting, Part I sold over two million units by March 2024, one of the only two remakes released within ten years of the original game to do so. The game's addition to PlayStation Plus's catalog in September 2024 saw a 1,225% boost in players in the first week, and a 29% increase in monthly players.
