= Joel (The Last of Us) =

Video game character

Joel Miller
- The Last of Us character
- Joel as he appears in the first game
- First appearance: The Last of Us (2013)
- Created by: Neil Druckmann
- Portrayed by: Troy Baker (video games); Pedro Pascal (TV series)

In-universe information
- Children: Sarah (daughter, deceased)
- Relatives: Tommy (brother); Maria (sister-in-law); Javier (father)
- Origin: Austin, Texas, U.S.

Joel Miller is a character in the video game series The Last of Us by Naughty Dog. He is portrayed by Troy Baker through performance capture in the games, and by Pedro Pascal in the television adaptation. In the first game, The Last of Us (2013), Joel serves as the main protagonist and is tasked with escorting the young Ellie across a post-apocalyptic United States in an attempt to create a potential cure for an infection to which Ellie is immune. He also appears briefly in the downloadable content campaign The Last of Us: Left Behind (2014). Joel is killed in The Last of Us Part II (2020) by a woman named Abby, whose father he murdered in the first game, prompting Ellie to seek revenge.

Joel was created by Neil Druckmann, the creative director and writer of The Last of Us. The character's casting was extensive, as his relationship with Ellie was imperative to the game; it was the central focus of the first game's development, with all other elements developed around it. Baker inspired aspects of Joel's personality, making the character more emotional than initially pitched. Druckmann wanted players, especially parents, to relate to Joel through his bonding with Ellie. He considered the character morally complex. For Part II, Druckmann felt that Joel's character arc was complete after the original, and his death was a core part of the game's development.

The character has been well-received by critics, including his chemistry with Ellie and the likability and complexity of the character. Baker's performance in both games was highly praised and received numerous awards and nominations. Pascal's performance in the television series was similarly praised and awarded.

== Creation ==
The development team of The Last of Us spent more time selecting the actor for Joel than Ellie, as the chemistry between the two characters was imperative to the game. After Troy Baker and Ellie actress Ashley Johnson played alongside each other, the team realized that the former perfectly fit the role of Joel, despite the actor's young age. Creative director Neil Druckmann attributed Baker's voice and movement to the team's choice of casting him. Baker contributed greatly to the development of the character; for example, he convinced Druckmann that Joel would care for Tess due to his loneliness. When designing Joel's physical appearance, the team tried to make him look "flexible enough" to allow for him to appear as both a "ruthless operator in the underground of a quarantined city" as well as a "caring father figure to Ellie". His appearance was aimed to evoke "rural Americana", referencing values of self-reliance and ingenuity when facing hardship and deprivation. The team experimented with his appearance to determine his age in the game.

The art design team experimented with Joel's appearance throughout development to determine his age in The Last of Us.

When writing Joel, Druckmann initially took inspiration from Josh Brolin's portrayal of Llewelyn Moss in No Country for Old Men (2007), which he saw as "very quiet, very cool under pressure". However, Baker's interpretation of Joel as a more emotional person evolved the character in a different way. Ultimately, the narrative became an exploration of how willing a father is to save a child; initially, Joel is willing to sacrifice himself, before evolving where he is willing to sacrifice his friends, until finally feeling that he would sacrifice all of humanity in order to save Ellie.

Druckmann felt that players, specifically parents, would be able to relate to Joel's character and his bonding with Ellie. Baker believes that Joel discovers morality throughout the game's narrative, working out the difference between loss and sacrifice, and his true personality begins to show. Druckmann became intrigued by players who discussed Joel's morality, distinguishing him as a hero or villain; Druckmann felt that Joel was only "a complex person who's made good and bad decisions", but allowed it to be open to interpretation. When auditioning for the role, Baker read a phrase on the character sheet that stated Joel had "few moral lines left to cross", which became the "anchor point" to the character for him. Baker found great difficulty in filming the game's prologue, which features scenes with Joel and his daughter Sarah, portrayed by Hana Hayes. Upon later viewing of the first day of footage from the scene, Druckmann felt that it could still be improved. When filming the scene again, Druckmann explained to Baker how to perform it, and felt that it was the best take upon doing so. Though Baker initially found the take too "mechanical", he retroactively realized that he had been trying to impress audiences by his acting, and that it was "not what the scene needed".

Druckmann felt that Joel's character arc was complete after the first game. Joel's death was a core part of the narrative structure of The Last of Us Part II from early in development; Druckmann considered it one of the most difficult to write, rehearse, and shoot. Though it initially caused some internal resistance, the team felt compelled when more of the narrative was built out. An early version of Joel's death scene had him utter "Sarah", his daughter's name, until Baker suggested that he should remain silent. While Sarah's death in the first game intended to evoke sadness, Joel's death aims to elicit anger. Ellie was originally absent during the scene, and was to be informed by Joel's brother Tommy, but Druckmann felt that witnessing the death through Ellie's perspective emphasized the anger of the player. He wanted it to be portrayed as "gross, unceremonious, and humiliating" instead of heroic; it was originally more gruesome, but later toned down as the gore was not crucial to the scene. He predicted that it might lead to negative reactions, but felt it was necessary to tell the story; he particularly felt that Naughty Dog's notability in the industry gave it the opportunity to take risks that other developers can not. In an earlier version of the scene, Abby stabbed Joel in the back and twisted the knife to paralyze him; however, as knives are more closely associated with Ellie, the team replaced it with a golf club, partly inspired by an incident in Druckmann's youth.

=== Television series ===
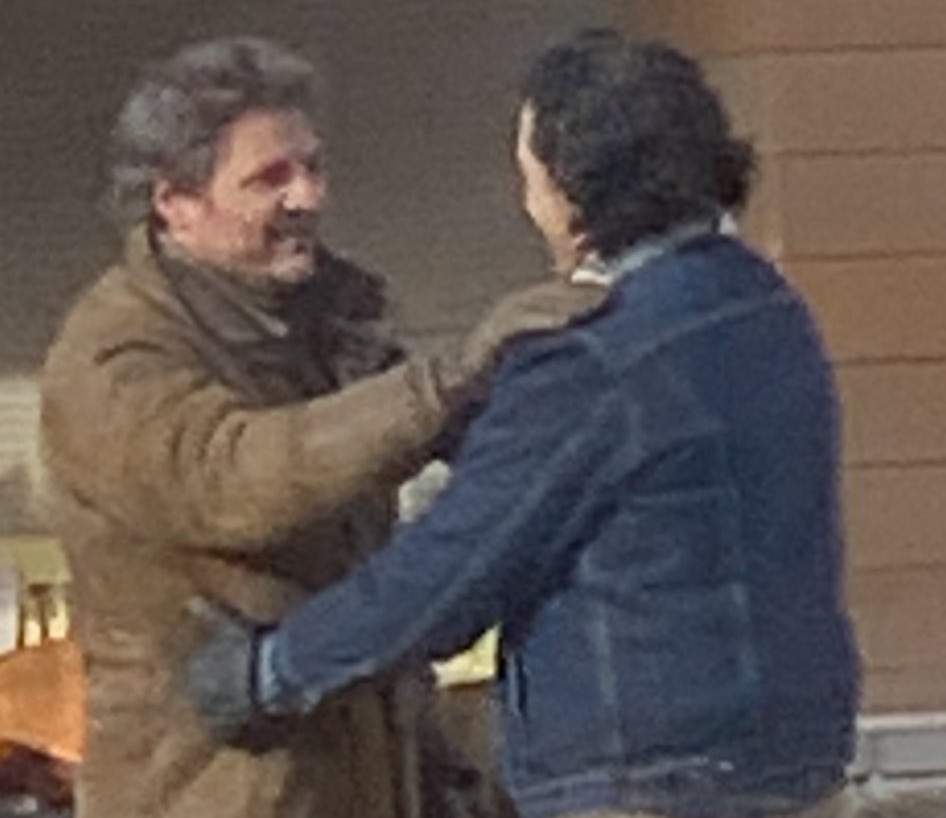
Pedro Pascal (left) filming the first season of The Last of Us in Canmore, Alberta, in November 2021, alongside Gabriel Luna as Tommy (right)

Pedro Pascal was cast as Joel in HBO's television adaptation of the video games on February 10, 2021. Earlier that day, it was reported Mahershala Ali was offered the role of Joel after Matthew McConaughey turned it down; The Hollywood Reporter noted Ali "did circle a role" in the show, but a deal was never formed. Pascal became available for a new series after the release of the second season of The Mandalorian, attracting several offers for projects from large networks, of which he chose The Last of Us, partly to work with co-creator Craig Mazin. Mazin and Druckmann had been considering Pascal for some time. He accepted the role within 24 hours; The Mandalorian producers gave Pascal permission to work on the series. He was reportedly earning US$600,000 per episode, making him one of the highest-paid American television stars.

Pascal was chosen for his ability to portray a tough, tortured, and vulnerable character who suppresses his emotions until necessary. A non-gamer, Pascal watched his nephew play the beginning of the first game because he lacked the skill to play it himself; he found Joel to be "so impressive" but was concerned about imitating the games too closely, instead choosing to "create a healthy distance" and allow the showrunners to decide the characterization. Pascal based Joel's voice on his own experiences growing up in San Antonio, Texas, paring it back from the game's Southern accent. Baker, who was cast as James in the episode "When We Are in Need", was glad that Pascal did not simply mimic his own performance as Joel, noting he brought "a different inherent sensibility".

== Character ==
In the prologue of The Last of Us, Joel is depicted as a sensitive single parent who is emotionally engaged with his daughter. After her death and the 20 years that follow, during which Joel witnessed more horrific events, he has significantly changed, using violence to solve issues and showing reluctance when asked to escort Ellie. Joel is often described as an antihero. He is a hardened survivor whose obsession with survival is fueled by his desensitization due to his daughter's death. Joel's years of survival have led him to become resourceful, practical, and emotionally impenetrable, although he is still traumatized and vulnerable. He avoids becoming attached to others as he would fear losing them. Each of his movements show his age and experience, carrying the weight of the lives lost. As the game progresses, Joel becomes more sensitive to Ellie, and speaks to her in a manner previously only reserved for his daughter. Joel's act of saving Ellie in the first game's conclusion shows that he has become too sentimental and attached to Ellie to "do the 'right thing'", a trope often demonstrated in male heroes. His act is seen by some as one of redemption, and by others as one of selfishness.

== Appearances ==
Originally from Texas, Joel was a single father in his late 20s or early 30s (Note: Joel was initially described as being "in his late forties" in The Last of Us (2013) while in-game details in The Last of Us Part I (2022) list his birth year as 1981, putting him in his early 50s.) when the initial Cordyceps outbreak occurred. Fleeing his home near Austin with his brother Tommy and his 12-year-old daughter Sarah, they got involved in a firefight with a soldier; Sarah was mortally wounded and died in his arms, leaving him traumatized. In the 20 years that followed, Joel did whatever he had to do to survive. In the time spent in the brutal post-apocalyptic world, still bitter from his daughter's death, Joel became a hardened survivor who was physically and mentally tough. He has a brutal fighting style and is capable of defeating much younger men in hand-to-hand combat.

20 years after Sarah's death, Joel works as a smuggler in the Boston quarantine zone, ruled by a military dictatorship, with his friend and partner Tess. While searching for a former accomplice who stole some of their merchandise, Joel and Tess are tasked by Marlene, an acquaintance and leader of a rebel militia called the Fireflies, to smuggle the 14-year-old Ellie to a rendezvous point. Making their way there, Joel discovers that Ellie is immune to the infection. Upon their arrival, Tess reveals that she has become infected and insists that Joel finds Tommy, a former Firefly, in order to continue the mission. Joel is initially surly and short towards Ellie, though he begins to warm up to her as their journey continues. This is compounded when Joel, having initially asked Tommy to carry on in his place after meeting up with him at Tommy's settlement in Jackson, changes his mind and carries on as planned. Their bond deepens when Ellie nearly loses Joel to a severe injury, and when he comes to her aid after she is nearly killed by a band of cannibals in Colorado. Ultimately, Joel shows his devotion to Ellie when he chooses to rescue her from the Firefly doctors who plan to remove and examine her brain, as opposed to allowing her to die. To ensure they are not pursued, Joel kills Marlene. Driving away, Ellie wakes up, and Joel tells her the doctors gave up on discovering a cure. Ellie soon confronts him about the events, and Joel swears to her that he is telling the truth.

Joel and Ellie build a life in Jackson with Tommy. In the prologue of The Last of Us Part II, Joel confesses his guilt to Tommy over lying to Ellie. Flashbacks in the game show Joel taking Ellie on a birthday trip to a museum, and later finally admitting the truth to her after she travels back to the hospital to find out for herself. Four years after the first game, with their relationship strained, Joel expresses to Ellie that he does not regret stopping the Fireflies, and Ellie promises to try and forgive him. While on patrol the following day, Joel and Tommy save a stranger named Abby from the infected and they escape a large horde, returning to a lookout run by Abby's group. After they exchange names, however, Joel and Tommy are swiftly attacked by Abby's group, revealed to be ex-Fireflies who are now part of the Washington Liberation Front (WLF), a militia based in Seattle. Ellie finds them but is assaulted and watches helplessly as Abby beats Joel to death with a golf club; it is later revealed that Abby's father was the lead Firefly surgeon killed by Joel while saving Ellie, and that Abby and her group had sought revenge on him ever since.

== Reception ==
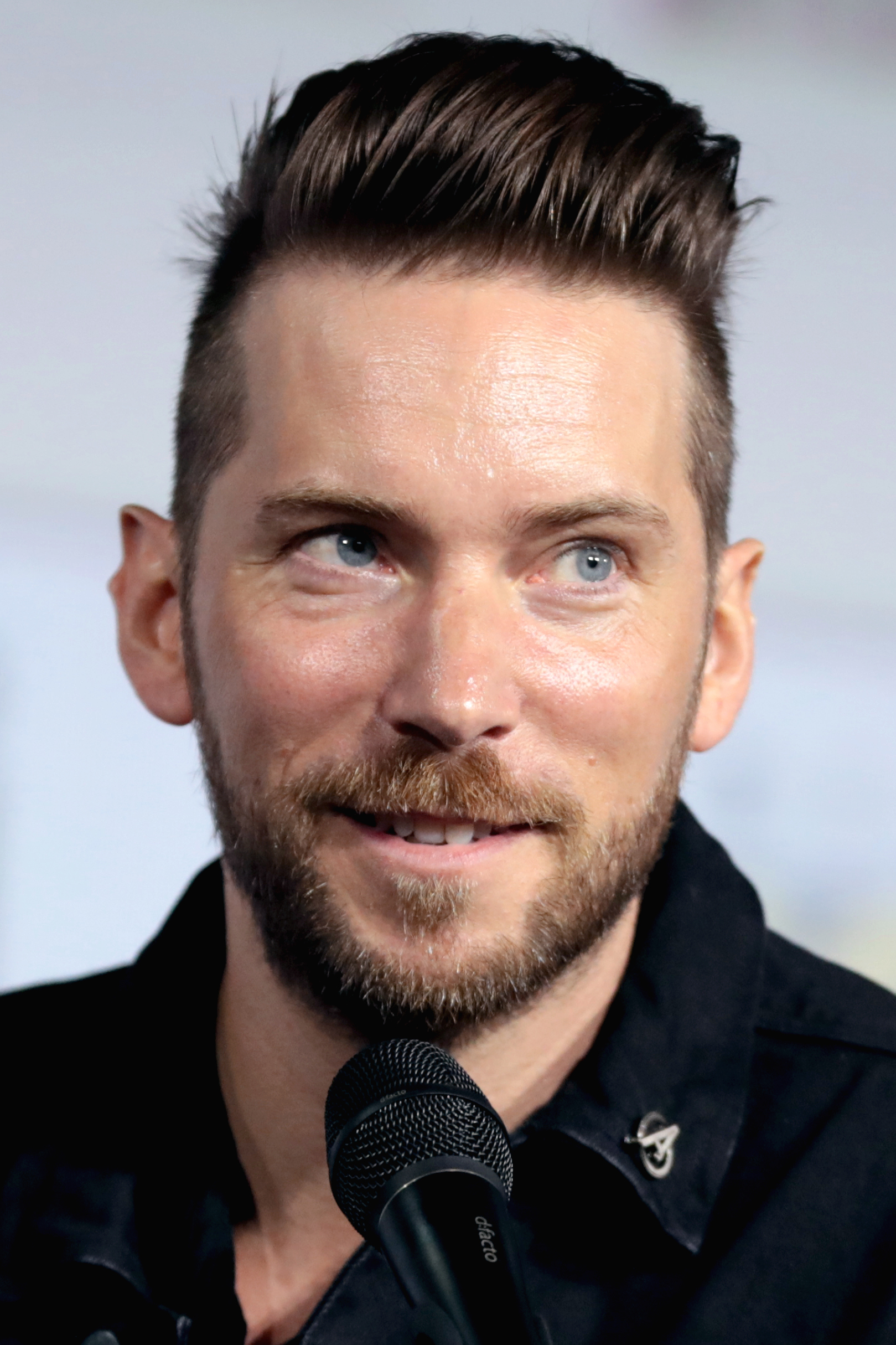
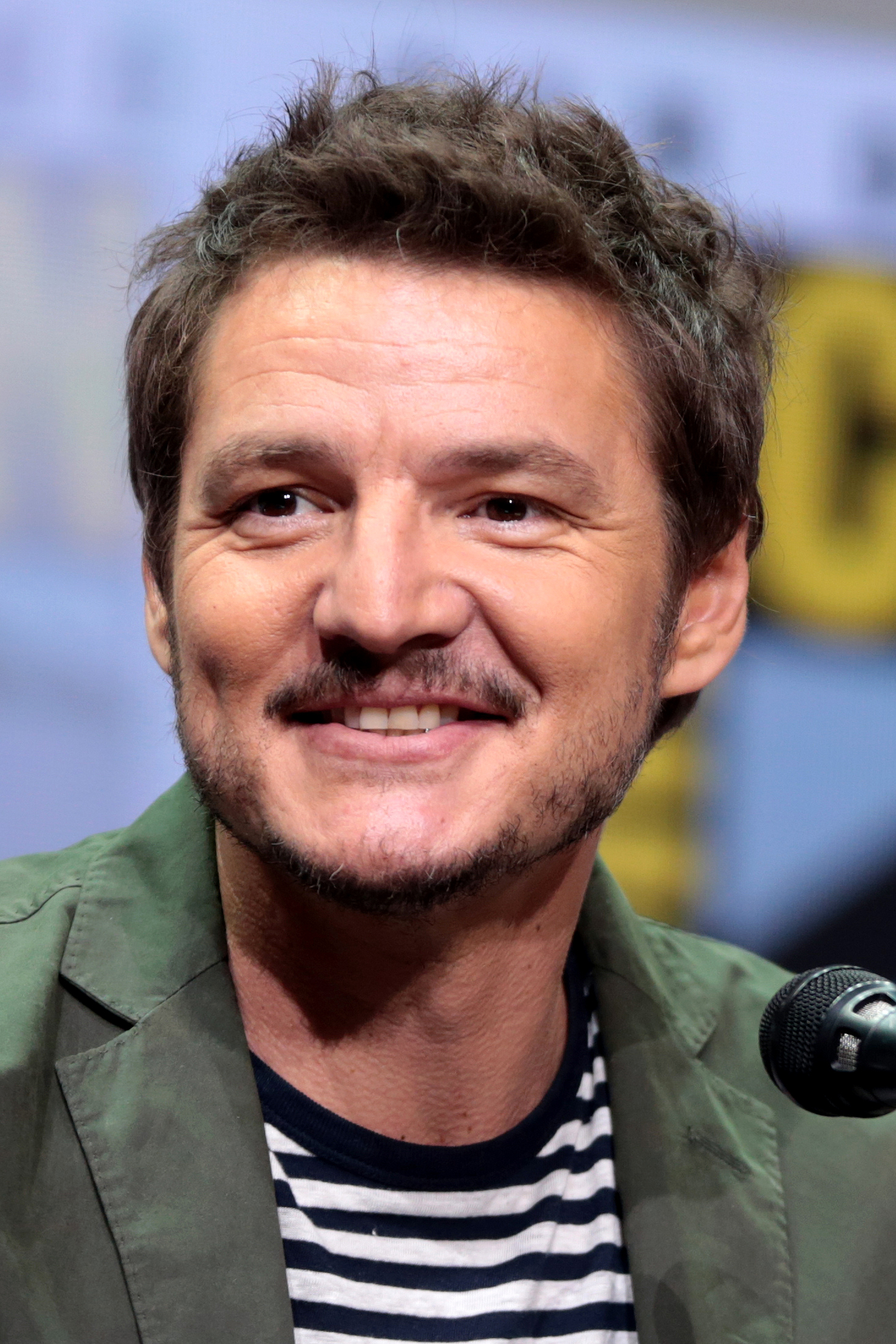
Troy Baker (left) and Pedro Pascal's performances as Joel in the video games and television series, respectively, received praise.

Joel's character received generally positive feedback. IGN's Colin Moriarty found that he cared about the character and considered him likable. Andy Kelly of Computer and Video Games wrote that Joel "has a likeable warmth in his laconic Texan drawl", and PlayStation Official Magazine's David Meikleham likened his "grizzled" Texan characterization to No Country for Old Men's Llewelyn Moss. James Stephanie Sterling of Destructoid found Joel likable despite his impatience and harsh tone. Eurogamer's Oli Welsh felt that, by the game's end, Joel and Ellie had "matured from clichés into rounded characters". Conversely, Tom Mc Shea of GameSpot found Joel unlikable and unrelatable.

Critics praised the relationship between Joel and Ellie. Matt Helgeson of Game Informer wrote that the relationship was "poignant" and "well-drawn", Joystiq's Richard Mitchell found it "genuine" and emotional, and IGN's Moriarty identified it as a highlight of the game. Eurogamer's Welsh felt the characters were developed with "real patience and skill". Philip Kollar of Polygon found the relationship was assisted by the game's optional conversations. Kimberly Wallace of Game Informer named Joel and Ellie one of the "best gaming duos of 2013", appreciating their interest in protecting each other. Game Informer's Kyle Hilliard compared Joel and Ellie's relationship to that of the Prince and Elika from Prince of Persia (2008), writing that both duos care deeply for one another, and praising the "emotional crescendo" in The Last of Us, which he judged had not been achieved in Prince of Persia. PlayStation Official Magazine's Meikleham named Joel and Ellie the best characters in a PlayStation 3 game.

Baker's performance received praise. Edge wrote that, alongside Johnson's Ellie, Baker "breathe[s] poignancy into the grace notes of the script". Anthony Severino of PlayStation LifeStyle felt that the performance made him care about the character, while Giancarlo Valdes of VentureBeat lauded Baker for adding "nuance and complexity" to the role. For his role in The Last of Us, Baker won Best Voice Actor at the Spike VGX, and was nominated for Best Performer from The Daily Telegraph, Outstanding Character Performance at the 17th Annual D.I.C.E. Awards and for Performer at the British Academy Video Games Awards. Baker's performance in The Last of Us Part II was similarly praised. GamesRadar+'s Alex Avard found that Baker "steals some of [the game's] best scenes as Joel" by adding complexities that enrich the character and relationships. Evan Lewis of Entertainment Weekly wrote that Baker "deserves every accolade possible for his heart-wrenching performance". IGN's Dornbush lauded Baker's performance for depicting the weariness of Joel. For his role, Baker won Outstanding Supporting Performance in a Drama at the National Academy of Video Game Trade Reviewers Awards, and was nominated for Performer in a Supporting Role at the 17th British Academy Games Awards.

In the television series, Pascal's performance and chemistry with Bella Ramsey's Ellie received high praise. Empire's John Nugent and /Film's Valerie Ettenhofer referred to Pascal's performance as the best of his career, citing his ability to portray nuance and rare vulnerability. TechRadar's Axel Metz described him as the "perfect real-world manifestation" of Joel. GameSpot's Mark Delaney said Pascal's performance in the first episode made him cry twice and lauded his ability to portray different sides of Joel; Push Square's Aaron Bayne found Pascal's performance reflected Joel's torment without speaking, In the fourth episode, The A.V. Club's David Cote enjoyed Pascal's warmth and humor, particularly in scenes in which he teaches Ellie. For his role, Pascal received awards at the Astra TV Awards, MTV Movie & TV Awards, People's Choice Awards, and Screen Actors Guild Awards, and received several nominations, including at the Golden Globe Awards, Television Critics Association Awards, and two at the Primetime Emmy Awards.

== Bibliography ==
- Cruea, Mark (October 2018). "(Re)reading Fatherhood: Applying Reader Response Theory to Joel's Father Role in the Last of Us". In Taylor, Nicholas; Voorhees, Gerald (eds.). Masculinities in Play. Palgrave Macmillan. pp. 93–108. doi:10.1007/978-3-319-90581-5_6. ISBN 978-3-319-90581-5.
- Druckmann, Neil; Straley, Bruce (June 2013). The Art of The Last of Us. United States of America: Dark Horse Comics.
- Gonzales, Gloria G. (2017). "Joel". In Banks, Jaime; Mejia, Robert; Adams, Aubrie (eds.). 100 Greatest Video Game Characters. Lanham, Maryland: Rowman & Littlefield. pp. 87–89. ISBN 978-1-4422-7813-4.
- Murray, Soraya (June 2019). "Playing Whiteness in Crisis in The Last of Us and Tomb Raider". Transactions of the Digital Games Research Association. 4 (3). Digital Games Research Association: 117–146. doi:10.26503/todigra.v4i3.102. ISSN 2328-9422. S2CID 55463712. Archived from the original on March 21, 2020.
