= Positional advantage =

Positional advantage is a combative position relative to an opponent. It is used extensively to describe a situation of significant tactical advantage over an opponent in open-hand conflict (i.e. without weapons) in William Cheung's Traditional Wing Chun Kung Fu and Ian Protheroe's Classical Wing Chun.

In physical altercations, positional advantage is significant because a defender who has attained positional advantage:

- is not as open to an attack from the attacker's rear hand
- may control the attacker's lead limbs (one arm and one leg)
- is in range to attack or defend both hands
- is able to redirect their opponent's force

In the words of Sifu Ian Protheroe, "as long as your strongest side is facing your opponent's weakest side, you have the advantage". Although positional advantage has been adopted specifically by Classical and Traditional Wing Chun practitioners, the term is applicable to all martial styles, both with and without weapons. Related concepts include centre and central line theory. These terms are used to describe many different things by Wing Chun practitioners (see the Wikipedia entry for Wing Chun for more information).
