= Casey Bond =

American actor

- Born: October 5, 1984 (age 41); Peachtree City, Georgia, U.S.
- Occupations: Actor; producer; former baseball player
- Spouse: Stacy Smith (m. 2016)

Casey Bond (born October 5, 1984) is an American actor, film producer and retired professional baseball player. He is most noted for playing Chad Bradford in the 2011 film Moneyball. Before becoming an actor, Bond played as an outfielder within the San Francisco Giants organization.

Bond attended Birmingham–Southern College and Lipscomb University, playing college baseball for both schools, before he was drafted by the Giants in 2007. After playing in minor league baseball for two seasons, the Giants released Bond in 2009. Rather than continue to pursue his baseball career, Bond chose to become an actor. In addition to Moneyball, Bond has appeared in Nashville, Ring the Bell, Undrafted, My Many Sons, I Saw the Light, Gene Simmons Family Jewels and various other films and commercials.

== Career ==
=== Baseball ===
Bond was raised in Peachtree City, Georgia. He attended Starr's Mill High School in Fayetteville, Georgia. He then enrolled at Birmingham–Southern College in Birmingham, Alabama, where he played college baseball for the Birmingham–Southern Panthers baseball team, competing in the Big South Conference in the National Collegiate Athletic Association's (NCAA) Division I. After his junior year at Birmingham-Southern, the school's president decided to move the Panthers' athletic programs from Division I to Division III, which required the team to take a hiatus for a season. This ultimately ended the baseball program at Birmingham-Southern as most players left to find a new program where they would be able to continue their college careers.

Bond transferred to Lipscomb University in Nashville, Tennessee, where he continued his college baseball career with the Lipscomb Bisons baseball team, competing in the Atlantic Sun Conference in NCAA's Division I. In his senior year, Bond started all 58 games on the Bisons' schedule and finished the season with a .326 batting average. He registered the tenth-most hits and third-most stolen bases in Lipscomb history for a single-season.

The San Francisco Giants drafted Bond as a center fielder in the 25th round of the 2007 Major League Baseball draft. They had intended to draft Bond in the 24th round, but instead selected Brock Bond, a second baseman from the University of Missouri, due to a clerical error. Bond played in the Giants' minor league system for two seasons. He debuted in professional baseball for the Arizona Giants of the Rookie-level Arizona League in 2007. Bond played for the Salem-Keizer Volcanoes of the Class A-Short Season Northwest League in 2008, where he had a .246 batting average and 15 stolen bases in 68 games played. He was called up to the Fresno Grizzlies of the Class AAA Pacific Coast League for at the end of the 2008 season. The Giants released Bond prior to spring training in 2009.

=== Acting ===
Bond took an acting class in Nashville with a friend during the 2008–09 offseason. Bond told his great-aunt, a former actress, and she introduced Bond to a talent agent. As Bond considered whether or not to sign with another baseball team after being released by the Giants, the agent set Bond up with an audition for a television commercial for One-A-Day Men's Vitamins. Bond flew to Los Angeles and was cast in the commercial. Becoming a member of the Screen Actors Guild, Bond next appeared as the "Handsome Handyman" in Gene Simmons Family Jewels before being given a role in Moneyball.

Bond was cast in the 2011 film Moneyball as Chad Bradford, a submarine-style pitcher. Bond contacted Ben Zobrist, who he had previously worked out with and who was a former teammate of Bradford's, and Zobrist introduced them.

Bond has taken acting classes with Larry Moss. He has appeared on the hit television show Nashville as "Gil Martin." It has been released that Bond is slated to play the role of "Tommy Dorehty" in the upcoming film Undrafted, which will be released sometime next year. It has also been rumored and confirmed that Bond is attached to play the role of "Country" in the film titled Diamonds Down Under. He has also appeared in commercials for Dick's Sporting Goods, Adidas, Nike, Inc., Blue Bunny, and others.

Bond has formed his own production company, called Higher Purpose Entertainment, and is producing an independent film about Lipscomb Bisons men's basketball coach Don Meyer under the working title My Many Sons, along with production partner Brad Wilson. He is expected to have a role in the movie. Bond has been cast to play the lead role of Jerry Meyer in the film, son of Coach Meyer, played by Judge Reinhold.

Bond played the role of Jerry Rivers in the Hank Williams biopic titled I Saw the Light.

Bond recently produced and acted in the movie The Meanest Man in Texas in which his company, Higher Purpose Entertainment, developed and produced the project. He played the role of Marvin Harper, who comes to know the infamous Clyde Thompson. The movie is based on the book of the same title.

== Personal life ==
Bond dated country music singer Sarah Marince from 2011 to 2013. Bond married Stacy Smith, a CPA, in December 2016.

== Filmography ==
=== Film ===
Year	Title	Role	Notes
2011	Moneyball	Chad Bradford	
2013	Ring the Bell	Danny 'Scooter' Cook	
2015	I Saw the Light	Jerry Rivers	
2015	Salvation Street	Marshall	
2016	Undrafted	Dorehty	
2016	Remember the Goal	FCA Coach	
2016	My Many Sons	Jerry Meyer	
2017	The Meanest Man in Texas	Marvin Harper	
2020	Greyhound	Helmsman #1	

=== Television ===
Year	Title	Role	Notes
2010	Melissa Peterman: Am I the Only One	'The' Audience Member	Television film
2010	Gene Simmons Family Jewels	Casey Bond	Episode: "Hunks and Hammers"
2013, 2017	Nashville	Councilperson / Gil Martin	2 episodes
2016	Casa Vita	Blake Barlow	Television film
