= Mateus Ward =

American actor (born 1999)

- Born: Mateus Cole Ward; January 18, 1999 (age 27); Burbank, California, U.S.
- Occupation: Actor
- Years active: 2010–present
- Website: mateusward.com

Mateus Cole Ward (born January 18, 1999) is an American actor. He is known for his roles as Jake Sanders in the CBS television series Hostages, and as Dustin Maker in the TNT television series Murder in the First. He is also known for his role as the older Stevie Botwin in the series finale of the Showtime comedy-drama series Weeds, and for his recurring role as Marcus Davenport on the Disney XD fantasy series Lab Rats.

== Career ==
Mateus' television debut came in 2010, where he won the role of Lyle DeLilly on Criminal Minds. Ward caught the eye of director Larry Charles, and he was cast as a series regular, the son of Ana Ortiz, in the 20th Century Fox sitcom pilot Outnumbered with Cheech Marin.

In 2011, Ward was asked to guest star on the sports comedy series Sports Show with Norm Macdonald on Comedy Central, for which he was nominated for a Young Artist Award and won an OMNI Youth Music and Actor Award, Outstanding Actor, in the 12- to 18-year-old category. Ward went on to land the role of Carl in the comedy-drama Parenthood.

In April 2012, Mateus landed a recurring guest star role as Marcus Davenport on the teen sitcom Lab Rats on Disney XD. Then he was offered the role of young Franky in his first feature film Lonely Boy, where he portrays a teenager with schizophrenia. In September of that year, he was cast in the two-part series finale of the comedy-drama Weeds, which aired on Showtime. Ward won a Young Artist Award for his portrayal of Stevie Botwin.

In 2013, Ward appeared in the police procedural drama television series NCIS on CBS. In the eleventh episode, titled "Shabbot Shalom", Ward played the role of Austin, a young teen who discovers a dead body. Mateus was also a series regular in the Jerry Bruckheimer television series Hostages produced by Warner Bros. Television for CBS, portraying Jake Sanders, the son of Dr. Ellen Sanders, portrayed by Toni Collette, and Brian Sanders, portrayed by Tate Donovan. In 2015, Ward was a series regular playing Dustin Maker on the Steven Bochco and Eric Lodal television series Murder in the First with Taye Diggs and Kathleen Robertson on TNT.

In 2016, Ward signed on to play the leading role of Clyde Thompson in the film The Meanest Man in Texas, a feature film adaptation of the book by the same name which was released theatrically. He is a producer and plays Levi in the feature film Relish.

== Filmography ==
=== Film ===
Year	Title	Role	Notes
2013	Lonely Boy	Young Franky	
2017	The Meanest Man in Texas	Clyde Thompson	
2019	Relish	Levi	
2024	There Is No Antimemetics Division	Clay	Short film

=== Television ===
Year	Title	Role	Notes
2010	Criminal Minds	Lyle DeLilly	Episode: "Remembrance of Things Past"
2011	Sports Show with Norm MacDonald	Boy	Episode: "Mascot"
2011	Parenthood	Carl	Episode: "Sore Loser"
2011	Outnumbered	Jake Tulley	TV movie
2012	Weeds	Stevie Botwin	2 episodes
2012	Victorious	7 year-old Jerald	Episode: “The Hambone King”
2012–2016	Lab Rats	Marcus Davenport	Recurring role, 8 episodes
2013	NCIS	Austin	Episode: "Shabbat Shalom"
2013–2014	Hostages	Jake Sanders	Main role, 15 episodes
2015	Murder in the First	Dustin Maker	Main role, 12 episodes
2016–2017, 2024	The Loud House	Hank, Big Kid #2, Groundskeeper Hank (voices)	3 episodes
2022	All Rise	Cyrus	Episode: "Through the Fire"

=== Video games ===
Year	Title	Role
2018	Red Dead Redemption 2	The Local Pedestrian Population
2021	Call of Duty: Vanguard	Voice Cast
2025	Doom: The Dark Ages	Marok
