= Relish (disambiguation) =

Relish is a cooked and pickled condiment made from chopped fruit or vegetables.

- Henderson's Relish, a spicy and fruity condiment sauce made in Sheffield
- Gentleman's Relish, an anchovy paste

Relish may also refer to:

== People ==
- John Relish (born 1953), English football manager and former player
- Nickname of Arielle Gold, American world champion and Olympic bronze medalist snowboarder

== Books ==
- Relish (magazine), an American magazine, website, and cooking show

== Music ==
- Relish (album), an album by Joan Osborne
- Relish (band), a Northern Irish rock band

== Film ==
- Relish (film), a 2019 American film

== Other uses ==
- A common translation of the word "ὄψον" opson, the part of a meal not constituting the staple starch, in discussions of ancient Greek cuisine
