= Brock Bond =

American baseball player

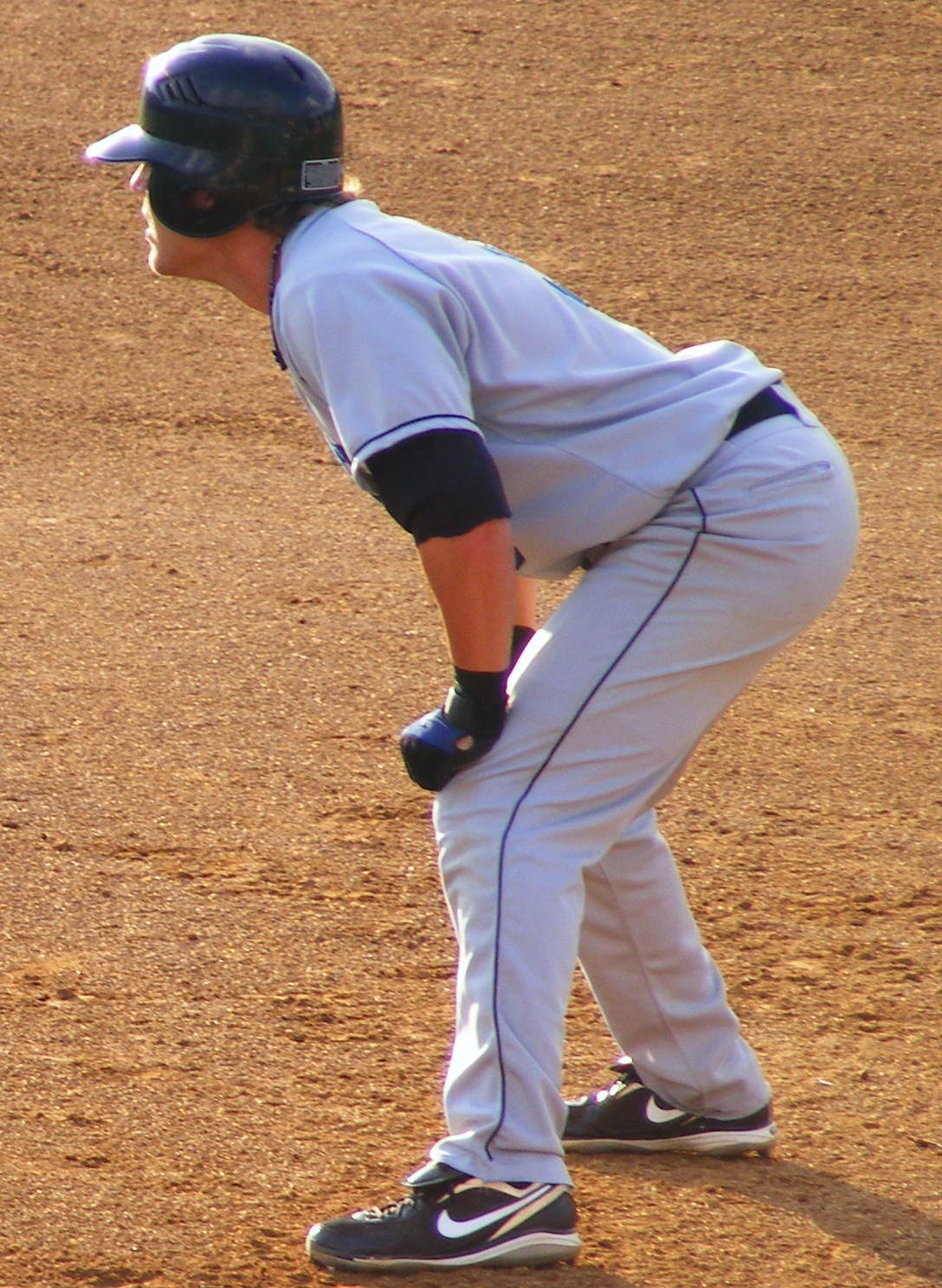
- Bond with the Connecticut Defenders in 2009
- Second baseman
- Born: September 11, 1985 (age 40); St. Louis, Missouri
- Bats: Both Throws: Right
- Stats at Baseball Reference

Brock Lee Bond (born September 11, 1985) is an American former professional baseball player. A Switch hitting second baseman, Bond played nine seasons in Minor League Baseball. Before playing professionally, Bond played college baseball at the University of Arkansas and the University of Missouri.

== Amateur career ==
Born and raised in St. Louis, Missouri, Bond attended Lindbergh High School, where he was a quarterback on the football team and infielder on the baseball team. Suburban Journals named Bond the Athlete of the Year in 2003.

Bond played Little League Baseball, where one of his teammates was Scott Van Slyke. Andy Van Slyke, Scott's father, told Bond that he could play in Major League Baseball.

After high school, Bond attended the University of Arkansas, where he played college baseball for the Arkansas Razorbacks baseball team. Bond transferred to the University of Missouri, where he played for the Missouri Tigers baseball team.

== Professional career ==
The San Francisco Giants drafted Bond in the 24th round of the 2007 MLB draft. The selection was a mistake, as the Giants meant to select Casey Bond. The Giants then selected Casey Bond in the 25th round. “Mistakenly, yes, Brock was taken first ahead of Casey,” Giants vice president Bobby Evans acknowledged. “But we planned to take both of them all along.” Bond signed with the Giants and began his professional career with the Arizona League Giants. He was then promoted to the Salem-Keizer Volcanoes of the Class A-Short Season Northwest League in which he led the team in hitting with a .342 batting average.

Bond began the 2008 season with the Augusta GreenJackets of the Class A South Atlantic League where he serves as a backup to Nick Noonan. On the suggestion of Steve Decker, manager of the San Jose Giants of the Class A-Advanced California League, the Giants promoted Bond to San Jose. He was promoted to Connecticut Defenders of the Class AA Eastern League in 2009. Bond was named to the mid-season and post-season all-star teams and led the league with a .333 batting average and a .429 on-base percentage. He was then promoted to the Fresno Grizzlies of the Class AAA Pacific Coast League (PCL) for the 2010 season, and was named to the PCL all-star game in Lehigh Valley. Bond was named the starting second baseman and was the first batter of the game.

Bond missed the majority of the 2011 season after suffering a concussion. He played in winter baseball in the Australian Baseball League in the 2011–12 off-season. Bond played for Fresno in 2012, he finished fifth in the PCL with a .332 batting average and third in the PCL with a .422 on-base percentage. The Giants invited Bond to Major League Spring Training in 2013, giving him an opportunity to compete for a roster spot in the majors for the Giants. The Giants sent him to their minor league complex in mid-March. At the end of spring training, Bond won the Harry S. Jordan Award, given to the player in his first spring training whose spirit best exemplifies the Giants. He suffered an oblique injury at the end of spring training and was assigned to San Jose to rehabilitate.

As Bond had been a member of the Giants' organization in minor league baseball for seven seasons, he became a free agent at the end of the 2013 season. The Baltimore Orioles signed him to a minor league contract for the 2014 season. The Winnipeg Goldeyes signed Bond. He had a batting average of .326 and an on base percentage of .448 for the Goldeyes. Bond began the 2015 season with the Arkansas Travelers of the Class AA Texas League, an affiliate of the Los Angeles Angels of Anaheim. He was released on May 31, but signed by the Colorado Rockies and assigned to the Albuquerque Isotopes of the PCL on June 1.

== Post-playing career ==
Bond learned Transcendental Meditation in 2014, while playing for the Baltimore Orioles. He enrolled at Maharishi University of Management in fall 2015, studying Vedic Science. He became a certified teacher of the Transcendental Meditation technique after completing a five and a half month TM teacher training course in Bali, Indonesia.

In 2019, Bond was a volunteer assistant coach at San Jose State under Brad Sanfilippo. The first base coach, Bond helped coach hitting and outfielders.

== Personal ==
Bond's father is a carpenter; he worked on Busch Memorial Stadium.

Bond's elder brother is in the United States Air Force, having graduated from the Air Force Academy. His younger brother, Brett Bond, played baseball at the University of Missouri.
