= Gotham Knights (TV series) =

2023 American superhero television series

- Genre: Action; Crime drama; Superhero
- Based on: Characters by: Bob Kane; Bill Finger
- Developed by: Natalie Abrams; Chad Fiveash; James Stoteraux
- Starring: Oscar Morgan; Olivia Rose Keegan; Navia Robinson; Fallon Smythe; Tyler DiChiara; Anna Lore; Rahart Adams; Misha Collins
- Music by: David Russo
- Country of origin: United States
- Original language: English
- No. of seasons: 1
- No. of episodes: 13

Production
- Executive producers: David Madden; Danny Cannon; Sarah Schechter; Chad Fiveash & James Stoteraux; Greg Berlanti; Leigh London-Redman
- Producers: Carl Ogawa; Jennifer Lence; Melissa Girotti; Elle Lipson; Suzanne C. Geiger
- Cinematography: James Hawkinson; Roger Chingirian; Rob C. Givens
- Editors: Mark C. Baldwin; Andrew Kasch; Leland Sexton; Monica Daniel
- Production companies: Berlanti Productions; DC Entertainment; Warner Bros. Television

Original release
- Network: The CW
- Release: March 14 – June 27, 2023

Gotham Knights is an American superhero television series developed by Natalie Abrams, Chad Fiveash, and James Stoteraux for The CW. It centers on members of the Batman family and other DC Comics supporting characters. It premiered on March 14, 2023. In June 2023, the series was canceled after one season, and aired its final episode on June 27, 2023.

== Premise ==
In the wake of Bruce Wayne's death, his adopted son Turner Hayes forges an unlikely alliance with runaways Harper and Cullen Row, and the criminal Duela, when they are all framed for the murder by the Gotham City Police Department and District Attorney Harvey Dent. The four youths attempt to clear their names and find out who really killed Bruce Wayne, with help from Turner's friend Stephanie Brown and Turner's classmate Carrie Kelley, who is secretly the superhero Robin.

The mystery of who framed them soon leads to the Court of Owls. Over time, they evolve into becoming Gotham City's new protectors known as the "Gotham Knights".

== Cast ==
=== Main ===
- Oscar Morgan as Turner Hayes, Bruce Wayne's adoptive son and a student at Gotham Academy who is alleged to have hired the three people framed for killing Bruce. Turner Hayes is an original character for the series and does not come from the comics.
- Olivia Rose Keegan as Duela, widely believed to be the daughter of the late Joker, who is among those framed for Bruce Wayne's murder. Elle Lisic portrays a younger Duela.
- Navia Robinson as Carrie Kelley / Robin, a student at Gotham Academy and the current sidekick of Batman who allies with Turner to find the true culprits of Batman's murder.
- Fallon Smythe as Harper Row, a young streetwise engineer and Cullen's sister who is among those framed for Bruce Wayne's murder.
- Tyler DiChiara as Cullen Row, Harper's brother who is among those framed for Bruce Wayne's murder.
- Anna Lore as Stephanie Brown, a student at Gotham Academy, Turner's best friend, and an expert coder. She allies with Turner to help find the true culprits of Batman's murder.
- Rahart Adams as Brody March, the son of Lincoln March and a fellow student at Gotham Academy.
- Misha Collins as Harvey Dent / Two-Face, an old friend of Bruce Wayne and Gotham City's district attorney.

=== Supporting ===
- K.K. Moggie as Cressida Clarke, Bruce Wayne's attaché who helped watch over Turner when he was younger, but who is secretly working for the Court of Owls
- Deja Dee as Commissioner Valerie Soto, a commissioner in the Gotham Police Department
- Lauren Stamile as Rebecca March, the mother of Brody March and the wife of Lincoln March
- Damon Dayoub as Lincoln March, the father of Brody March, the husband of Rebecca March, and a known industrialist
- Lazell Brown as Sgt. Apone, a sergeant in the Gotham Police Department
- Angela Davis as Dr. Kelley, Carrie's prominent doctor mother who is unaware of her daughter's secret activities until "Poison Pill"
- Grace Junot as Dr. Chase Meridian, a criminal psychiatrist who works with the Gotham Police Department. She is a friend and confidante to Gotham City District Attorney Harvey Dent.
- Sunny Mabrey as Crystal Brown, the mother of Stephanie Brown
- Ethan Embry as Arthur Brown, the father of Stephanie Brown and the host of the game show "Quiz Bowl"

=== Guest ===
- David Miller as Bruce Wayne / Batman (uncredited), the CEO of Wayne Enterprises, adoptive father of Turner, and vigilante who is found murdered.
- Joel Keller as Detective Ford, a detective of the Gotham City Police Department working for Harvey Dent who is among the police officers that tried to kill Turner and the suspects of Bruce Wayne's death.
- Fiona Byrne as Commissioner Yindel, a commissioner in the Gotham City Police Department
- Randall Newsome as Hamilton Hill, the Mayor of Gotham City who is in league with the Court of Owls. The Court of Owls kill him with a limousine rigged with a poison gas bomb after he served his purpose.
- Keil Oakley Zepernick as Vernon Wagner, the super-strong leader of the Mutants
- Veronica Cartwright as Eunice Harmon, an elderly lady and resident of a retirement home near Robinson Park who is the daughter of known serial killer Felix Harmon.
- Perris Drew as Titus Jones, the son of dead Wayne lawyer Pericles Jones who confronts Turner and Harper when they break and enter into his house.
- Doug Bradley as Joe Chill, a death row inmate who was incarcerated for murdering Thomas Wayne and Martha Wayne during a mugging
- Charlie Bodin as Mr. Hayes, the biological father of Turner who was murdered when Turner was young
- Emily Rose as Mrs. Hayes, the biological mother of Turner who was murdered when Turner was young
- Lindy Booth as Jane Doe, the mother of Duela, whose shocking information will irrevocably change Duela
- Charles Mesure as Henri Ducard, a man who had ties to Mr. and Mrs. Hayes before they were murdered

== Episodes ==
No.	Title	Directed by	Written by	Original release date	Prod. code	U.S. viewers (millions)
1	"Pilot"	Danny Cannon	Natalie Abrams; Chad Fiveash; James Stoteraux	March 14, 2023	T15.10160	0.61
In the wake of Bruce Wayne's death, his identity as Batman is also revealed. Joker's alleged daughter Duela Dent, siblings Harper and Cullen Row are arrested after an attempted break-in at Wayne Tower for stealing the gun that Joe Chill used to murder Thomas and Martha Wayne and become prime suspects in Wayne's murder. Bruce's adoptive son Turner Hayes, who did not know Bruce was Batman, and his best friend Stephanie Brown discover the Batcave after the funeral. Brown learns that money had been wired from Turner's account to the suspects and is arrested as well. Bruce's friend Harvey Dent tells Turner that Bruce's lawyers do not want to represent them as Dent receives pressure from Commissioner Yindel. With no other choice, Turner teams up with the suspects to break out and find the true murderer and clear their names. They receive aid from Carrie Kelley in her Robin alias after she saves them from Detective Ford and his fellow police officers who want them dead. While hiding in the Belfry at Gotham Academy, they also learn that the secret organization the Court of Owls is somehow involved when a mysterious masked operative kills Ford.
2	"Scene of the Crime"	Jeffrey Hunt	Chad Fiveash & James Stoteraux	March 21, 2023	T43.10202	0.43
As Turner and his allies stock up on necessities, Turner and his allies prepare for their next move as Mayor Hamilton Hill form a task force led by Harvey Dent to clear out the Batcave beneath Wayne Manor. Detective Ford and his team's severed heads are delivered to the police department. Turner suggests returning to the crime scene with Robin, Harper, and Cullen to clear their names. They go to Wayne Tower to retrieve Bruce's journals but encounter a Talon. Duela tries to sell a watch to an antique dealer but is attacked by another Talon. Turner, Robin, Harper, and Cullen escape, and Duela is rescued. They realize the latest journal entries are missing. Turner's attaché Cressida and Hill are revealed to be associated with the Court of Owls. Brody takes the blame for hacking to help prove Turner's innocence, and Robin begins deciphering Bruce's final preparations.
3	"Under Pressure"	Lauren Petzke	Natalie Abrams	March 28, 2023	T43.10203	0.48
Robin takes down Mutants leader Vernon Wagner with an improvised taser and leaves him for the police, credited by Mayor Hamilton Hill. Stephanie encounters Brody, who's been cleared of charges and is forced to attend the Founders Gala with his parents Lincoln March and Rebecca Marsh. Cullen poses as a cop to access files on Alan Wayne's murder, while Turner saves Robin from a Mutant at a warehouse. Mutants possess a gas bomb from a raid on Ace Chemicals. At the Gala, Stephanie meets Brody's parents, Hill, and Harvey Dent. Mutants attack, taking hostages and demanding Wagner's release. Turner, Duela, Harper, and Robin fight them. Hill surrenders to their demands. Stephanie disarms the bomb, upsetting Harper. Mutant members are arrested, but Wagner escapes. Files reveal Court of Owls involvement. Dent announces mayoral candidacy, and Hill is killed by the Court of Owls' poison gas-rigged limousine.
4	"Of Butchers and Betrayals"	Geoffrey Wing Shotz	David Paul Francis & Devon Balsamo-Gillis	April 4, 2023	T43.10204	0.47
In the park, Pericles Jones claims to hear voices and takes his own life. Meanwhile, Lincoln March enters the mayoral race against Harvey Dent following Hamilton Hill's death. Commissioner Sato investigates the case, finding that Pericles had wounds similar to Talon victims. Cullen poses as a police officer to help Stephanie access the police database and has an encounter with Harvey. Turner and Harper visit Pericles' house, where they meet his son Titus, who mentions Pericles' strange behavior and connections to the Court of Owls. Carrie and Duela investigate Felix Harmon, a serial killer, and find a connection to the Court of Owls through Harmon's daughter Eunice. Turner goes to Wayne Manor and confronts Cressida, who reveals her involvement in poisoning Bruce Wayne and offers to help him. Robin intervenes when Court of Owls members arrive, and they escape, collapsing part of the Batcave on the Talon. Harvey discovers a key that unlocks Hill's limo. Duela steals Eunice's music box and finds Felix Harmon's fingerprints on it, suggesting he may have been the Talon. The Court of Owls' broken Talon mysteriously heals and reassembles itself.
5	"More Money, More Problems"	Nimisha Mukerji	Elle Lipson & Summer Plair	April 11, 2023	T43.10205	0.38
A mob called the McKillens burns down a bar for not paying protection money. Carrie's mother may miss the Parents' Luncheon due to work. Stephanie reveals the Court's use of shell companies for hiding money. The team infiltrates a McKillen stronghold to steal a ledger. Harvey talks to Dr. Chase Meridian about his fears. They find the ledger and money but are confronted by Dylan. Turner subdues him, and they escape with a van, tossing money on the street. Harvey hears strange music during a call. The media dubs them "Gotham Knights." Carrie narrowly avoids her mother. Harper and Cullen discuss the mob's money used for his surgery. Duela appreciates Turner's rule-breaking. Harvey wakes up with Lincoln March's wife, confused about the call.
6	"A Chill in Gotham"	Alexandra La Roche	Nicki Holcomb & Nate Gualtieri	April 25, 2023	T43.10206	0.43
The most famous criminal in Gotham, Joe Chill, is about to be executed and calls Harvey Dent. He wants to talk to Turner and offers information about the Court. Stephanie goes to her father for help with the ledger but only receives cryptic words. Aided by Stephanie, Harvey organizes a meeting and Turner reluctantly agrees. Meanwhile, Stephanie, Harper, Cullen and Duela work together to crack the code of the ledger. Following a clue from Stephanie's father Arthur Brown, they use a book cypher. Turner learns from Joe Chill that he too was framed for the murder of Bruce's parents. Chill wants to give more information, but the governor intervenes and the execution begins. Chill starts to quote a part of the nursing rhyme "that watches all the time". After figuring out the ledger, the Knights find the location of opioid dealers and take them out. Stephanie almost gets shot but Harper saves her. Harvey tries to warn Lincoln March, but the Talon stabs him. Turner comforts Stephanie. She then leaves for the hospital where Brody and Carrie are volunteering. Mrs. Kelley says to Brody that his father is out of danger.
7	"Bad to Be Good"	Avi Youabian	Alegre Rodriquez & Michelle Furtney-Goodman	May 2, 2023	T43.10207	0.33
An art thief steals paintings in Gotham, so the GCPD brings in an expert named Detective Green. The Gotham Knights take an interest once they realize the paintings once belonged to Allan Wayne. Meanwhile, Duela kidnaps Eunice Harmon in order to gain information about the Talon. Duela and Carrie interrogate her and she tells them about a substance which kept her father alive but she does not know what it is. This leads to Eunice almost killing Duela and stabbing her hand. Harvey helps Rebecca and they rekindle their romance. Turner, Stephanie, Harper, and Cullen catch the art thief who turns out to be Detective Green. The Court blackmailed her with her family to steal the paintings. Because of her injury, Cullen and Turner take the painting instead. They exchange Green's family for Eunice. Stephanie bandages Harper's wound. Duela and Carrie find pictures of the Court within the music box. Cressida seeks help from Harvey because the Court is planning something that could impact the entirety of Gotham. The Court members burn the paintings in order to reveal what is hidden underneath.
8	"Belly of the Beast"	Jeffrey Hunt	David Paul Francis & Nate Gualtieri	May 9, 2023	T43.10208	0.35
The Gotham Knights use a ledger to disrupt criminal operations but struggle to take down the Court of Owls. They discover a secret party's location, aiming to find a substance called Electrum for immortality. Turner and Duela infiltrate the party, taking a map, but Turner helps Cressida, who is nearly killed. They escape with her, but Turner goes missing. Stephanie finds her alcoholic mother at home and faces her father's anger. Harvey worries about Lincoln March knowing about his affair and searches for Cressida. She disappears, leaving behind a recorder playing the music again. Cressida explains her plan to Turner, wanting to oppose the Court. The leader kills Cressida and captures Turner. Carrie, Harper, and Cullen convince Duela to regroup. The Court's leader is revealed as Lincoln March. Harvey wakes up with an owl mask and blood on his hand.
9	"Dark Knight of the Soul"	Eric Dean Seaton	Elle Lipson & Devon Balsamo-Gillis	May 23, 2023	T43.10209	0.33
The Knights try to find a way to get Turner back and discover a possible location of Electrum which they want to use for negotiation. The first site is wrong but they find another hidden clue in another one of Alan Wayne's paintings and ultimately the Electrum. Harvey makes a video journal describing his black-outs and proclaiming his innocence. Meanwhile, Turner is put under hallucinations due to the poison on the Talon's knife. He imagines meeting his parents who accuse him of forgetting them and that he never tried to find their murderer. Lincoln March reveals to him that Batman was responsible for their deaths. Stephanie and Harper find out the Court is hiding out at Wayne Manor. Duela and Carrie argue whether the Court should have the Electrum. Cullen makes a duplicate. Turner refuses to join the Court and Duela and Cullen burst in. Lincoln slashes Turners' throat, so Carrie saves him using the real Electrum which she gives to Lincoln. They head back to the Belfry. Cullen comforts Carrie about giving away the electrum. Turner breaks down causing Duela to scream for help. Meanwhile, Harvey watches as his alternate personality talks to him from a recording.
10	"Poison Pill"	Elizabeth Henstridge	Nicki Holcomb & Summer Plair	May 30, 2023	T43.10210	0.39
Turner has radioactive poisoning due to direct contact of the Electrum with his blood. Carrie reveals that she took the missing pages of Batman's diary and she knew that he was in some way responsible for the death of Turner's parents. Turner angrily sends her away. Stephanie meets Brody and tells him the truth after he found his father's mask and a video of Cressida's murder. Meanwhile, Harvey takes sleeping pills in order to talk with his alternate self in a dream. His alternate personality reveals that the Court wants to frame him and triggers the switch with a recording of piano music. The other Harvey also states that he killed their father. They fight over dominance and Harvey wins as he wakes up. He is later visited by Chase Meridian. Carrie smuggles Turner into the hospital and her mother saves him with a blood transfusion. This causes Carrie to come clean about her secret life as Robin. Turner and Duela have sex for the first time. Brody tells the truth to his mother and she kills him, revealing herself to be the true leader of the Court of Owls. Lincoln resurrects Brody with Electrum as he awakens in a casket.
11	"Daddy Issues"	America Young	Natalie Abrams & Caroline Dries	June 6, 2023	T43.10211	0.36
A worried Cullen visits Carrie and learns the truth about the missing pages of Bruce's diary. Stephanie wants to tell the police everything, but Lincoln March blackmails her by having her father arrested for buying prescriptions drugs from a doctor. Stephanie refuses to help her father because that would mean losing her friends and enabling her mother's addiction. Meanwhile, Turner and Duela meet Duela's mother Jane Doe who drugs him for the reward money, without Duela's knowledge. Turner regretfully says he cannot leave Gotham with them, and Duela is hurt. Jane captures Harvey and claims they had an affair which resulted in Duela, and then Harvey had Jane committed to Arkham. Jane tells Duela she arranged with the Joker to pretend he was her father so she would be protected, and he only abandoned her after she was able to look out for herself. Stephanie and Harper save Turner by tricking the police into having Cullen pick him up under the alias of Officer Hines. Realizing his alter ego caused this, Harvey tries to convince them. Under Jane's influence, Duela shoots him. Turner reconciles with Cullen while Stephanie moves into the Belfry and kisses Harper. Harvey survived thanks to the coin, but the truth about Duela's parentage was leaked to sabotage his campaign--the Court was behind Jane's release from Arkham.
12	"City of Owls"	Ben Hernandez Bray	Brooke Pohl & Amy Do Thurlow	June 20, 2023	T43.10212	0.28
Lincoln is sworn in as the new Mayor of Gotham and has Harvey fired. Stephanie and Harper sneak into his penthouse and recover the footage of Cressida's murder, but are forced to hide on the hidden thirteenth floor where they find and free Brody who mentions his mother's involvement and finds himself reviving after taking a hit from the attackers. Turner suspects that Wayne Tower had a similar hidden floor where the Talon was waiting to murder Bruce and a disguised Cullen tells Harvey to investigate. Brody tells the Knights about an upcoming Court gathering. They arrive there and find Lincoln and the Court members murdered by Rebecca and her newly resurrected Talons. The GCPD then arrest the Knights. Rebecca confronts Harvey, who discovered her true identity as Dr. Rebekah Leviticus, the Court scientist who experimented on Electrum to live for a century. Though she claims to genuinely love him, he rejects her, so Rebecca has him taken away. Meanwhile, Duela initially considers running away with her mother after swiping some specific watches, but decides to rescue her friends only for Jane to sedate her. Rebecca then dispatches her Talons to kill the Knights.
13	"Night of the Owls"	Jeffrey Hunt	Teleplay by : Chad Fiveash & James Stoteraux; Story by : Alegre Rodriquez & Michelle Furtney-Goodman	June 27, 2023	T43.10213	0.33
While the police interrogate the Knights, Rebecca takes Duela hostage to force Harvey's other side out. Turner learns from Commissioner Soto that Batman was acting in self-defense when he caused the death of his parents, who were assassins dispatched by Henri Ducard. The Talons arrive to kill the Knights, but Soto frees them and they fight back, but Carrie's mother gets hurt. Duela contacts the others over the phone connected to the bomb, which reveals Rebecca's plan to destroy all the buildings designed by Alan Wayne and cover her tracks. Duela bonds with Harvey and he lets his other self out who tries to kill Rebecca and gets burned with acid. The Knights agree to mount a rescue effort. Meanwhile, Duela refuses to cooperate with Rebecca's plan to frame her. Brody overdoses his mother with Electrum to prevent her from killing Turner. Duela is deeply moved by Turner coming for her and they kiss. Wanting to find his father's journals, Turner goes back for them. Before Turner can get out, Rebecca wounds him as the Talons close in. Before the building explodes, French mercenaries arrive, shoot Rebecca and her Talons with advanced weaponry, and take Turner away. Harvey kills Jane. Turner meets Ducard, who says he trained not only his parents but Bruce Wayne. He plans to train Turner, whose life in Gotham he says is over, now that everyone there believes he is dead. Turner seems unconvinced.

== Production ==
=== Development ===
In December 2021, it was reported that a television series adaptation was in development at The CW. The series was written by Natalie Abrams, James Stoteraux, and Chad Fiveash, all of whom also served as executive producers with Greg Berlanti, Sarah Schechter, and David Madden through Berlanti Productions. The video game of the same title also takes place in a post-Bruce Wayne Gotham and also features the Court of Owls as antagonists, but the projects are unrelated. In February 2022, The CW ordered a pilot episode to evaluate. When designing the costumes for the pilot, costume designer Jennifer May Nickel, worked with writers Stoteraux and Fiveash, to incorporate aspects of the uniform from the Gotham Academy comic books. In May 2022, The CW picked up Gotham Knights to series.

In May 2023, Brad Schwartz, President of Entertainment at The CW, stated that Gotham Knights was among series that were not profitable directly for The CW and was more expensive than series imported for The CW such as Sullivan's Crossing. On June 12, 2023, The CW canceled the series after one season. Showrunners Chad Fiveash and James Stoteraux stated on June 14 that Warner Bros. Discovery and Berlanti Productions had tried to find another outlet to pick up the series for months before the cancellation, but had been unsuccessful.

=== Casting ===
In March 2022, Fallon Smythe and Tyler DiChiara were cast for the pilot, followed by Oscar Morgan, Olivia Rose Keegan, and Navia Robinson shortly afterward. Misha Collins revealed that he would portray Harvey Dent. Anna Lore also joined the cast, portraying Stephanie Brown. In April, Rahart Adams was cast as Brody, whose parents were cast in recurring roles for Lauren Stamile and Damon Dayoub after the pilot was picked up to series. In January 2023, Ethan Embry and Sunny Mabrey were cast in recurring capacities as Cluemaster and Crystal Brown. In March 2023, Doug Bradley joined the cast in a recurring role as Joe Chill, with Bradley indicating that he was a fan of Batman but was unaware of who Joe Chill was in the Batman mythology. Storeaux and Fiveash originally intended to depict Bruce Wayne / Batman onscreen in a flashback scene adapting the panel of The Dark Knight Returns where Carrie Kelley presents herself to Batman, for which they wished to have Kevin Conroy, who voiced Batman in several animated media since Batman: The Animated Series in 1992, play the role in live-action as he did in the Arrowverse crossover "Crisis on Infinite Earths", but Conroy was already too sick to play the part prior to his death in late 2022. Collins tried to convince Jensen Ackles, who voiced Batman in the Tomorrowverse continuity of DC Universe Animated Original Movies, to reprise the role, but ultimately nothing materialized with the showrunners resorting to use a photo double in spite of DC's love for the idea.

=== Filming ===
Filming for the pilot episode began in April 2022 throughout Toronto, Ontario. Filming for the rest of the season began in Atlanta, Georgia on September 13, 2022.

== Release ==
The first trailer was released on May 31, 2022. The series premiered on March 14, 2023 and the series finale aired on June 27, 2023. It was released on the Max streaming service on July 28, 2023.

== Reception ==
=== Critical response ===
The series has been panned by critics. On review aggregator Rotten Tomatoes, the series has an approval rating of 25% with an average rating of 5/10, based on 12 critic reviews. The website's critics consensus reads, "Never send amateurs to do a Batman's job." On Metacritic, it has a weighted average score of 42 out of 100 based on 4 critic reviews, indicating "mixed or average reviews".

=== Ratings ===
Viewership and ratings per episode of Gotham Knights
No.	Title	Air date	Rating (18–49)	Viewers (millions)
1	"Pilot"	March 14, 2023	0.1	0.61
2	"Scene of the Crime"	March 21, 2023	0.1	0.43
3	"Under Pressure"	March 28, 2023	0.1	0.48
4	"Of Butchers and Betrayals"	April 4, 2023	0.1	0.47
5	"More Money, More Problems"	April 11, 2023	0.1	0.38
6	"A Chill in Gotham"	April 25, 2023	0.1	0.43
7	"Bad to Be Good"	May 2, 2023	0.1	0.33
8	"Belly of the Beast"	May 9, 2023	0.1	0.35
9	"Dark Knight of the Soul"	May 23, 2023	0.1	0.33
10	"Poison Pill"	May 30, 2023	0.1	0.39
11	"Daddy Issues"	June 6, 2023	0.0	0.36
12	"City of Owls"	June 20, 2023	0.0	0.28
13	"Night of the Owls"	June 27, 2023	0.0	0.33
