= Tyler DiChiara =

American actor

Tyler A. DiChiara (born February 9, 2000) is an American actor. He is known for portraying Cullen Row in The CW television series Gotham Knights (2023). He is also known for playing Kai in the 2019 feature film Relish. He also appeared in the 2022 film The Virgin of Highland Park.

== Personal life ==
DiChiara has a background in martial arts.

DiChiara has said in a 2023 interview with Digital Spy, "I might be a transgender man, but I thought I was bisexual for a long time. Then I actually came out just recently as gay."

DiChiara is from Staten Island.

== Filmography ==
=== Film ===
Year	Title	Role	Notes
2019	Relish	Kai	
2022	The Virgin of Highland Park	Jordan	
2022	Our Language Is Chaos	Ziv	Short film
2023	The Furry Fortune	Delivery Man	

=== Television ===
Year	Title	Role	Notes
2023	Gotham Knights	Cullen Row	13 episodes
