= Navia Robinson =

American actress (born 2005)

- Born: Navia Ziraili Robinson; May 4, 2005 (age 21); Marietta, Georgia, U.S.
- Occupation: Actress
- Years active: 2014–present
- Television: Being Mary Jane; Free Rein; Raven's Home; Gotham Knights

Navia Ziraili Robinson (born May 4, 2005) is an American actress. She made her acting debut in a recurring role on BET's Being Mary Jane, before being cast in a starring role in Netflix's Free Rein. Whilst appearing in the first two seasons of Free Rein, Robinson was also starring in Disney Channel's Raven's Home as Nia Baxter-Carter, a role she portrayed for the show's first four seasons. In 2023, she starred in Gotham Knights on the CW.

== Life and career ==
Navia Ziraili Robinson was born on May 4, 2005, in Marietta, Georgia. In 2014, she made her acting debut in a recurring role on the BET drama series Being Mary Jane. She portrayed D'Asia, the niece of the titular character, from until 2015. After her role on the series, she was handpicked by rapper Nicki Minaj to star in her television pilot titled Nicki about her life growing up in Queens. However, the project was not picked up for series.

In 2017, Robinson appeared in an episode of The Vampire Diaries. Later that year, she was cast in two starring television roles: Rosie Phillips in the Netflix series Free Rein and Nia Baxter-Carter in the Disney Channel series Raven's Home. Robinson starred in the first two seasons of Free Rein, before exiting the series to solely appear in Raven's Home. She then remained in Raven's Home until 2021. Whilst on Raven's Home, she appeared in a crossover episode with fellow Disney Channel series Bunk'd. She also voiced Valerie D'Avion for The Rocketeer, which aired on sister channel Disney Junior. Then in 2023, she starred in the first and only season of the CW superhero series Gotham Knights.

== Filmography ==
| Year | Title | Role | Notes |
|---|---|---|---|
| 2014–2015 | Being Mary Jane | D'Asia | Recurring role |
| 2017 | The Vampire Diaries | Janie | Episode: "What Are You?" |
| 2017–2018 | Free Rein | Rosie Phillips | Main role (seasons 1–2) |
| 2017–2021 | Raven's Home | Nia Baxter-Carter | Main role (seasons 1–4) |
| 2019 | Marvel Rising: Initiation | Zayla (voice) | Episode: "Playing with Fire" |
| 2019–2020 | The Rocketeer | Valerie D'Avion (voice) | Recurring role |
| 2020 | Bunk'd | Nia Baxter-Carter | Episode: "Raven About Bunk'd: Part Two" |
| 2021 | The Edge | Charlotte Facilier | Film |
| 2022 | We Are Gathered Here Today | Debbie Spitz | Film |
| 2023 | Gotham Knights | Carrie Kelley | Main role |
| 2025 | All There Is | Makayla | Film |
