= Hostages (American TV series) =

American drama television series

- Genre: Drama; Suspense
- Based on: Bnei Aruba by Omri Givon; Rotem Shamir
- Developed by: Alon Aranya; Jeffrey Nachmanoff
- Starring: Toni Collette; Dylan McDermott; Tate Donovan; Quinn Shephard; Mateus Ward; Billy Brown; Sandrine Holt; Rhys Coiro; James Naughton
- Composers: Jeff Russo; Ben Decter
- Country of origin: United States
- Original language: English
- No. of seasons: 1
- No. of episodes: 15

Production
- Executive producers: Omri Givon; Rotem Shamir; Chaim Sharir; Jeffrey Nachmanoff; Rick Eid; Jonathan Littman; Jerry Bruckheimer
- Producer: Scott White
- Running time: 40-43 minutes
- Production companies: Jerry Bruckheimer Television; Channel 10; Warner Bros. Television

Original release
- Network: CBS
- Release: September 23, 2013 – January 6, 2014

Related
- Hostages

Hostages is an American drama television series that aired on CBS as part of the 2013–14 American television season. Developed for American television by Alon Aranya and Jeffrey Nachmanoff, it is based on the Israeli series of the same name created by Omri Givon and Rotem Shamir and produced by Chaim Sharir, which premiered on October 13, 2013, almost three weeks after the American version's premiere. Jeffrey Nachmanoff wrote and directed the pilot episode for the American version.

The series premiered on September 23, 2013 and ended on January 6, 2014. On May 10, 2014, CBS cancelled the series after one season.

== Plot ==
The family of a doctor is taken hostage by a team led by a rogue FBI agent the night before she is scheduled to perform surgery on the President of the United States. She is ordered by the kidnappers to assassinate the President during surgery in order to save her family.

== Cast ==
=== Main ===
- Toni Collette as Dr. Ellen Sanders, a well respected thoracic surgeon at the Maryland College Hospital in Washington who is chosen to operate on the President of the United States.
- Dylan McDermott as FBI Special Agent Duncan Carlisle, leader of the team that takes the Sanders family hostage. His motivation is to help his sick wife Nina, who has leukemia.
- Tate Donovan as Brian Sanders, husband of Ellen Sanders and the owner of a real estate firm in Washington. He is having an affair with his assistant, Samantha.
- Quinn Shephard as Morgan Sanders, teenage daughter of Ellen and Brian Sanders. Secretly she has gotten pregnant by her boyfriend, but initially doesn't reveal it to her parents.
- Mateus Ward as Jake Sanders, teenage son of Ellen and Brian Sanders, and younger than Morgan.
- Billy Brown as Archer Petit, a member of the team that takes the Sanders family hostage. He and Duncan met 13 years ago after he was rescued from FARC guerrillas while working at the Colombian border.
- Sandrine Holt as Sandrine Renault, a member of the team that takes the Sanders family hostage. She and Archer met while in Afghanistan.
- Rhys Coiro as Kramer Delaney, a member of the team that takes the Sanders family hostage and Duncan's brother-in-law.
- James Naughton as President Paul Kincaid.

=== Recurring ===
- Hilarie Burton as Samantha, mistress and assistant of Brian Sanders
- Paul Calderon as Secret Service Agent Stan Hoffman, a hardworking family man assigned to the joint FBI–Secret Service task force tasked with investigating the threat on the President's life.
- Jim True-Frost as Secret Service Agent Logan.
- Brian White as Colonel Thomas Blair, Marine and current NSA director.
- Joanne Kelly as Vanessa Moore, sister of Mary Kincaid.
- Jeremy Bobb as Quentin Creasy, Chief of Staff within the Kincaid administration.
- Lola Cook as Sawyer Carlisle, Duncan's daughter.
- Larry Pine as Burton Delaney, Duncan's father-in-law and Paul Kincaid's adviser when he was a senator.
- Tyler Elliott Burke as Boyd Norton, Morgan's boyfriend.
- Mary Elizabeth Mastrantonio as First Lady Mary Kincaid, wife of President Paul Kincaid.
- Francie Swift as Nina Carlisle, Duncan's sick wife.

== Filming locations ==
A list of filming locations:

- In New York
  - Carle Place
    - Carle Place High School
  - Uniondale
    - RexCorp Plaza
    - Charles Lindbergh Boulevard
  - Hicksville
    - Hicksville Train Station
  - East Meadow
    - Eisenhower Park
  - Long Island City
  - Brooklyn (Greenpoint / Brooklyn Heights)
  - White Plains
    - Westchester County Airport

== International broadcasts ==
Hostages is broadcast internationally: in the UK on Sky and Channel 4, Australia on Nine Network, in Canada on CTV, in Latin America on Warner Channel, in the Netherlands on NET 5, in New Zealand on TV One, in Finland on MTV3, in South Africa on M-Net, in India on Zee Café, in France on Canal+, in Portugal on RTP2, in Austria on ORF 1, in Belgium on één in Spain on Antena 3 and in Slovenia on POP TV .

== Episodes ==
No.	Title	Directed by	Written by	Original release date	Prod. code	U.S. viewers (millions)
1	"Pilot"	Jeffrey Nachmanoff	Teleplay by : Alon Aranya and Jeffrey Nachmanoff	September 23, 2013	276062	7.41
Dr. Ellen Sanders and her family are taken hostage by a rogue FBI agent who threats to kill them if she does not kill the President in an upcoming surgery she will be performing on him.
2	"Invisible Leash"	Jason Ensler	Rick Eid & Jeffrey Nachmanoff	September 30, 2013	4X5152	5.96
After Ellen's disobedience, Duncan threats to kill one of her loved ones. He also tells the family to go back to living their normal lives for two weeks, but warns them that his team will be following them all the time.
3	"Power of Persuasion"	Henry Bronchtein	Rick Eid & Jeffrey Nachmanoff	October 7, 2013	4X5153	5.22
When the President decides to use another doctor for his surgery, Ellen is threatened by Duncan to make him change his mind. Also, Ellen meets Duncan's daughter which could help her get more insight into him.
4	"2:45 PM"	Russell Lee Fine	Aron Eli Coleite	October 14, 2013	4X5154	5.16
Ellen and Brian work on a plan to escape with their kids. Meanwhile, Duncan's wife makes a difficult decision.
5	"Truth and Consequences"	Karen Gaviola	Jennifer Cecil	October 21, 2013	4X5155	5.16
Ellen puts her skills to work when there is an emergency in the house. An innocent becomes a victim and Duncan wants answers.
6	"Sister's Keeper"	David Von Ancken	Jennifer Schuur	October 28, 2013	4X5156	4.90
Ellen's sister Lauren unexpectedly arrives at the house and decides to stays while unaware of the current situation. Agent Hoffman in his investigation of the disappearance of Nurse Angela discovers Archer's involvement and confronts Duncan about his lies. Meanwhile Kramer discovers a way that can get Sandrine the money that she needs with dire consequences by robbing a high-stakes poker game. Morgan visits an OBGYN in a routine pregnancy checkup.
7	"Hail Mary"	Matt Earl Beesley	Rick Eid & Alon Aranya	November 4, 2013	4X5157	4.79
Duncan gets Archer sent to prison in order to silence the accomplice that helped him dispose of Nurse Angela's body because she cut a deal with the ADA. Ellen decides to go to Burton Delaney, the lawyer who represented her in a case when she was a resident, in the hope that he can have Duncan eliminated permanently. Meanwhile, Kramer finds out that the limousine driver he assaulted died in hospital, and Brian spends the day searching for a way to have Duncan killed.
8	"The Good Reason"	SJ Clarkson	Cassie Pappas	November 11, 2013	4X5158	4.53
After finding out from Burton that the organization will have Ellen and her family killed if Duncan dies, she rushes home to find out that Brian has injected Duncan with the poison she was given to kill the president. In the process of trying to find out Duncan's motives for killing the president, she tries to gain insight to his life through his sick wife, Nina. Meanwhile, Kramer gets questioned for his involvement in the death of the limousine driver and Agent Hoffman questions Brian.
9	"Loose Ends"	Henry Bronchtein	Rick Eid & Jeffrey Nachmanoff	November 18, 2013	4X5159	4.54
Agent Hoffman's investigation further deepens when he discovers that a high ranking official within the White House forged documents in order to have the president choose Maryland College Hospital for his operation. Logan reveals to Duncan that Hoffman must be killed and his team devises a plan to prevent this from occurring. Meanwhile, the president decides that he will release information related to NSA initiative "Operation Total Information," which targeted citizens' privacy.
10	"Burden of Truth"	Phil Abraham	Joshua Allen	November 25, 2013	4X5160	5.62
Ellen gains further insight into Nina's past through Duncan and investigates the alternative possibility of saving Nina's life without having to kill the president. In the process, she discovers that Nina's mother did not die during childbirth. Meanwhile, Duncan and his team continue to work against the organization trying to have the president killed and finds out that they hired a sniper to have him assassinated during his visit to New York.
11	"Off the Record"	Duane Clark	Nick Santora	December 2, 2013	4X5161	4.51
The Sanders family is locked up while Duncan's team travels to New York to stop the sniper that is targeting the President.
12	"The Cost of Living"	Frederick E. O. Toye	Rick Eid & Jeffrey Nachmanoff	December 9, 2013	4X5162	4.69
Brian goes to the police to expose Duncan's plot. However, he reconsiders when Burton shows him a picture of Ellen kissing Duncan.
13	"Fight or Flight"	Bill Johnson	Rick Eid & Jeffrey Nachmanoff	December 16, 2013	4X5163	5.09
After Nina learns of Duncan's actions through Brian, Ellen makes clear that she will not kill the president. They devise a plan that will allow each of them to get what they want. Meanwhile, Archer discovers that Sandrine is working for the other side and Nina escapes from Burton's house, only to be found by Blair.
14	"Suspicious Minds"	Anton Cropper	Rick Eid	January 6, 2014	4X5164	5.07
Duncan discovers that Sandrine has been involved in a plot to kill his team. Instead of eliminating Sandrine, he uses her to free his wife and daughter, who have been taken hostage by Blair.
15	"Endgame"	Jeffrey Nachmanoff	Jeffrey Nachmanoff	January 6, 2014	4X5165	4.69
Ellen is to finally operate on President Kincaid. Duncan and Archer devise a plot to kill Sandrine after they learn about her and Logan's plot to kill them and Kramer. Blair kidnaps Nina and Sawyer. Duncan is determined to get them back. Blair reassures Duncan he will have them back after Kincaid is dead. Archer thinks Duncan is acting suspiciously. Meanwhile, Ellen and Brian talk over what will happen. Brian and Morgan flee the house. They are later followed by a mysterious man, who tries to kill Morgan, but whom Brian shoots dead. Ellen sets a smoke bomb to cause a distraction while operating on the president. Archer tracks down Jake, who is in safety at a cabin. When Brian and Morgan arrive, they find Jake with Archer. Archer takes Brian, Morgan, and Jake hostage, and then takes them to an abandoned warehouse. Shortly before the surgery, the president's wife confronts Ellen about why she needed the president's bone marrow. Instead of Ellen confessing that she had been held hostage, she tells her about Nina's illness. Ellen operates on the president, who begins to lose a large amount of blood when the smoke bomb goes off. They believe it is an attack. Ellen does not kill the president; he survives. Duncan and Vanessa meet up hours before the surgery, and Vanessa confesses her worries about Blair. Vanessa leads Blair into a trap, where Duncan threatens to kill him unless he releases Nina and Sawyer. Blair does, but attacks Sandrine, who is with them. After that, Duncan kills him. Kramer picks up Nina and Sawyer, and returns them to safety after the president's successful surgery. Nina expresses her worries about Sawyer growing up with a murderer as a father. Duncan promises to make it better and tells Sawyer he will not be back for a long time. Vanessa and Mary talk to Kincaid after he wakes up, and he is recovering. He claims he is happy to be alive, but Mary tells him he will not be for long. Vanessa and Mary say they know everything about Nina and her mother. Kincaid looks shocked. At the end, Duncan is at a police station with Burton. Burton wants to go in with Duncan, but Duncan says he needs to look after Nina and Sawyer. Duncan then turns himself in.

== Reception ==
The review aggregator website Rotten Tomatoes reported a 56% approval rating based on 43 reviews, with an average rating of 6/10. The website's critics consensus reads, "Hostages has an intriguing premise and handsome production values, but its twisty plot sometimes strains credulity."

David Hinckley of the New York Daily News gave the show 4 out of 5 stars. Robert Bianco of USA Today awarded it 3 out of 4 stars.

=== Accolades ===
Year	Association	Category	Nominee	Result	Ref.
2014	People's Choice Awards	Favorite New Television Drama	Hostages	Nominated	
