= Hamilton Hill (character) =

Publication information
- Publisher: DC Comics
- First appearance: Detective Comics #503 (June 1981)
- Created by: Gerry Conway (writer); Don Newton (artist)

In-story information
- Species: Human

Hamilton Hill is a character appearing in American comic books published by DC Comics. He is the former Mayor of Gotham City and an adversary of Batman.

== Publication history ==
Hamilton Hill first appeared in Detective Comics #503 (June 1981) and was created by Gerry Conway and Don Newton.

== Fictional character biography ==
Hamilton Hill is originally presented as a corrupt politician running against city councilman Arthur Reeves in Gotham City's mayoral election. Hill defeats Reeves and becomes mayor of Gotham after the councilman's photos purporting to reveal Batman's identity turn out to be faked. Unbeknownst to the citizens, Hill is in league with crime lord Rupert Thorne, who helped him become mayor in exchange for Hill granting him favors.

During his time in office, he assists Thorne's attempts to identify and defeat Batman. He also hires an assassin to take out police detective Harvey Bullock, who confronts Hill and is shot. Bullock survives, with Hill covering up the events to preserve his public image.

Hill later fires police commissioner James Gordon and replaces him with Peter Pauling, one of Thorne's minions. After Thorne is brought down and Pauling murdered, Hill re-instates Gordon, but spends the rest of his tenure as Mayor trying to shift the blame for Gotham's problems onto Gordon's shoulders.

Hill attempts to get rid of Batman by accusing him of the Nightslayer's crimes. Batman defeats Nightslayer and exposes Hill's plot, leading to him being removed from office.

In 2016, DC Comics implemented a relaunch called DC Rebirth, restoring its continuity to a form much as it was before The New 52. Hill is revealed to have a son named Hamilton Hill Jr., who is Gotham's deputy mayor.

== In other media ==
=== Television ===
- Hamilton Hill appears in series set in the DC Animated Universe (DCAU), voiced by Lloyd Bochner. This version is a strict but honest man determined to make Gotham a safer city, to the point where he initially considers Batman equally as dangerous as the criminals he faces until Batman rescues his son Jordan from the Joker. Additionally, Hill unintentionally contributed to Temple Fugate's transformation into the Clock King years prior.
- Hamilton Hill appears in The Batman two-part episode "The Batman/Superman Story", voiced by Lex Lang. This version is African-American and became mayor after Marion Grange's resignation.
- Hamilton Hill appears in the Young Justice episode "Alpha Male", voiced by Corey Burton.
- Hamilton Hill appears in Harley Quinn, voiced by Jim Rash. He runs for re-election until Two-Face kills him, leading to the Joker becoming the mayor of Gotham.
- Hamilton Hill appears in Gotham Knights, portrayed by Randall Newsome. This version is an ally of the Court of Owls, who kill him following an attack by the Mutants.

=== Film ===
Hamilton Hill makes a non-speaking cameo appearance in Batman: Mask of the Phantasm.

=== Video games ===
Mayor Hamilton Hill as depicted in Batman: The Telltale Series.

- Hamilton Hill appears in Batman: Vengeance, voiced again by Lloyd Bochner.
- Hamilton Hill appears in Batman: The Telltale Series, voiced by Robert Pescovitz. This version is an ally of the Penguin and the Children of Arkham terrorist group. The Penguin later kills Hill after learning that he was partially responsible for his mother being committed to Arkham Asylum, leading to Harvey Dent succeeding him as mayor.

=== Miscellaneous ===
- Hamilton Hill appears in the DCAU tie-in comic The Batman Adventures, where the Penguin temporarily replaces him as mayor.
- Hamilton Hill appears in The Batman Strikes! #47.
- Hamilton Hill appears in Batman: The Adventures Continue. The Court of Owls kill and resurrect Hill, leading him to join them.
