= Jane Doe (character) =

Publication information
- Publisher: DC Comics
- First appearance: Arkham Asylum: Living Hell #1 (July 2003)
- Created by: Dan Slott (writer); Ryan Sook (artist)

In-story information
- Species: Human
- Abilities: Hand-to-hand combat Master of disguise Voice mimicry

Jane Doe is a character appearing in American comic books published by DC Comics. She first appeared in Arkham Asylum: Living Hell #1 and was created by Dan Slott and Ryan Sook.

Doe has also appeared in other DC media, such as the fifth season of Gotham, portrayed by Sarah Pidgeon, and Gotham Knights, portrayed by Lindy Booth.

== Fictional character biography ==
Jane Doe is a serial killer who observes her targets and then kills them before assuming their identity. She first appears disguised as Arkham Asylum therapist Anne Carver. When Doe is about to kill her latest patient, Warren White, Batman exposes Doe's identity while White finds the real Carver's body. Guards arrive to contain the situation, but Batman tells them to stay back while he speaks with Doe. Doe states that she wanted to look into the madness of Arkham Asylum by posing as Carver, and that by compiling her own psychological profile, she has realized that her desire to steal other people's identities is driven by a need to fill an "emptiness" within her. Doe breaks down as the guards take her back to her cell. Doe later assumes the identity of an Arkham security guard named Wrigley and kidnaps White during a prison riot.

After the Black Glove's failed plan to destroy Batman, Jane Doe and the other inmates from Arkham Asylum are transferred to Blackgate Penitentiary until Arkham is completely decontaminated. Black Mask organizes a plan of action that involves Doe, Adam Bomb, Firefly, and the other escaped Arkham patients. When Commissioner James Gordon visits District Attorney Hampton's office and tries to get an arrest warrant on Two-Face, Doe breaks into the office, shooting Hampton and Gordon as a "message from Two-Face". She is unaware that Gordon was wearing a bulletproof vest that saved his life.

Jane Doe is reintroduced in The New 52 continuity reboot, where she arrives at a bank posing as wealthy socialite Vivian Wenner. When her accountant states that Wenner is legally dead and cannot access her accounts, a shootout occurs that attracts the attention of Batman. Doe gives Batman the slip and is saved by the villain Wrath. Wrath persuades Doe to take a disguise to infiltrate the Gotham City Police Department. When Batman confronts Harvey Bullock, he deduces that he is not the real Bullock as Doe sheds her disguise. After being remanded to Arkham Asylum, Doe chooses Batman as her next target.

== Powers and abilities ==
Jane Doe is driven by a psychological need to "become" other people, and thus is highly skilled at assuming the identities of anyone she chooses. Her choice method is removing her victim's skin and hair, wearing them over her own body, and then perfectly mimicking her victim's voice. Doe's disguises are usually near-perfect. She was able to spend two months impersonating Dr. Anne Carver before being discovered by Batman. Underneath her disguises, Doe's real appearance is that of a woman without her own skin, only muscle and tissue. Doe is skilled at hand-to-hand combat and is an expert at psychological manipulation and strategy.

== In other media ==
=== Television ===
- Jane Doe appears in the Gotham episode "Nothing's Shocking", portrayed by Sarah Pidgeon. This version is Jane Cartwright, an initial inmate at Arkham Asylum before being transferred to the Indian Hill facility to be experimented on by Hugo Strange, who granted her the ability to shapeshift. However, this led her to wear a mask under the belief that her real face had been hideously disfigured. In the present, she breaks out to seek revenge on the police officers who arrested her mother Victoria before Jane is eventually killed by Harvey Bullock.
- Jane Doe appears in Gotham Knights, portrayed by Lindy Booth. This version is a con artist who pursued an affair with Harvey Dent, through whom she had a daughter, Duela Doe, and lost her original identity after taking on numerous aliases before being incarcerated at Arkham Asylum. In the present, Jane attempts to force Duela to kill Dent, only to be killed by him.

=== Video games ===
Jane Doe appears as a character summon in Scribblenauts Unmasked: A DC Comics Adventure.
