= Hana Hayes =

American actress

- Occupation: Actress
- Years active: 2009–present

Hana Hayes is an American actress. She provided the voice and motion capture of Sarah in the action-adventure video game The Last of Us (2013), and portrayed Lizzie Sanderson in the legal comedy series The Grinder (2015–2016).

== Career ==
Hayes has played guest roles in series such as Law & Order: Special Victims Unit, Criminal Minds, and Grey's Anatomy. In 2013, she provided the voice and motion capture for Sarah in the action-adventure video game The Last of Us. In 2015, she began playing Lizzie Sanderson in the legal comedy series The Grinder. In 2018, she played the younger Elise Rainer in the horror film Insidious: The Last Key.

== Filmography ==
=== Film ===
Year	Title	Role	Notes
2012	Thunderstruck	Ashley Newall	
2014	A Beautiful Now	Young Romy	
2014	Mercy	Girl Next Door	
2015	Stockholm, Pennsylvania	Leia (aged 12)	
2016	Day of Reckoning	Maddy	
2017	To the Bone	Chloe	
2018	Insidious: The Last Key	Young Elise Rainier	
2019	Relish	Aspen	
2019	Her Mind in Pieces	Daughter	Segment: "Here Now"

=== Television ===
Year	Title	Role	Notes
2011	Criminal Minds	Ally Dolan	Episode: "Dorado Falls"
2011–2013	Bucket and Skinner's Epic Adventures	Tammy Lynch	3 episodes
2013	Law & Order: Special Victims Unit	Brooke Allen	Episode: "Dissonant Voices"
2015	Grey's Anatomy	Danielle	Episode: "I Feel the Earth Move'"
2015–2016	The Grinder	Lizzie Sanderson	22 episodes
2017	S.W.A.T.	April	Episode: "Imposters"
2018	T@gged	Tessa	

=== Video games ===
Year	Title	Role	Notes
2013	The Last of Us	Sarah	Voice and motion capture
2022	The Last of Us Part I	Sarah	Voice and motion capture
