= Characters of The Last of Us (video game) =

Characters in The Last of Us video game

The two lead characters of The Last of Us, Ellie (left) and Joel (right) in a promotional image for the game

The Last of Us, a 2013 action-adventure survival horror video game developed by Naughty Dog, deals with the relationship between smuggler Joel, and Ellie. Joel is tasked with escorting Ellie across a post-apocalyptic United States in an attempt to create a potential cure against an infection to which Ellie is immune. The relationship between the two characters became the basis of the game's development.

Joel is the primary playable character of the game, though players assume control of Ellie for a short portion. Throughout their journey, Joel and Ellie meet various characters: Tess, a survivor who is closely acquainted with Joel; Marlene, leader of the militia group the Fireflies; Bill, a survivor who fortified his own town; Henry and Sam, brothers from Hartford; Joel's brother, Tommy, and his wife, Maria, who have built their own settlement; and David, the leader of a group of cannibals. In addition, Joel's daughter Sarah appears in the game's prologue, and Ellie's friend Riley Abel is featured in the downloadable content pack The Last of Us: Left Behind.

A team at Naughty Dog designed the character appearances, and creative director Neil Druckmann was the main writer of their personalities and mannerisms. The actors were given considerable license to improvise the lines and influence character personality, simultaneously performing the motion capture work for their characters. Various characters were influenced by the story progression, ultimately becoming completely different from the initial vision. The relationship of the characters received praise from several gaming publications, and the acting has resulted in multiple awards, including two BAFTAs and a D.I.C.E. Award.

== Creation and conception ==
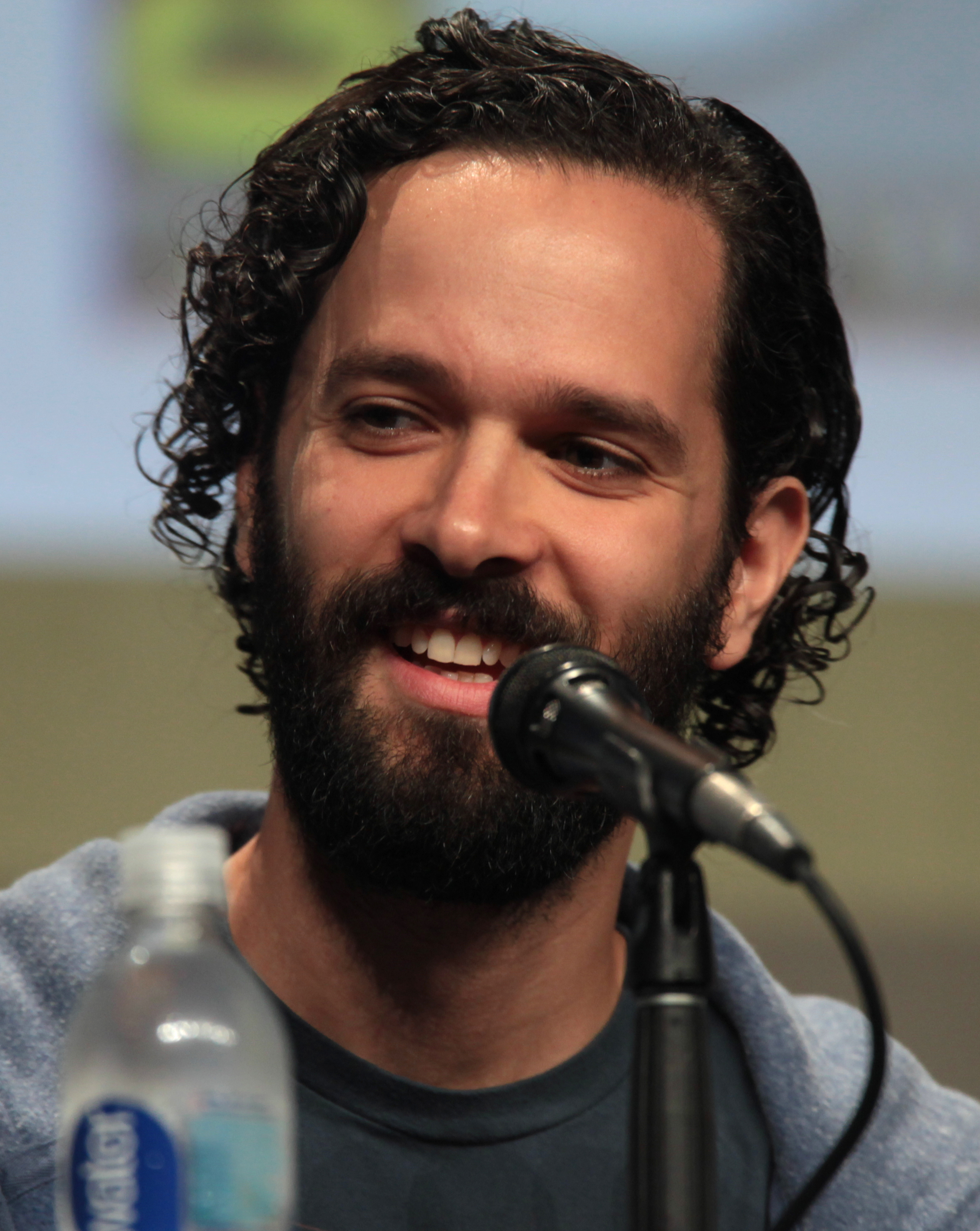
Neil Druckmann worked as the creative director on The Last of Us, writing the game's story and developing the characters.

The relationship between the characters of Joel and Ellie, portrayed by Troy Baker and Ashley Johnson, respectively, was the central focus of the game's development. Creative director Neil Druckmann wrote the game's script, particularly focusing on the characters. Though the development team quickly felt that Johnson fit the role of Ellie, they spent more time selecting the actor of Joel, as the chemistry between the two characters was imperative to the game. After Baker and Johnson played alongside each other, the team realized that the former perfectly fit the role of Joel, despite the actor's young age. Baker and Johnson contributed greatly to the development of the characters. For example, Baker convinced Druckmann that Joel would care for Tess due to his loneliness, and Johnson convinced Druckmann to rewrite the character of Ellie in a stronger and more defensive manner. Some of the dialogue between the duo was improvised by the actors; Druckmann attributed this to the fact that the script included an unnecessary number of lines during gameplay sections, and he allowed the actors to choose what they felt was necessary.

From the beginning of development, the team intended for The Last of Us to feature dual protagonists with strong individual story arcs. The character interactions were inspired by the relationship between Nathan Drake and Tenzin in Uncharted 2: Among Thieves (2009), in turn inspired by the video game Ico (2001). The game's protagonists represent the two eras that are shown in the game; Joel represents the world before the outbreak, having spent most of his life during this period, while Ellie represents the world after the outbreak, as she was born in the post-apocalyptic world. While the former is emotionally damaged due to the loss that he has experienced, the latter maintains an optimistic view of life, having become familiar to the damaged world; spending time with each other saw these qualities overlapping, with Joel become more lively, and Ellie learning more survival skills.

The character's performances were mostly recorded using motion capture technology; approximately 85% of the game's animations were recorded using motion capture, with remaining audio elements recorded later in a studio. The development team felt that the post-apocalyptic world and the survival horror genre gave them the opportunity to better develop the characters. Taking inspiration from their work on the Uncharted games, the team used their knowledge of paralleling characters with the conflict in both gameplay and stories when developing The Last of Us. They took inspiration from the books The Road (2006) and City of Thieves (2008), and the film No Country for Old Men (2007), noting that they all include memorable characters and using this as a point of inspiration. "[W]e can make you as a player feel more of what it's truly like to exist inside of a world where every bullet counts and each step you take is a conscious choice that's going to make or break your existence," said Bruce Straley, the game director. The team felt the "pressures of the world" allowed them to better develop their characters. They felt that the pressure forced the characters to make interesting decisions, allowing better development.

== Lead characters ==
=== Joel ===
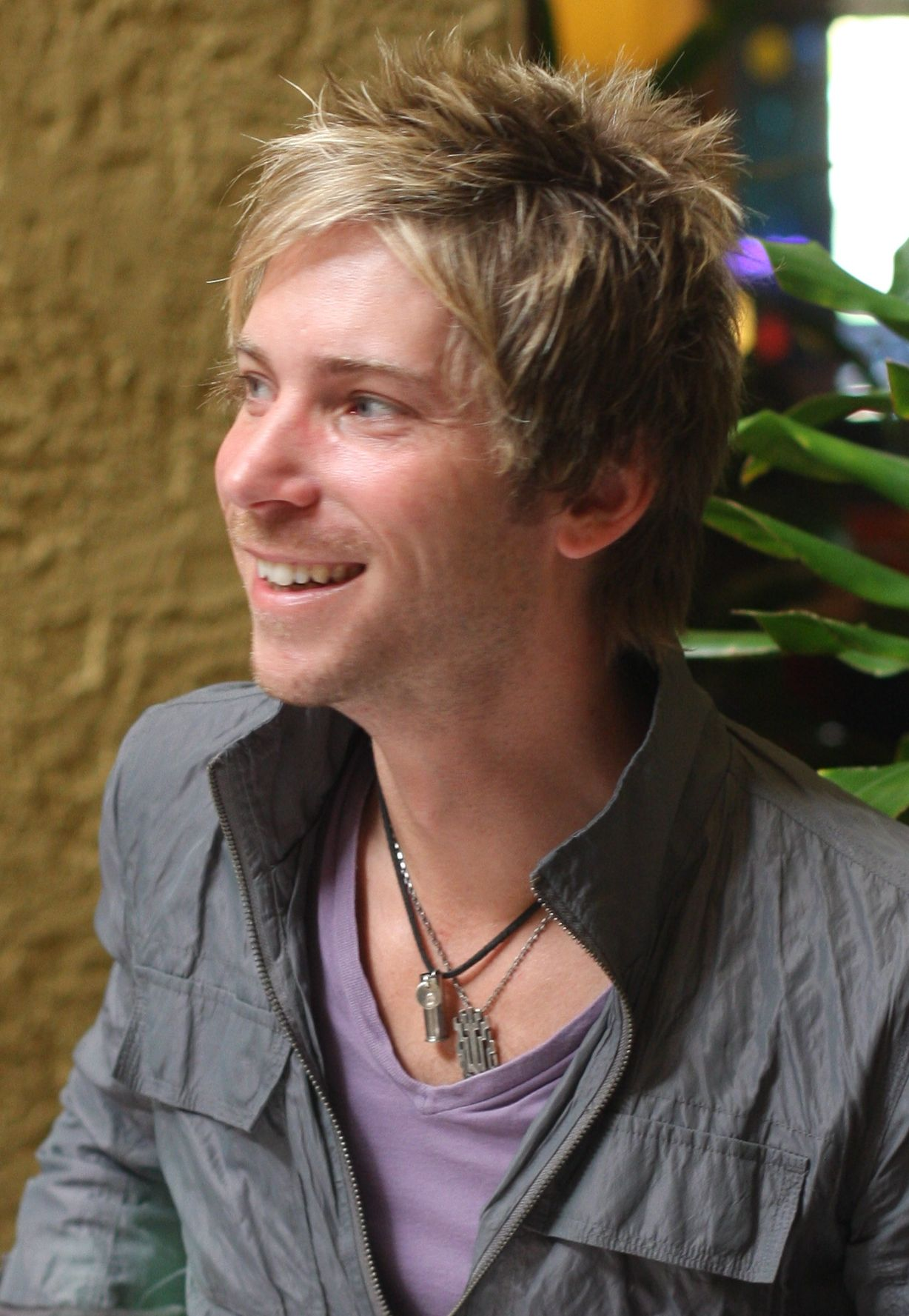
Veteran voice actor Troy Baker was cast as Joel due to his voice and movement.

Joel Miller (Troy Baker) is the protagonist of The Last of Us. From Texas, Joel was a single father in his late 20s or early 30s (Note: Joel was initially described as being "in his late forties" in The Last of Us (2013) while in-game details in The Last of Us Part I (2022) list his birth year as 1981, putting him in his early 50s.) when the initial Cordyceps outbreak occurred. Fleeing with his brother Tommy and his twelve-year-old daughter Sarah, they got involved in a firefight with a soldier, and Sarah was mortally wounded and died in his arms, leaving him traumatized. In the 20 years that follow, Joel did whatever he had to do to survive.

Twenty years after Sarah's death, Joel works as a smuggler in the Boston quarantine zone with his friend and partner Tess. While out searching for a former accomplice who stole some of their merchandise, Joel and Tess are tasked by Marlene, an acquaintance and the leader of a rebel militia called the Fireflies, to smuggle Ellie to a rendezvous point. En route to deliver Ellie, Joel discovers she is immune to the infection. Upon their arrival, Tess reveals she has sustained a bite on the journey and insists Joel find Tommy, a former Firefly, in order to continue the mission. Joel is initially surly and short tempered towards Ellie, though he begins to warm up to her as their journey continues. This is compounded when Joel, having initially asked Tommy to carry on in his place after meeting up with him, changes his mind and carries on as planned. Their bond deepens when Ellie nearly loses Joel to a severe injury, and when he comes to her aid after she is nearly killed by a band of cannibals. Ultimately, Joel shows his devotion to Ellie when he chooses to rescue her from the doctors who plan to remove and examine her brain, as opposed to allowing her to die. To ensure they are not pursued, Joel kills Marlene. Driving away, Ellie wakes up, after which Joel tells her the doctors gave up on discovering a cure. Ellie later confronts him about the events, and Joel swears to her he was telling the truth.

When designing Joel's physical appearance, the team tried to make him look "flexible enough" to allow for him to appear as both a "ruthless operator in the underground of a quarantined city" as well as a "caring father figure to Ellie". When writing the character of Joel, Druckmann initially took inspiration from Josh Brolin's portrayal of Llewelyn Moss in No Country for Old Men, which he saw as "very quiet, very cool under pressure". However, Baker's interpretation of Joel as a more emotional person evolved the character in a different way. Druckmann felt players, specifically parents, would be able to relate to Joel's character and his bonding with Ellie. Druckmann became intrigued by players who discussed Joel's morality, distinguishing him as a hero or villain; Druckmann felt Joel was only "a complex person who's made good and bad decisions", but allowed it to be open to interpretation. When auditioning for the role, Baker read a phrase on the character sheet that stated Joel had "few moral lines left to cross", which became the "anchor point" to the character for him.

Baker returned to play Joel in The Last of Us Part II (2020), and portrays James in the HBO television adaptation; Pedro Pascal plays Joel in the show.

=== Ellie ===
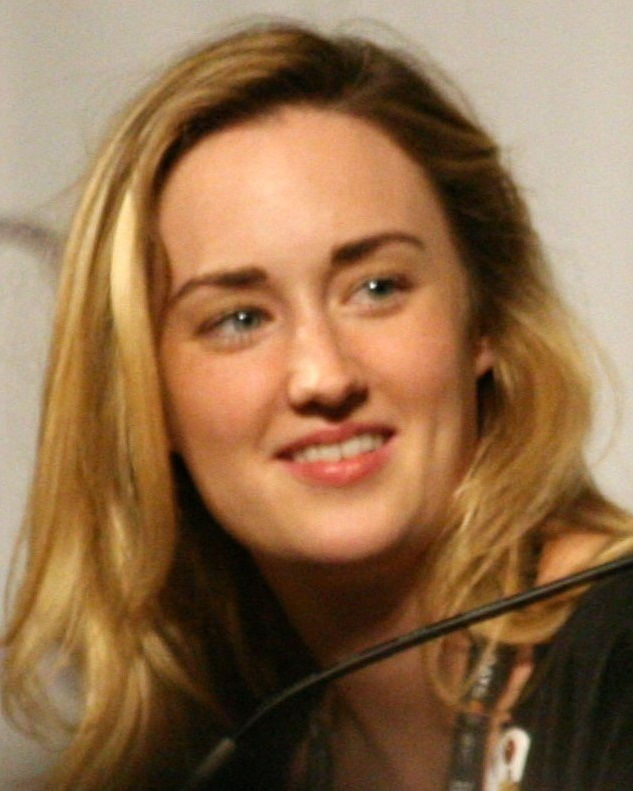
Ashley Johnson was excited to portray Ellie as she felt video games rarely feature such strong female characters.

Ellie (Ashley Johnson) is a fourteen-year-old orphan and the other main playable character in the game, and one of the few characters to have never known life before the infection. Much of her backstory is revealed in the additional content The Last of Us: Left Behind and the comic book miniseries The Last of Us: American Dreams.

After surviving a bite from the Infected, Ellie is tasked to Joel to be escorted to the Fireflies. Initially annoyed by Joel's surliness, Ellie starts to feel a strong attachment to him. After experiencing a traumatizing encounter in the Winter, in which Ellie is nearly raped and murdered by a band of cannibals, she becomes withdrawn and introverted. When Joel finally gets her to the Fireflies, it is discovered she has a mutant strain of the Cordyceps fungus growing on her brain, which may be used to create a vaccine; in order to extract the fungi, an operation on Ellie's brain is required that will likely kill her. While she is being prepared for surgery, Joel makes his way to the operating room and carries her to safety. When Ellie awakens from unconsciousness, Joel lies by telling her the Fireflies found many other subjects, and had stopped looking for a cure. Ellie later confronts him about it, demanding to know the truth. When he reassures her he is telling the truth, she replies with "Okay".

The team felt establishing Ellie's physical appearance was "critical"; they felt she needed to appear young enough to make her relationship with Joel believable, but old enough to be credible as a resourceful teenager capable of surviving. When questioned about the inspiration for Ellie as a gameplay feature, Druckmann recalled when he and Straley were brainstorming ideas for Uncharted 2: Among Thieves and created a mute character who would summon the player to follow them, creating a "beautiful" relationship through gameplay alone. Though this concept was never included in the final game, the idea was raised when the team were discussing a new project, ultimately inspiring Ellie. Following the release of Left Behind, in which Ellie is seen kissing her friend Riley, Druckmann confirmed she is gay.

Johnson returned to play Ellie in The Last of Us Part II, and portrays Ellie's mother Anna in the HBO television adaptation; Bella Ramsey plays Ellie in the show.

== Secondary characters ==
=== Tommy ===
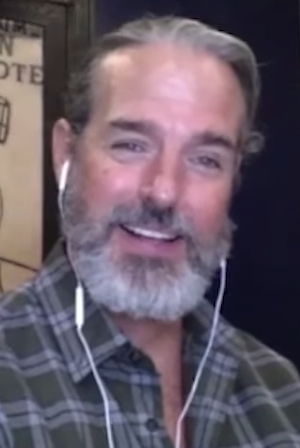
Jeffrey Pierce auditioned for the role of Joel, but was eventually cast as Tommy.

Tommy (Jeffrey Pierce) is Joel's brother. At the initial outbreak, he picked Joel and Sarah up in his car to take them to safety. When the car is hit by a truck, he defends Joel as he carries Sarah, whose leg is badly hurt. After Sarah's death, Joel and Tommy initially survive together, but differing outlooks and Joel's hardened ways led to their estrangement, and Tommy left to join the Fireflies. After becoming disillusioned, he subsequently left them as well, and built a settlement around a working power plant in Wyoming with his wife, Maria. Many years later, Joel arrives at Tommy's settlement, and the brothers are reunited. Tommy initially refuses to take Ellie off Joel's hands, but upon seeing their close bond and realizing Joel does not trust himself to protect Ellie, he agrees to take her to Marlene himself. However, Ellie confronts Joel about Sarah and, after having a change of heart, Joel and Ellie continue their journey after Tommy promises them sanctuary should they need it.

The development team aimed for Tommy's physical appearance to resemble Joel "in stature and rugged toughness", but also to express his compassionate approach to the world. While Tommy shares Joel's "gritty masculinity", he has a gentleness which Joel lacks. Pierce auditioned for the role of Joel, which was later given to Troy Baker. When the team was required to cast an actor for the role of Tommy, they immediately contacted Pierce, as they were impressed by his audition. Baker felt the chemistry between him and Pierce assisted in the realistic relationship between Joel and Tommy.

Pierce reprised the role of Tommy in The Last of Us Part II, and portrays the quarantine rebel Perry in the HBO television adaptation; Gabriel Luna plays Tommy in the show.

=== Marlene ===
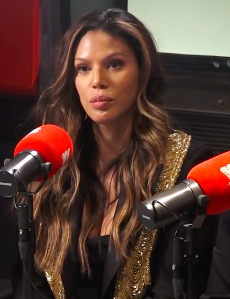
Merle Dandridge portrayed Marlene.

Marlene (Merle Dandridge) is the leader of the Fireflies, a militia movement hoping to wrest military occupation of the Quarantine Zones and restore government control. She was tasked by Ellie's mother, a close friend of hers, to look out for her daughter, but Ellie only met her after her infection. After being wounded in Boston, she offers to sell Joel and Tess the merchandise Robert stole from them and sold to her in return for smuggling Ellie out of the Quarantine Zone. Joel meets Marlene again at the Firefly hospital in Salt Lake City, where scientists are running tests on Ellie. Marlene reveals they will operate on Ellie, which will result in her death; Joel disagrees with the operation and fights back. After Joel rescues Ellie, Marlene tries to stop him from leaving, insisting taking Ellie will merely delay her death until a more gruesome one occurs, and Ellie's return to her would help to create a cure against the infection. Joel disregards her and instead shoots her in the stomach. She begs for her life, but Joel executes her with a shot to the head, ensuring no-one is left to come after them.

The team aimed for Marlene's physical design to make her look "capable and in control", while conveying compassion, to result in players believing she does care for Ellie. Dandridge found the character of Marlene to be complex, believing she "wants to do the best thing for the greater good", but events in her life have resulted in a confused moral standing. Though she personally believed Marlene is a fundamentally "good" person, Dandridge felt the ambiguous morality of the characters is a significant contributor to the interest in their humanity. Dandridge appreciated the use of motion capture, comparing it to theater productions.

Dandridge reprised her role for flashback scenes in The Last of Us Part II, and reprised her role in the HBO television adaptation.

=== Tess ===
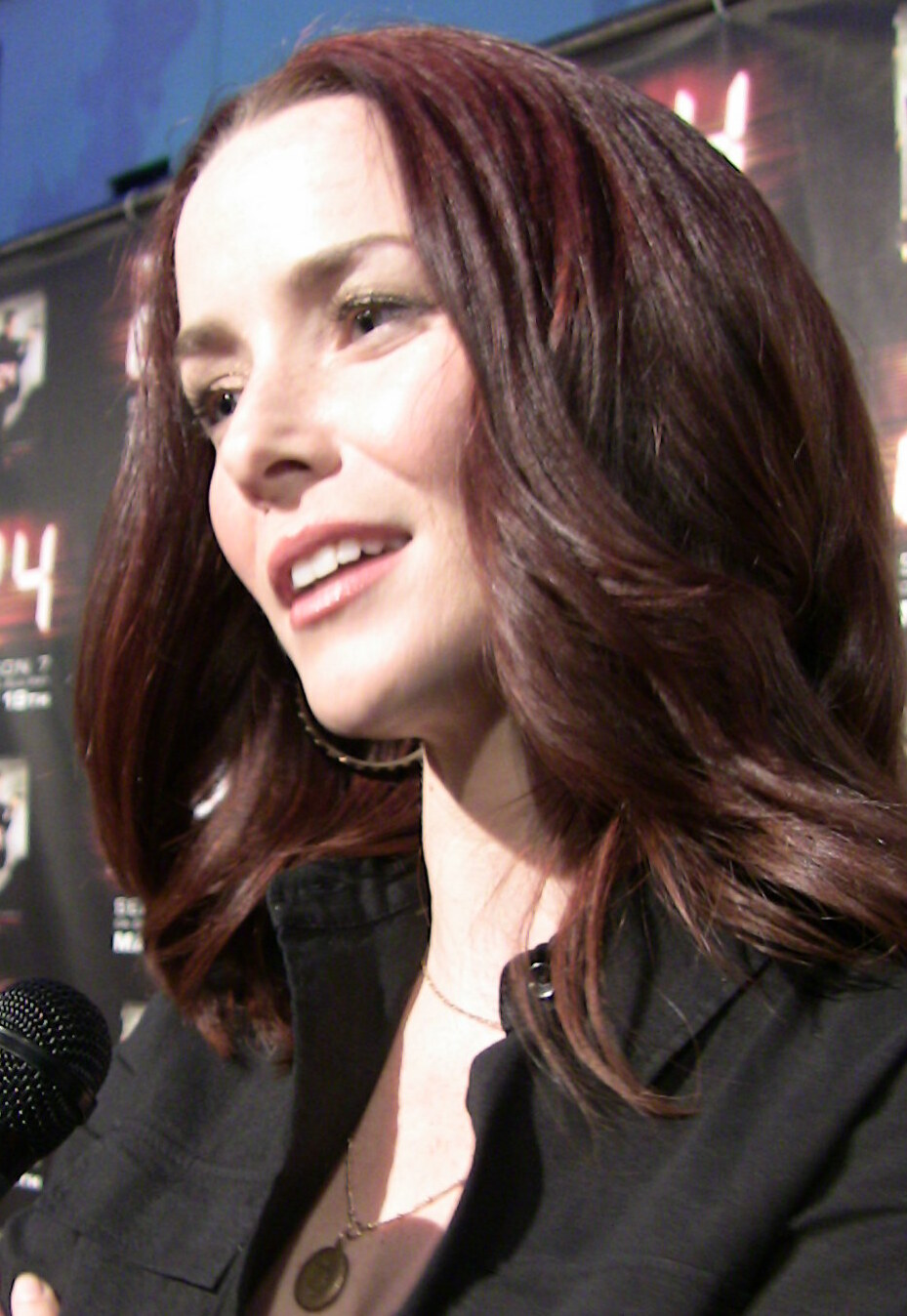
Annie Wersching portrayed Tess.

Tess (Annie Wersching) is Joel's smuggling partner and friend. After chasing down and killing Robert, a former accomplice who stole their merchandise, Tess and Joel are offered their merchandise back from Robert's buyer, Marlene, if they agree to help smuggle Ellie to the State Capitol building outside of the Quarantine Zone with Joel. She and Joel successfully make it to the Capitol building, only to discover upon arrival that the people they are meant to rendezvous with are all dead. When Joel protests they must return, Tess insists she cannot go any further and reveals she was bitten on the journey. As soldiers arrive at the building, Tess orders Joel, as a last obligation to her, to find Tommy and get Ellie to the Fireflies, before sending them off while she covers them. Tess is then killed in the subsequent gunfight.

When designing the physical appearance of Tess, the team aimed to make her look "tough and capable", striving to add an element of strength in order to show she might be more ruthless than Joel. Tess was intended to be featured as the main antagonist of The Last of Us, pursuing Joel for a year before a final confrontation in which she is killed by Ellie. However, the team found it difficult to believe Tess would dispute with Joel and pursue him for a year; this was solved by majorly altering the story. Wersching was impressed by the script, and Druckmann's ability to write unique female characters. When writing the game's female characters, particularly Tess and Ellie, Druckmann avoided external influences, such as the media's portrayal of women, since he wished to write his own story.

Tess is played by Anna Torv in the HBO television adaptation.

=== Bill ===
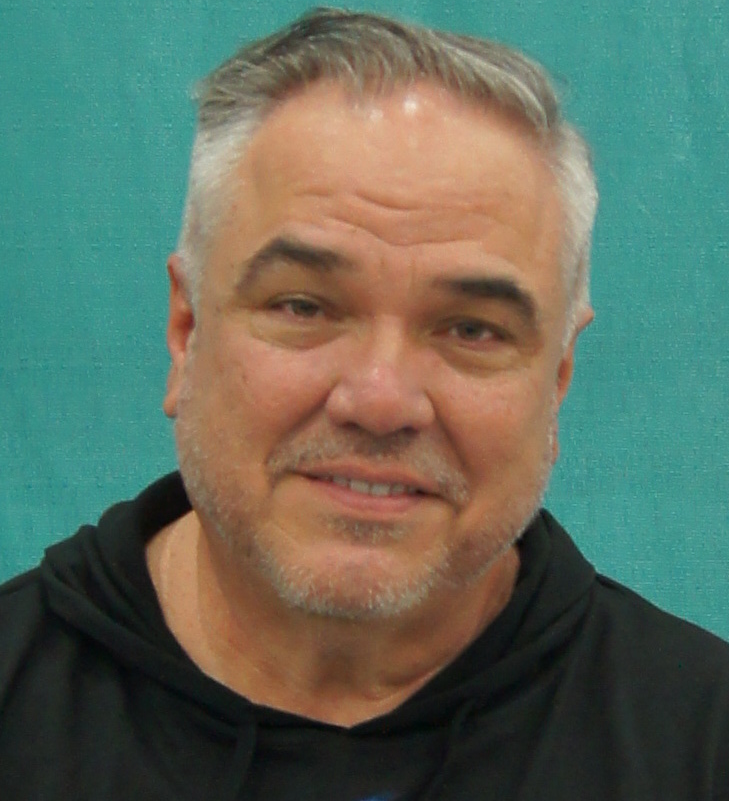
W. Earl Brown portrayed Bill.

Bill (W. Earl Brown) is a survivalist and business partner of Joel and Tess who lives in Lincoln, Massachusetts, near Boston. A paranoid, aggressive, and distrustful man in his late 40s, Bill lives alone in a heavily fortified town, laden with his traps that include some captured Infected. During the game, Joel finds Bill in the hope that Bill will pay off a debt by fixing up a car for Joel and Ellie to drive to Tommy's community, but Bill insists the only working car battery is in the unexplored part of town. After fighting their way to the local high school, Bill discovers the battery he was going to use is missing. They escape the swarms of infected surrounding the school and find themselves in an abandoned house, where Bill discovers his former partner, Frank, has committed suicide by hanging; it is revealed the two had had a falling out and Frank had been planning to escape in Bill's car. After getting the car started, Joel drops Bill off and expresses sympathy for what happened between him and Frank. Bill merely responds by ensuring that their debt is settled and then ordering Joel to leave his town. In The Last of Us Part II, set four years later, Ellie tells Dina about Bill and his traps.

Bill's appearance was designed to reflect practicality, as opposed to self-expression; most of his clothing and gear can be used as survival tools. Bill is revealed to be homosexual at one point in the game. Druckmann initially left this vague in the script but was inspired at the script read-through to alter a few lines to further reflect Bill's sexuality. To make Bill interesting, Druckmann explored the concept of contradictory statements; while Bill states becoming attached to people will lower chances of survival, it is revealed he had a partner he really cared for. Bill's role in the game is to voice Joel's concerns about escorting Ellie since Joel himself doesn't voice them. "[T]he reason to have Bill there is that Bill can actually say that to Joel, and warn Joel about that stuff," Druckmann said. Sam Einhorn of GayGamer.net felt the revelation of Bill's sexuality "added to his character ... without really tokenizing him". American organization GLAAD named Bill one of the "most intriguing new LGBT characters of 2013", calling him "deeply flawed but wholly unique".

Bill was played by Nick Offerman in the HBO television adaptation; Con O'Neill was cast in the role but was forced to drop out due to scheduling conflicts.

=== Henry and Sam ===
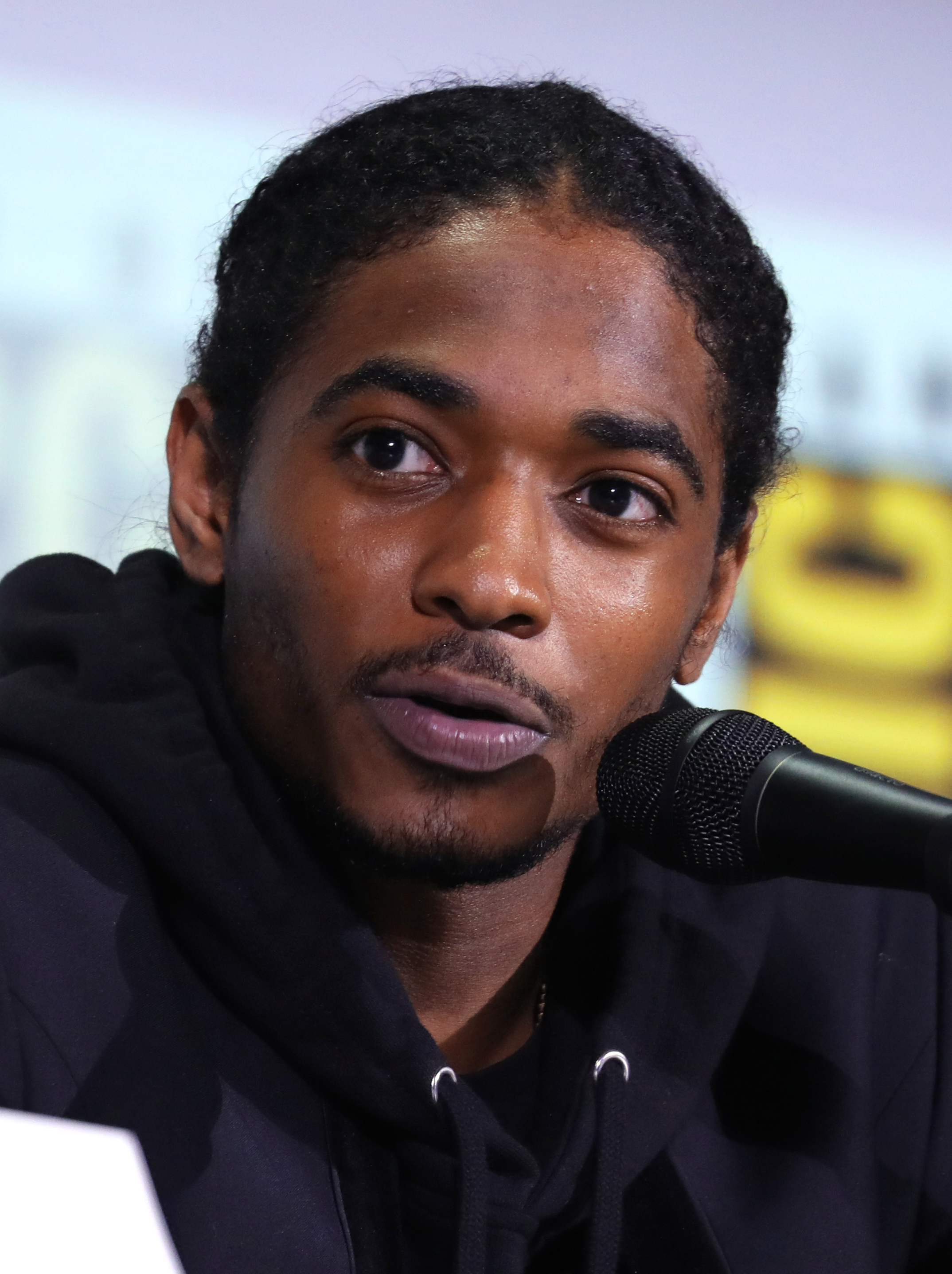
Nadji Jeter portrayed Sam.

Henry (Brandon Scott) and Sam (Nadji Jeter) are brothers Ellie and Joel encounter while trying to escape from a group of hunters in Pittsburgh. Henry is 25 years old, while Sam is 13. Joel and Henry initially think each other are hostile, until they see Sam and Ellie, respectively. Like Joel, Henry is an experienced survivor, and the two decide to team up, since both pairs are looking for the Fireflies. They work together to overpower the bandits guarding the exit to the Quarantine Zone, and escape to an abandoned radio tower in the Suburbs. There, Joel and Henry bond over their mutual love of motorbikes, but Sam becomes morose and introverted, particularly after a conversation with Ellie over death and the Infected. The next day, it emerges that Sam was bitten while escaping the Suburbs, and he attacks Ellie, forcing Henry to kill him. Overcome with grief and guilt at his brother's death, Henry commits suicide with his gun.

Both the physical appearance and behavior of Henry and Sam were designed to reflect that of Joel and Ellie; the backpack and jeans worn by both duos reflect the physical resemblance, while the behavioral resemblance was in that they are both forced to make tough decisions over time. After Brandon Scott was chosen to portray Henry, the team only showed him some artistic sketches of the game, avoiding specific details about the story. Scott enjoyed portraying the character, particularly due to the fact he was allowed to introduce elements of his own personality. "You don't have to plan [the little nuances] ... because you get to just be the character," Scott said. He felt recording the voice and actions simultaneously was "exciting" and helpful. The team felt Henry's actions are dedicated to protecting Sam, and Scott introduced that dedication to the character. Druckmann stated Henry and Sam's relationship mirrored Joel and Ellie's. Ellie was seen by the team as a mentor to Sam. Johnson felt Sam was "genuinely scared", admiring this significant difference from the game's other characters.

In the HBO television adaptation, Henry and Sam are portrayed by Lamar Johnson and Keivonn Woodard, respectively. Pittsburgh is replaced by Kansas City, and Sam is a deaf eight-year-old.

=== David ===
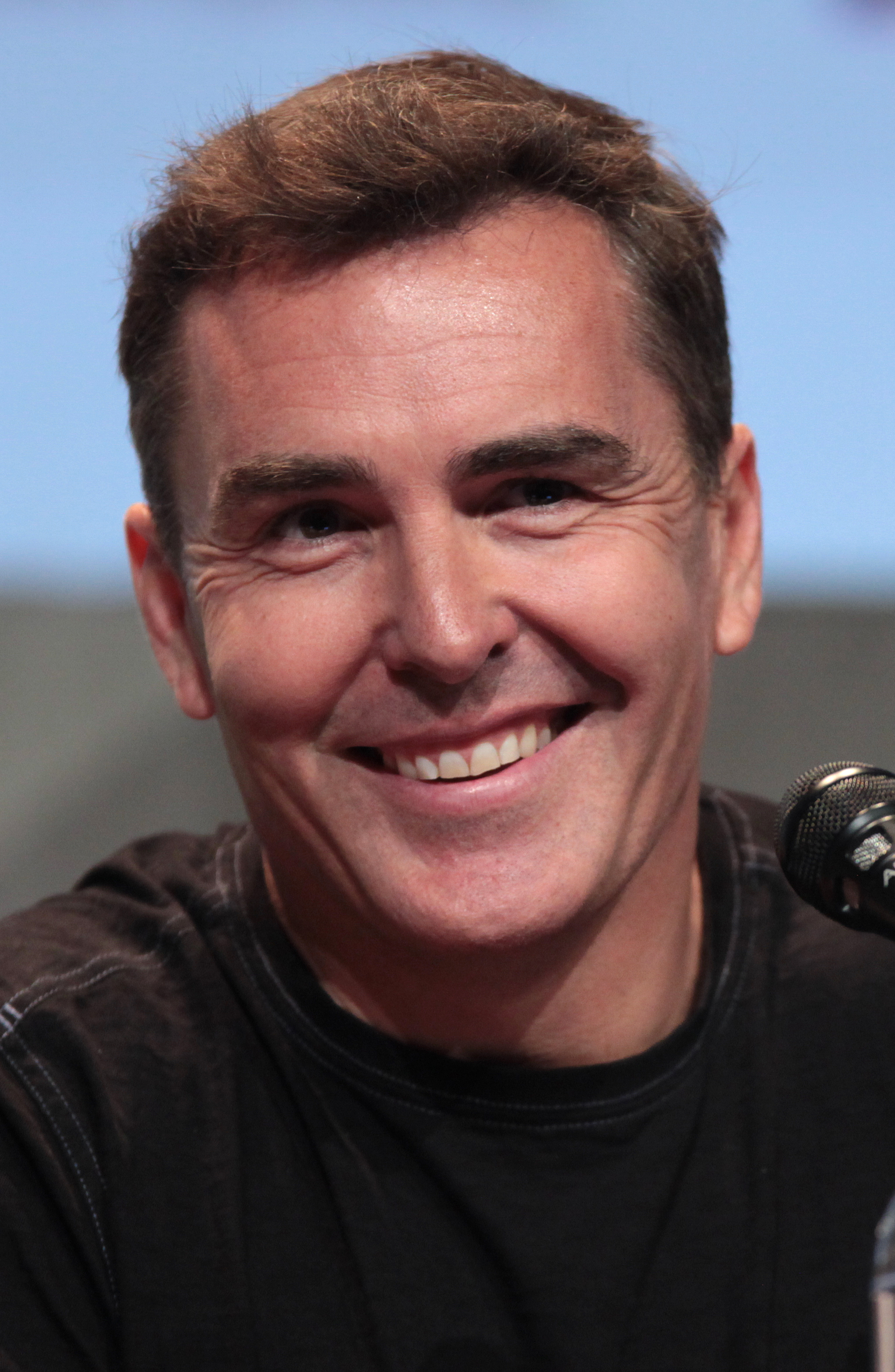
Veteran voice actor Nolan North was cast as David in The Last of Us. North portrayed protagonist Nathan Drake in Naughty Dog's Uncharted series.

David (Nolan North) is the leader of a group of cannibals Ellie encounters at the Lakeside Resort, where she is sheltering Joel while he recovers from a grievous wound. Initially, Ellie runs into him and a fellow hunter after killing a deer, and he offers to trade the deer for some penicillin for Joel. After he and Ellie are forced to fend off a swarm of infected, David reveals he is the leader of the gang of hunters Ellie and Joel had killed previously at the University of Eastern Colorado, when Joel was injured. He allows Ellie to get away but later tracks her down and kidnaps her, taking her to his base in the town. There, Ellie discovers David's gang are cannibals. She resists their attempts to recruit her, manages to kill his assistant, and flees into the town, but David and his gang stalk her. David eventually corners her in a restaurant and stalks her for several minutes as it burns down. Eventually, he manages to pin her down and tries to strangle her, but she catches hold of his machete and swings it, knocking him off her, and brutally hacks him to death before Joel arrives and pulls her off.

David's physical posture and gestures were specifically designed to suggest a warm and caring nature, making players believe his acceptance to welcome Ellie to his community. Veteran voice actor Nolan North, who portrays protagonist Nathan Drake in Naughty Dog's Uncharted series, was chosen to play the role of David. When approached by Druckmann about the role, North immediately accepted the part, appreciating its diversity from his previous acting roles. When portraying David, North was required to change his voice to fit the role. The first voice he proposed to Druckmann was ultimately chosen for the game; he describes it as "very quiet ... and the voice can break a little". To portray the character, North approached his personality from multiple perspectives, viewing David as a "survivor". North empathized with David, stating most of David's actions were understandable when considering the apocalyptic situation. He felt David was initially attempting to protect Ellie, who was viewed as a "glimmer of hope". Prior to the writing of the script, David was referred to as the "cannibal king", and it was known Ellie would encounter an enemy that would change her. When North was cast, the team found it interesting to make David charismatic and infatuated with Ellie.

Scott Shepherd portrays David in the HBO television adaptation.

=== Riley ===
Riley Abel (Yaani King) is Ellie's best friend. Appearing in the Left Behind additional content, Ellie and Riley became friends at the military boarding school where Ellie was sent when she turned thirteen, where at some point Riley left to join the Fireflies. At the start of Left Behind, she returns after a long absence, and ambushes Ellie in her room. The two go to their old hangout in an abandoned shopping mall, where they fight over Riley's revelation that she will soon be posted to another city. Ellie eventually supports her decision, but as the two dance together before parting, Ellie becomes tearful, and begs Riley not to leave. Without hesitation, Riley rips her dog tags off, deciding to choose Ellie instead of the Fireflies. Moved, Ellie impulsively kisses her, which she returns. Overjoyed, Riley and Ellie are pondering how to proceed when they are attacked by infected. Both sustain bites, and decide to embrace in their final hours together. Riley turns, while Ellie does not.

King prepared for the role of Riley by studying the single-player campaign of The Last of Us, as well as the comic book American Dreams. She stated Riley has "an extremely strong personality, very driven, very confident for a 16-year-old". King felt Riley and Ellie have a really close friendship, requiring each other to survive. She noted they care about each other and can both rely on their relationship. She saw Riley as Ellie's mentor, helping her discover new perspectives in the world.

Storm Reid portrays Riley in the HBO television adaptation.

=== Sarah ===
Sarah (Hana Hayes) is Joel's twelve-year-old daughter, whom he had when he was in his late teens, and the game's first playable character. The posters and photos on her wall suggest she was a keen soccer player. At the start of the game, she gives her father a new watch for his birthday. In the early hours of the next day, she is awoken by a commotion and the sound of Tommy phoning Joel. Joel bursts into his office, retrieves his revolver and shoots their infected neighbor in self-defence. Sarah leaves with Tommy and Joel, but her leg is hurt in a crash, forcing Joel to carry her. On the outskirts of their hometown, they come across a soldier, who follows his orders and shoots at them, fatally wounding Sarah who dies in Joel's arms.

The team felt Sarah's physical appearance should feel authentic, displaying her relationship with Joel, while simultaneously establishing her as a distinct character. They aimed to establish the character as "a down-to-earth girl who shares many qualities with Ellie". On the relationship between Joel and Sarah, Hayes felt they are "more like best friends than father and daughter", citing their playfulness and humor with each other. Hayes felt intimidated during her audition, due to her inexperience with video game performances. She found it difficult to perform lines in the recording studio, preferring to perform them with the body movements; she believed the latter felt more natural. To perform Sarah's death, Hayes forced herself to remember and experience previous moments in her life, such as her grandfather's death.

Nico Parker portrays Sarah in the HBO television adaptation.

=== Other characters ===
- Maria (Ashley Scott) is Tommy's wife, and Joel's sister-in-law. Maria and her father ran a settlement in Jackson County shortly after the outbreak of the infection. When Joel and Ellie visit the settlement, Maria opposes Joel's suggestion for Tommy to escort Ellie to the Fireflies, as she is scared he would come to danger. Ultimately, Joel continues on his journey with Ellie, and Tommy returns to the settlement with Maria. The team aimed for Maria's clothing and demeanor to reflect her "strong and fiercely capable nature". Scott auditioned for the role of Tess; when the team required an actor for Maria, they immediately contacted Scott. She reprised the role for The Last of Us Part II. Rutina Wesley plays Maria in the HBO adaptation.
- James (Reuben Langdon) is David's assistant. He is hunting with David upon their encounter with Ellie, during which he is ordered to gather some supplies from their base. When he returns, he discovers Ellie holding David at gunpoint but is ordered to avoid conflict; Ellie ultimately leaves. When David later captures Ellie, he and James prepare to kill her, restraining her against a table. When Ellie informs them of her infection, James' grip loosens, and Ellie takes advantage of this by stabbing him with a knife, killing him. Druckmann felt Langdon added a dynamic between James and David, in which there is conflict between the two characters, but they still respect each other. Troy Baker plays James in the HBO television adaptation.
- Frank is Bill's ex-partner. A letter that Frank wrote before killing himself reveals Bill's growing paranoia and set-in-his-ways attitude had led to the end of their relationship, and Frank had been intending to take the usable battery, fix up a car and escape Bill's town for good. Frank was portrayed by Murray Bartlett in the HBO television adaptation.
- Ish is an unseen survivor. Through a series of letters, notes and diary entries found over the course of the sewer mission in the Suburbs, it is revealed Ish, a fisherman by profession, had set up shelter in a sewer just after beaching his boat, and later accepted some travelers who had children with them to join him. Over some time, the sewers had turned into a thriving commune, but it came to an end when, after someone accidentally left a door to the outside open, a swarm of infected attacked and killed many of the inhabitants. A final note from Ish in one of the nearby houses reveals he had made it out alive with a few people. Kotaku's Leon Hurley called the story of Ish "the hardest lesson" learned in The Last of Us: Ish is a better person than Joel, but his kindness got other people killed.

== Reception ==
The characters received acclaim. Eurogamer's Oli Welsh found the characters were developed with "real patience and skill", appreciating their emotional value, and Joystiq's Richard Mitchell found the relationships "genuine" and emotional. Andy Kelly of Computer and Video Games found the characters "richly painted", feeling invested in their stories. GameSpot's Carolyn Petit felt the game's sense of humanity is positively reflected through the characters. Tom Hoggins of The Daily Telegraph called the characters "complex" and "flawed", stating they help the game maintain "its own identity".

The character performances received praise, with Edge noting the script improved as a result. Eurogamer's Welsh repeated similar remarks, naming the performances "sympathetic and understated". IGN's Colin Moriarty called the voice acting "consistently superb", and Game Informer's Matt Helgeson felt the actors realistically "convey the heavy emotional toll placed on each character". James Stephanie Sterling of Destructoid felt the voice acting is "impeccably performed", resulting in "genuine and credible" characters. Kotaku's Kirk Hamilton remarked the actors "have an uncommon chemistry and fearlessly tackle their roles", praising their delivery of the emotional material. Some of the actors were awarded for their performances; Troy Baker won awards from Hardcore Gamer and the Spike VGX 2013, while Ashley Johnson received two BAFTAs and a DICE Award, as well as awards from the Spike VGX and The Daily Telegraph.

Many critics discussed the game's depiction of female characters. Jason Killingsworth of Edge praised its lack of sexualized female characters, writing it "offers a refreshing antidote to the sexism and regressive gender attitudes of most blockbuster videogames". Eurogamer's Ellie Gibson praised Ellie as "sometimes strong, sometimes vulnerable, but never a cliché". She felt Ellie is initially established as a "damsel in distress", but this concept is subverted. GameSpot's Petit praised the female characters as morally conflicted and sympathetic, but wrote gender in video games should be evaluated "based on their actual merits, not in relation to other games". Chris Suellentrop of The New York Times acknowledged Ellie was a likable and "sometimes powerful" character, but argued The Last of Us is "actually the story of Joel", stating it is "another video game by men, for men and about men". The Last of Us was praised for its depiction of LGBT characters. A kiss between two female characters in Left Behind was met with positive reactions.
