= Day of Reckoning (2016 film) =

2016 American science fiction action television film

- Screenplay by: Gregory Gieras
- Directed by: Joel Novoa
- Starring: Jackson Hurst; Heather McComb
- Music by: Emilio Kauderer
- Country of origin: United States
- Original language: English

Production
- Producers: Shaked Berenson; Patrick Ewald
- Cinematography: Petr Cikhart
- Editor: Phillip Blackford
- Running time: 93 minutes

Original release
- Network: Syfy
- Release: October 2016

Day of Reckoning is a 2016 American science fiction-action television film directed by Joel Novoa and starring Jackson Hurst and Heather McComb.

== Synopsis ==
The story starts at a mining operation with workers noticing a problem in c-shaft. Monsters erupt to the surface killing all they can find. The same is happening all over the world, wherever a deep hole has been made. News reports say that the military cannot stop the creatures that are described as subterranean and demonic. The attacks last for 24 hours, the creatures retreat and the event is called the day of reckoning. The world governments work on containment and set up stations at all deep-core fissures to seal and monitor them. The story jumps to 15 years later. In between the intro and the current action there have been subsequent attacks that show they are always preceded by masses of dead fish washing up on shorelines and the migrations of birds. Finally there is the lunar eclipse just before the attacks start.

There have been other eclipses in the past without attacks but another one is approaching on Saturday and there is tension. We meet our focal characters. David Sheppard is the chief of maintenance somewhere unnamed. His ex wife works as a high school professor and she is being pursued by a coworker, Milton with whom she agrees to have dinner. The Sheppard’s son Tyler is a high school student and has a girlfriend named Maddie. Her parents are off to Palm Springs while Tyler is spending the weekend with his father. It is implied that the Sheppard’s broke up shortly after the last day of reckoning or possibly as early as the first one. Garret Jensen is a corporal in homeland security and works at one of the monitored fissures. Having survived the first event, he senses that another day of reckoning is about to begin.

At about 1 am David’s uncle Ted calls and warns him that it is happening again and they have until noon to meet him at his underground bunker in Barstow. The fish had already begun washing ashore. At Garret’s gate, one creature had already arrived. By morning Laura calls and wants Tyler to join her in a shelter where Milton has made a reservation, but Tyler has already run off to meet Maddie. He promises to stay with her as they notice birds migrating overhead. At the gate, the first monster (a dog-like creature) kills a soldier while Garret flees. David gets caught in traffic but runs to meet Tyler on foot. They meet and are picked up by Laura and Milton.

At Laura’s insistence they head for the Topanga shelter. When they arrive, the shelter is too full and they are turned away. They instead drive for Barstow but the roads are blocked as more creatures come through the gates and an eclipse begins. Cars stand empty as the drivers abandoned them to seek shelter. David suggests he knows a way to the river they can drive along. He and Milton argue over who will drive when a flying creature takes Milton. The rest get in the car and drive along a large open concrete drainage culvert. They discuss why this is happening and David confirms that they can be killed by salt and cold. They run out of gas but find other cars have tried the same route. David finds a survivor hiding from a bull-like demon. The survivor attacks it with salt as the family piles into the car but the man with the salt does not survive.

They drive to the bunker but Ted does not let them in because Garret is holding a gun to his back. Creatures swarm toward the family but Ted lets them inside at the last moment, introducing them to Garret. Ted claims that he knew Garret’s father. As the creatures batter the shelter’s entrance, Ted’s wife Stella makes stew for everyone. Tyler listens to the radio hearing screams until David turns it off. They eat dinner and Garret tells them about his first Day of Reckoning, theorizing that they can sense human souls and that is what they are eating when they attack. Ted silently indicates to David that Garret is holding them hostage. After dinner Garret pulls a gun and admits that Stella let him in out of pity and he is determined to survive. Tyler tries to attack and is defeated when Maddie notices that the creatures are not trying to get in any more. A snake-demon attacks Stella and in the confusion, Garret is subdued. Ted attacks the snake with salt and David fires at it but Maddie kills it. They tend to Stella and tie up Garret, while a larger bull-demon takes over trying to batter down the door. With 8 hours left, Ted admits there is a back tunnel that leads to the north canyon and a possible escape. Garret claims that he left his fully fueled car in the valley 2 miles away. He offers to get them into the gate, 12 miles away. He claims there are secure rooms for personnel. They take the back way with Stella as the demons get in. They are attacked again after they are out and they untie Garret, who does have a car. The car won’t start at first and rather than be taken by the swarming demons Stella grabs the gun to shoot herself. Ted takes the gun but Stella walks toward the demons. The car starts and they escape as Ted screams. The radio announces that the Topanga shelter was decimated. Garret tries to radio his base but cannot get an answer. Maddie notices that the door is open. They arm themselves and begin to search the facilities. They split up and while Laura and the teenagers treat Ted’s wounds, David and Garret confirm the demons are in the facility. David gets the lights working and Garret shows the various precautions that are in place, including stores of saltwater. The whole group go toward where the volatile chemicals are stored but fail to take into account that in 2 hours all of the demons will be heading back to the fissure. They encounter one of the 2-legged demons which they kill but Garret makes a run for it as soon as they hear additional demons. Garret locks himself in a CD room where he apologizes and gives himself an injection.

David sends his family to seek shelter while he re-routs the saline into the fire suppression system. He uses the vents to sneak past demons still devouring their prey to rout the pipe flows. He tells Tyler through the intercom to pull the fire alarm but several demons are already approaching. Ted hacks his way through them until he pulls the alarm and rains saltwater down on them. The demons struggle and melt into embers and smoke. Ted collapses and the water dies down as time runs out. The ground shakes and they realize that every demon in the vicinity is returning to the underground. The family makes a run for the surface where they encounter Garret who immediately shoots Tyler. He says it is the Devils Day and David knocks him down before he can shoot anyone else. Tyler is wounded but not dead. A huge centipede demon attacks and swallows Garret while the family escape to the medical supply closet. There, Laura directs them to make a cold salt bomb. That destroys the creature as it attacks. The family exits the gate and is safe until the next event.

== Cast ==
- Jackson Hurst as David Shepperd
- Heather McComb as Laura
- Jay Jay Warren as Tyler
- Hana Hayes as Maddy
- Nick Gomez as Garrett Abare
- Raymond J. Barry as Ted
- Barbara Crampton as Stella
- Randy Vasquez as Milton
- Daz Crawford as Carl
- Maz Siam as Ed
- Luis Carazo as Fitzgerald
- Ricardo Chacón as supervisor
- Vaughn Wilkinson as guardsman
- Timothy Charles Ryan Snyder as Ted's double

== Production and filming ==
Filming for Day of Reckoning began in the first week of May 2016 in Los Angeles, California, following the agreement between the director Joel Novoa, screenwriter Gregory Gieras, and actors Jackson Hurst, Heather McComb, Hana Hayes, Jay Jay Warren, Raymond J. Barry, Barbara Crampton, Nick Gomez and Randy Vasquez. A television in the film includes scenes from Big Ass Spider! which shares the same screenwriter as Day of Reckoning.

== Release ==
Day of Reckoning was released as a Syfy original and was shown as part of the channel's 31 Days of Halloween program in October 2016. On January 31, 2017, the film was released in North America as video on demand and digital through Epic Pictures.

== Reception ==
Scott Clark of Starburst wrote "If the effects had been practical and the gore more heavily indulged in, there could have been a rip-roaring time to be had here; instead it's a dour-faced disposable which rambles through its runtime without evoking much reaction". Michelle Swope of Horror News gave the film a 2.5 out of 5, criticizing the plot and special effects, while praising Crampton's performance. The film also got a score of 30 out of a 100 from Culture Crypt.
