= Clyde Thompson =

American prisoner turned chaplain

- Born: 1910; Guymon, Oklahoma
- Died: July 1, 1979 (aged 68–69); Lubbock, Texas
- Occupation: Chaplain
- Spouse: Julia Perryman
- Children: 1

Clyde Vernon Thompson (1910–July 1, 1979) was an American prisoner turned chaplain. He is most noted for being cited and labeled as The Meanest Man in Texas.

The film titled The Meanest Man in Texas has been filmed and is currently in the post production process and is based on the true story and book of the same title (ISBN 978-0-9714958-6-9), written by Don Umphrey. It was produced by Brad Wilson and Casey Bond, and directed by Justin Ward.

Having been convicted three times for murder, Thompson was called “The Meanest Man in Texas” by Texas prison officials in 1938. He was placed in a special solitary confinement cell formerly used as the morgue outside of death row at the Huntsville Unit, also known as "the Walls Unit" in Huntsville, Texas and incarcerated there for the next five and a half years. Despite these dire circumstances, Thompson’s story is now used to illustrate hope for those in seemingly hopeless situations.

Born in Guymon, Oklahoma where his father was an itinerant preacher, Thompson’s first and middle names came from towns in Texas. He stopped attending school after the fourth grade. This was attributable to not starting his formal education until age eight and the frequent moves of his family.

Thompson’s legal troubles started when he went hunting with two brothers, ages 13 and 18, near Cisco, Eastland County, Texas on the night of September 7, 1928. During this trip they encountered brothers, unknown to Thompson but disliked for selfish reasons by his hunting companions who provoked a fight. First encouraged and then pushed into the fray, Thompson ended up shooting each of the brothers, and his comrades otherwise took part in killing them. The bodies were left in the woods, while Thompson and his accomplices returned home and vowed to keep quiet on the event.

The deaths of the highly respected brothers, one of them age 19 and a student at what is now Tarleton State University, and the other in his twenties, shocked and angered citizens throughout west Texas.

Thompson’s collaborators were soon arrested. Charges were dropped against the younger of the two, and he agreed to testify for the prosecution. He subsequently lied on the witness stand in order to spare his older brother. Later, that brother was charged with robbery for things stolen from the two deceased brothers.

Thompson, a naïve country boy feeling great remorse, signed a confession taking full blame for the murders. He refused to testify on his own behalf when his trial for first degree murder started on October 15, 1928. This trial was held in the auditorium of Eastland High School (which is still in use today) because the former county courthouse had been torn down, and a new one was under construction.

As expected, Thompson was found guilty. He was sentenced to die in the electric chair.

While Thompson awaited an appeal trial in the Eastland County Jail, Marshall Ratliff was put in the cell across from his. Ratliff had taken part in what is known as the Santa Claus Bank Robbery in Cisco on December 23, 1927. While trying to escape, the robbers killed Cisco Police Chief G. E. “Bit” Bedford and Police Officer George Carmichael. Ratliff was found guilty of their murders and sent to death row. Seemingly going insane after one of his accomplices was executed, Ratliff was returned to Eastland for a sanity trial.

The jailers apparently assumed that Ratliff had, indeed, lost his wits. After tending to him on the night of November 18, 1929, they left his cell door open momentarily while tending to others. Thompson watched as Ratliff rushed from his cell and scampered down the stairs to the sheriff’s office. There, he obtained a loaded pistol from a desk drawer. Discovering this, jailer Tom Jones rushed Ratliff, who shot him three times. Ratliff was soon subdued, but the wounds to Jones subsequently proved fatal.

The next night a crowd estimated at 2,000 gathered on the streets of Eastland. A large group of men subdued jailer Pack Kilborn while taking the jail keys, pulled a struggling Ratliff from his cell and lynched him in the street. Thompson may have met a similar fate, but due to rumors that someone was planning to help him escape, the key to his cell was locked in a safe at the new courthouse.

Again found guilty at his appeal trial, Thompson was sent to death row in Huntsville, Texas in March, 1931. He was within hours of execution when Texas Governor Ross Sterling commuted his sentence to life in prison. This commutation had been supported by some leading citizens of Eastland County due to the inequity of his sentence in comparison to 10 years in prison assessed to his older hunting companion and their belief that Thompson was mentally deficient.

A year after arriving at the Retrieve Prison Farm, Brazoria County, in 1932, Thompson took part in an ill-fated escape attempt with fellow convicts Barney Allen and E.L. Lester. A guard shot and killed Lester, wounded Allen and recaptured Thompson. The failure of this attempt was due in part to another prisoner, Tommy Ries, who alerted guards that the other three were making a run for it. As Lester lay dying, Thompson promised he would kill the snitch. He and Allen followed through on this promise the following month, resulting in each of them receiving life sentences, the second for Thompson.

Thompson received a third life sentence in 1935 for stabbing and killing inmate Everett Melvin, who attempted to rape him.

In 1936, Thompson was transferred to a special unit known as Little Alcatraz reserved for the most dangerous convicts. This unit was housed at the Eastham Farm in Houston County, Texas. Thompson and others took part in an escape attempt on October 3, 1937, resulting in the deaths of inmates Austin Avers, Forrest Gibson and Roy Thornton. Thornton was the husband of Bonnie Parker who was still legally married to him when she and Clyde Barrow were killed on May 23, 1934.

Thompson was later falsely accused of killing yet another inmate. That’s when prison officials called him “The Meanest Man in Texas” in a radio broadcast and the prison chaplain said he was “a man without a soul.” This may have been ploy to finally land Thompson a seat in the electric chair. But failing to gain evidence to charge him with this murder, it was determined to place Thompson in the old morgue outside of death row that included only six concrete slabs where coffins had been placed.

After some months in the morgue, Thompson was given a Bible to read. He initially probed in the book to prove that people who believed it were fools. Failing at that, he later came to believe the Bible and started seeking God from his prison cell. He subsequently completed correspondence courses in Bible and journalism from Lee College in Baytown, Texas. He also wrote articles for religious publications.

He was removed from the old morgue in 1944 and placed in close-custody cellblocks in the Walls Unit and later at the Wynne Unit.

Just before Christmas, 1946, he received a Christmas card from a woman with whom he was not previously acquainted, Miss Julia Perryman of Meridian, Texas. The minister at her church knew of Thompson and encouraged members to send him a card. Julia was the only one who responded.

The two struck up a friendship via letter-writing. “You would never want to meet me in person,” she wrote in one of her letters. She went on to say that she had a severely misshapen spine due to scoliosis as child. “Some of the most beautiful people I’ve ever met were in handicapped bodies,” he responded.

As Christmas of 1947 approached, she drove to the prison and had their first face-to-face meeting. Toward the end of this visit, he proposed marriage. She accepted. From then on, she campaigned for his release from prison, even having a face-to-face meeting with O.B. Ellis, the reform-minded general manager of the Texas Department of Corrections.

Thompson was eligible for parole for the first time in 1949 and routinely denied. He was upgraded in status in early 1951 when he was removed from close confinement and sent to the Ramsey Farm in Rosharon (Brazoria County), Texas. He was again refused parole later that year and in 1953. Despite these rejections, Julia continued her letter-writing campaign to state and prison officials.

Thompson was finally awarded parole and released from prison on November 1, 1955. He and Julia married five days later. He and Julia worked for two years at Southwestern Christian College in Terrell, Texas, and he worked as a minister most of the time from 1957 to 1970. For nine months in 1960, Thompson served as the superintendent of the Manuelito Navajo Indian Children’s Home in Gallup, New Mexico. While there, they adopted Navajo infant, Shirley Anne.

Thompson enjoyed his greatest ministry success when helping prisoners and former prisoners. He summarized his story in a 52-page book, The Life Story of Clyde Thompson—Ex-83. (His execution number in the Texas electric chair was 83.) The book contained highlights of his life and poems he had written as a prisoner. It was estimated that the story reached 250,000 prisoners. Thompson was also a guest on the Chaplain Ray (Ray Hoekstra) radio program.

From 1970 to 1977 he operated the Prisoners Aid Center in Huntsville, Texas. Due to Julia’s respiratory problems, the Thompson family moved to Lubbock, Texas in 1977. where he served as the chaplain of the Lubbock County Jail until his death from a heart attack on July 1, 1979. Julia died a decade later. They are buried in Hillsboro, Texas.

Thompson’s biography, The Meanest Man in Texas, written by Don Umphrey, was originally published in 1984 by Thomas Nelson Publishers, Nashville, Tennessee and has been in print continuously since 2001 with Quarry Press, Dallas, Texas.
