= Sarah Marince =

American singer-songwriter

- Born: 1990 or 1991 (age 35–36)
- Origin: Moon Township, Pennsylvania, U.S.
- Occupations: TV-talent, model, entertainer, singer
- Years active: early 2000s–present
- Website: www.sarahmarince.com

Sarah Marince (born 1990) is an American TV-talent, model and entertainer from Moon Township, Pennsylvania. She started her career as a country singer in Pittsburgh and she self-released two country albums. Marince made her Billboard chart debut in 2010 when radio host Blair Garner played her song "In the Meantime".

Sarah Marince first stepped on stage at 13 in her hometown of Pittsburgh. She moved on to Nashville, where she earned opening slots with Taylor Swift, Kenny Chesney, Kellie Pickler, Kenny Rodgers and Pete Townsend. She has also performed alongside Martina McBride, Sara Evans and Sheryl Crow.

While in Nashville, Marince hit the country music charts with "In The Meantime", which charted on iTunes and Billboard. She followed that success with her single "Can't A Girl Change Her Mind."

She has sung the National Anthem for her hometown Pittsburgh Penguins, Steelers and Pirates as well as in the arenas of the Cleveland Cavaliers, the New York Knicks, the Mets, and the Los Angeles Clippers.

After relocating to Orlando, Marince began doing radio, television and voiceover work. She has done commercial work for Disney, Wal-Mart, Nestlé, Gaylord Palms Resort, Florida Hospital and modeling work for the NFL and MLB.

In 2016, Walt Disney World hired Marince to record voiceovers for the new Star Wars shows at Disney's Hollywood Studios. Her voice can also be heard on songs for Disney's Fireworks Spectaculars and Shows in their parks here in the US and overseas.

== Personal life ==
Marince resides in Orlando, Florida.

== Discography ==
=== Studio albums ===
Title	Album details
Somebody Like You	Release date: January 2008; Label: Gasoline Records

=== Extended plays ===
Title	Album details
You're My Summertime	Release date: 2008; Label: self-released

=== Singles ===
Year	Single	Peak positions
Year	Single	US Country
2010	"In the Meantime"	59

=== Music videos ===
Year	Video
2012	"Can I"
2012	"Can't a Girl Change Her Mind"
