= Relish (film) =

- Directed by: Justin Ward
- Written by: Justin Ward
- Produced by: Terry Nardozzi and Justin Ward
- Starring: Hana Hayes; Mateus Ward; Rio Mangini; Chelsea Zhang; Tyler DiChiara
- Cinematography: Will Barratt
- Edited by: Erik Swanson
- Release date: September 6, 2019 (Burbank)
- Running time: 97 minutes
- Country: United States
- Language: English

Relish is a 2019 American adventure comedy drama film written and directed by Justin Ward and starring Hana Hayes, Mateus Ward, Rio Mangini, Chelsea Zhang and Tyler DiChiara.

== Cast ==
- Tyler DiChiara as Kai
- Hana Hayes as Aspen
- Mateus Ward as Levi
- Rio Mangini as Theo
- Chelsea Zhang as Sawyer

== Release ==
The film premiered at the Burbank International Film Festival on September 6, 2019.

== Reception ==
Bradley Gibson of Film Threat rated the film an 8 out of 10 and wrote, "Justin Ward has crafted a beautiful, if derivative, tale of a particular right of passage for those staring down the barrel of adulthood in 2019."
