= Straley =

Straley is a surname. Notable people with the surname include:

- Bruce Straley, American game director, artist, and designer
- John Straley (born 1953), American poet and author of detective fiction
- Sam Straley, American actor

== See also ==
- Staley (surname)
