= Stale (disambiguation) =

Staling is a chemical and physical process in bread and similar foods that reduces their palatability.

Stale may also refer to:

- Ståle, a Norwegian surname
- Stale, Poland, a village in Gmina Grębów, Tarnobrzeg County, Subcarpathian Voivodeship, in south-eastern Poland
- Stale pointer bug, or aliasing bug, a class of programming error in dynamic memory allocation where a pointer designates deallocated memory

== See also ==
- Stalemate, a situation in the game of chess where the player whose turn it is to move is not in check but has no legal move
- Stalewo
- Staley (disambiguation)
- Stalled
- Staller
