= Ståle =

Ståle is a Norwegian male given name. Notable people with the name include:

- Ståle Dyrvik (born 1943), Norwegian historian
- Ståle Eskeland (born 1943), Norwegian jurist
- Ståle Kleiberg (born 1958), Norwegian composer and musicologist
- Ståle Kyllingstad (1903–1987), Norwegian sculptor and designer
- Ståle Petter Lyngstadaas, Norwegian researcher
- Ståle Økland (born 1976), Norwegian writer, trend expert and public speaker
- Ståle Steen Sæthre (born 1993), Norwegian footballer
- Ståle Sandbech (born 1993), Norwegian snowboarder
- Ståle Søbye (born 1971), Norwegian footballer who was a two time first team All American
- Ståle Solbakken (born 1968), Norwegian footballer and coach
- Ståle Stensaas (born 1971), Norwegian footballer and coach
- Ståle Storli, the title of a Norwegian folksong and a novel by John Lie, published in 1880
- Ståle Storløkken (born 1969), Norwegian jazz musician (keyboards, organ and piano) and composer

== See also ==
- Stale (disambiguation)
