= Coven of the Chicken Foot =

- Developer: Wildflower Interactive
- Publisher: Wildflower Interactive
- Director: Bruce Straley
- Platform: Windows
- Genre: Platformer
- Mode: Single-player

Coven of the Chicken Foot is an upcoming puzzle-platformer game being developed and published by Wildflower Interactive. Directed by Bruce Straley, the game follows an elderly witch and her familiar as she journeys to fulfil her oath to the titular coven. It is in development for Windows.

== Gameplay ==
The player controls Gertie, a witch in a fantasy world changed after the defeat of the monsters that used to roam the land. The environments are linked together in a semi-open world consisting of forests, dungeons, bogs and caves that the player can explore. Gertie has limited mobility and players need to rely on her familiar, who has various abilities to help traverse the world.

== Development ==
Bruce Straley departed Naughty Dog and took a break from video game development after the release of Uncharted 4: A Thief's End (2016). He wanted to experiment with his creations, which he found difficult at a studio like Naughty Dog. Straley was unsure if he wanted to continue making games; however, after thinking more about the medium, an "idea kept following [him]". He and some friends began prototyping, and eventually decided to create a studio, Wildflower Interactive, founded on March 11, 2021, and announced in July 2022. It is operating in a fully remote work environment with 16 employees, including 12 developers, as of 2025.

Wildflower announced its first game, Coven of the Chicken Foot, at the Game Awards 2025. Straley has cited his desire to both deconstruct the traditional hero's journey and to improve upon the companion system featured in The Last of Us (2013) as the main drivers behind the game. The familiar in the game is designed to mimic and react to the player's actions, learning how to perform certain actions along the way.
