= Staley (surname) =

Staley is a surname. Notable people with the surname include:

- Brandon Staley (born 1982), American football coach
- Braylon Staley (born 2006), American football player
- Cornelius Staley (1808–1883), American politician from Maryland
- Dawn Staley, American basketball player and coach
- Duce Staley, former professional American football player and current coach
- Edward Staley, former chairman of W. T. Grant; grandfather of Jes Staley
- Joan Staley, Playboy's "Miss November" 1958, movie and television actress and singer
- Jes Staley, banker, former CEO of Barclays plc and grandson of Edward Staley
- Joe Staley, professional American football player
- Jonathan Staley, English footballer
- Layne Staley (1967–2002), lead singer of Alice in Chains and Mad Season
- Luke Staley, former American professional football player
- Peter Staley, American political activist
- Steve Staley, American voice actor
- Thomas F. Staley (1935/36-2022), American literary scholar and librarian
- Thomas Nettleship Staley (1823–1898), first Anglican Bishop of Hawaii
- Tony Staley, former Australian politician
- Vernon Staley, Anglo-Catholic writer
- Staley Da Bear, official mascot of the Chicago Bears
