= Aslak Brekke =

Norwegian musician, vocalist (1901-1978)

Aslak Brekke (October 6, 1901 – February 13, 1978) was a prominent vocalist of one of the Scandinavian poetic genres that is referred to as stev. He was also well known as a folk music singer.

== Early life ==
He was born in Vinje Municipality, Telemark.

One way to describe his style of singing, might be to use his own words, that he recited the songs, to a greater degree, rather than straightforwardly singing them. Often he would follow the pulse of the song, with foot-tapping.

Aslak lived as a postman in his early years. It is said that he could be heard far off, as he was singing all the way while treading his bicycle. Eivind Groven was a childhood friend of him, and Eivind's wife Ragna recalled how he came to Groven farm in the late 1920s. Then he sang from the moment he arrived and all through the evening. His repertoire was almost incredible, Ragna recalled.

== Career ==
Musical/poetic career highlights include :

- he was the first folksinger to perform on a nationwide radio-broadcast, in Norway.
- his performance at the significant concert that was held 1945, in the ceremonial hall (the "Aula") at the University of Oslo.
- a unique recording of the song Ståle Storli, together with Eivind Groven (harmonium).

When Aslak Brekke was first broadcast on national radio, the more urban public reacted with scorn. They were not used to his way of singing, finding it crude and unlearned. Eivind Groven noted that the public might not be trained in the "old Norwegian tonal ways" as he put it. His voice and singing could be compared to Bob Dylan in his younger years.

Aslak Brekke and Eivind Groven met each other for the last time in the summer of 1976. Groven died the next winter, Brekke in 1978. Groven, ill from Parkinson's disease, approached, and Aslak exclaimed: "Eivind, are you still counted among the living?"

The two of them sat down and sang old ditties and songs all evening, to the delight of all involved.

The Norwegian/English edition of Aslak Brekke og visune hans, was released in 1983.
