= Lyngstadaas syndrome =

- Other names: Steroid dehydrogenase deficiency-dental anomalies syndrome
- This condition is inherited in an autosomal recessive manner.
- Frequency: 0.0001%

Lyngstadaas syndrome, also known as severe dental aberrations in familial steroid dehydrogenase deficiency, is a rare autosomal recessive liver disease involving an enzyme (steroid dehydrogenase) deficiency and dental anomalies. The disease is named after the Norwegian professor Ståle Petter Lyngstadaas.

== Cause ==
Lyngstadaas syndrome is an autosomal recessive liver disease.

== Epidemiology ==
Office of Rare Diseases listed Lyngstadaas syndrome as a "rare disease". This means that Lyngstadaas syndrome, or a subtype of Lyngstadaas syndrome, affects less than 200,000 people in the US population.

Orphanet, a consortium of European partners, currently defines a condition rare when if affects 1 person per 2,000. They list Lyngstadaas syndrome as a "rare disease".

== See also ==
- Rare disease
