= Generations Lost =

1994 video game

- North American box art
- Developer: Pacific Softscape
- Publisher: Time Warner Interactive
- Designer: Bruce Straley
- Platform: Sega Genesis
- Release: EU: November 1994; NA: December 1994
- Genre: Platform
- Mode: Single-player

Generations Lost is a 1994 platform game developed by Pacific Softscape and published by Time Warner Interactive for the Sega Genesis. Designer Bruce Straley described the game as a clone of the 1993 game X-Men (which he and other Pacific Softscape employees had worked on), after Pacific Softscape was unable to secure the rights to the X-Men franchise to develop a sequel.

== Plot ==
The player takes on the role of a young man named Monobe who is searching for the past of his people. Monobe has always wanted to know the origins and destiny of his people. He is told by his tribal elder of the stories of old and given a set of technologically sophisticated armor and an arm-mounted gauntlet that projects a strange energy. He leaves his people behind and wanders through jungles and temple areas. His devices allow him to navigate hazards and stop dangerous foes. Along the way he must use the gauntlet device to open doors and to access different areas of the landscape which become increasingly futuristic and industrial.

Monobe discovers that this "world" he and his people live on is not a planet but a generation ship sent from Earth (via Luna Colony) in May 2037. Its purpose was to colonize a world named "Hope", in an interstellar voyage that would put them in orbit around Hope in the year 2385. The ship, Heritage, was designed to support 20 generations of colonists. Monobe's discovery is made in August 2671; fortunately his ancestors built the ship to sustain life for at least 700 years. The breakdown of protocol on board the vessel throughout the many generations meant that key systems were not maintained and the automatic descent systems that would have brought the Heritage down safely on Hope were not engaged so that the ship stayed in orbit for more than 200 years after arrival, with its occupants unaware that they needed to disembark on shuttles to the planet below.

== Gameplay ==
Monobe is equipped with an arm-mounted device called an "e-rad" and what is believed to be magic armor. These devices allow Monobe to project energy bolts and create energy ropes to swing on, in addition to basic fighting skills, running, jumping, and rolling.

== Reception ==
GamePro commented that "Fans of Flashback or Blackthorne will immediately recognize and breeze through this game. Generations Lost should have been called Imagination Lost." They also complained of several minor issues, such as the player character's stiff movements, the generic music, and the lack of bosses. Electronic Gaming Monthly gave the game a 6.4 out of 10. Though they complained of somewhat imprecise controls and choppy scrolling, they concluded that "If you liked games like Out of This World and Black Thorne [sic], then this will definitely appeal."

== See also ==
- Interstellar ark
- The Sacred Armour of Antiriad
- The Starlost
- Pandorum
