= Staley =

== People ==
- Staley (surname)

== Places ==
- Staley, North Carolina
- Stalybridge, Greater Manchester, England; where the mediaeval manor of Staley forms part of the town

== Schools ==
- A. S. Staley High School in Americus, Georgia, U.S.
- Staley High School in Kansas City, Missouri, U.S.

== Other ==
- A. E. Staley, a processor of corn located in Decatur, Illinois, and now part of Tate & Lyle, PLC
- The Chicago Bears, formerly Decatur Staleys, a football club established by the A. E. Staley Company
- Staley Da Bear, mascot of the Chicago Bears, named after the A. E. Staley Company
