= Uncharted 4: A Thief's End =

2016 video game

- Developer: Naughty Dog (Note: Ported to Windows by Iron Galaxy)
- Publisher: Sony Computer Entertainment (Note: PlayStation 5 and Windows versions released under the publisher's new name, Sony Interactive Entertainment)
- Directors: Bruce Straley; Neil Druckmann
- Designers: Kurt Margenau; Emilia Schatz; Anthony Newman; Richard Cambier
- Programmers: Christian Gyrling; Sandeep Shekar; Vincent Marxen; Travis McIntosh; Jason Gregory
- Artists: Robh Ruppel; Erick Pangilinan; Tate Mosesian
- Writers: Neil Druckmann; Josh Scherr
- Composer: Henry Jackman
- Series: Uncharted
- Platforms: PlayStation 4; PlayStation 5; Windows
- Release: PlayStation 4; May 10, 2016; PlayStation 5; January 28, 2022; Windows; October 19, 2022
- Genre: Action-adventure
- Modes: Single-player, multiplayer (Note: The online multiplayer mode is only available on the PlayStation 4 version; it was omitted from the PlayStation 5 and Windows versions.)

Uncharted 4: A Thief's End is a 2016 action-adventure game developed by Naughty Dog and published by Sony Computer Entertainment. It is the fourth main entry in the Uncharted series. Set several years after the events of Uncharted 3: Drake's Deception, players control Nathan Drake, a former treasure hunter coaxed out of retirement by his presumed-dead brother Samuel. With Nathan's longtime partner, Victor Sullivan, they search for clues to the location of Henry Avery's long-lost treasure. A Thief's End is played from a third-person perspective and incorporates platformer elements. Players solve puzzles and use firearms, melee combat, and stealth to combat enemies. In the online multiplayer mode, up to ten players engage in co-operative and competitive modes.

Development of Uncharted 4 began in 2011, soon after the release of Uncharted 3. It was led by creative director Amy Hennig and game director Justin Richmond. Development was hampered in 2014 due to Hennig and Richmond's departure from Naughty Dog; they were replaced by Neil Druckmann and Bruce Straley. The team sought to incorporate elements of open-world gameplay, with larger levels to encourage free-roaming exploration and combat. The relationship between Nathan and Elena was central, and Naughty Dog attempted to humanize them more than in previous games. A Thief's End was Naughty Dog's first game developed specifically for the PlayStation 4; the team took advantage of the hardware to process larger dynamic environments.

A Thief's End was released in May 2016 to acclaim for its gameplay, narrative, emotional depth, visuals, and multiplayer, with several reviewers finding the game a worthy conclusion to Nathan's story. It won year-end accolades, including Game of the Year awards from several gaming publications, critics, and award ceremonies, and it is considered among the greatest video games ever made. With over 18 million copies sold, it is the highest-selling Uncharted game and one of the best-selling PlayStation 4 games. A standalone expansion, Uncharted: The Lost Legacy, was released in 2017. A remastered version was released as part of Uncharted: Legacy of Thieves Collection for the PlayStation 5 and Windows in 2022.

== Gameplay ==
Uncharted 4: A Thief's End is an action-adventure game played from a third-person perspective. Players traverse several environments via platforming, moving through locations including towns, buildings, and wilderness to advance through the story. They use firearms, melee combat, and stealth to combat hostile enemies. For most of the game, players control Nathan Drake—a treasure hunter who is physically adept and can jump, sprint, climb, swim, scale narrow ledges and walls, swing with a rope, use a grappling hook and perform other acrobatic actions. Vehicles are driven during some gameplay segments.

Gameplay in Uncharted 4 emphasizes the ability to defeat hostile enemies by using stealth tactics, including hiding in tall grass and sneaking undetected, as well as the use of the grappling hook to quickly traverse environments. (0:20)

In combat, players can use long-ranged weapons such as rifles and shotguns, short-barreled guns including pistols and revolvers, and handheld explosives like grenades and dynamite. The melee combat system was reworked to avoid the presence of quick time events. The grappling hook allows players to leap over gaps, often giving them a tactical advantage in combat. Players can attack enemies directly or use stealth tactics to attack undetected or sneak by them. While the game is linear, environments feature multiple paths for players to explore; maps are significantly larger than earlier entries in the series.

The game features an artificial intelligence system in which hostile enemies react to any combat situation they are placed in; they respond to players' actions, coordinate tactics, and cooperate with each other. Players' companions are also controlled by artificial intelligence. The game introduces a dialogue tree, allowing players to decide the outcome of some conversations, though it does not affect the story's progression. Extra visual filters and modes, such as a zero-gravity mode, bullet time gameplay, and a cel-shaded art style, can be unlocked by using points players collected in the main game.

=== Multiplayer ===
The online multiplayer allows up to ten players to engage in competitive gameplay in recreations of multiple single-player settings. Players control different characters from the series, and are tasked to defeat their opponents. The game features five multiplayer game types: Command, in which players capture sites to attain points; Ranked and Team Deathmatch, which are deathmatch game types where players kill their opponents; Plunder, a capture the flag game mode in which players seek the idol; and Trials, where players cooperate to defeat non-player characters. Treasures can be found in all maps, which can be used to purchase items and weapons.

Multiplayer features "Mysticals"—supernatural power-ups that boost players' ability. For example, the "Wrath of El Dorado" damages all opponents standing next to it, while the "Cintamani Stone" can heal both players and their teammates. Companions, known as Sidekicks, can be summoned to assist players, and have different functions: Hunters immobilize their closest opponent for an easier kill, Saviors provide medical support and ammunition to players, Snipers defend locations with a sniper rifle, and Brutes attack enemies using a heavy machine gun. A cooperative survival mode, released in December 2016, features three players fighting against waves of enemies that continually increase in difficulty.

== Synopsis ==
=== Characters ===
The main character of Uncharted 4: A Thief's End is Nathan "Nate" Drake (Nolan North), a veteran adventurer and explorer. Following the events of Uncharted 3: Drake's Deception (2011), he has retired from fortune hunting alongside his wife Elena Fisher (Emily Rose), a journalist, to a more normal life, and taken up employment with a salvage company in New Orleans. The game introduces Samuel "Sam" Drake (Troy Baker), Nate's older brother, who was presumed dead. Drawn back into his old life of adventure by his brother, Nathan is aided by his longtime friend, fellow adventurer, mentor, and father figure Victor "Sully" Sullivan (Richard McGonagle). Their journey to find and recover the long-lost treasure of pirate Henry Avery brings them into conflict with wealthy and dangerous businessman and treasure hunter Rafe Adler (Warren Kole), his partner Nadine Ross (Laura Bailey) who runs the private military company Shoreline, and drug lord Hector Alcazar (Robin Atkin Downes). The child versions of Nate and Sam are portrayed by Britain Dalton and Chase Austin, respectively.

=== Plot ===
Several years before the events of the first game, Nate and Sam hunt for Avery's treasure. Alongside Rafe, the Drake brothers infiltrate a Panamanian jail to access the former cell of Avery's first mate, where Nate discovers a hollow St. Dismas idol. When the prison warden who aided them demands a cut, Rafe impulsively kills him, triggering a frantic escape. Nate and Rafe successfully escape, but Sam is shot by guards and presumed dead.

Fifteen years later, following the events of the previous game, Nate has retired in New Orleans with Elena but misses the excitement of his adventuring life. He is visited by Sam, who survived the gunshots and has spent the intervening time incarcerated. He explains that he escaped with drug lord Hector Alcazar, who demands that Sam find Avery's treasure or be killed. Nate agrees to help Sam, lying to Elena that he has accepted a salvaging job. Aided by Sully, the Drakes steal a duplicate Dismas idol from an illegal auction in Italy, bringing them into conflict with Nadine and her employer, Rafe, who is still searching for Avery's treasure. A map inside the idol leads the Drakes to St. Dismas's cathedral in the Scottish Highlands, where they discover a hidden temple and a map highlighting King's Bay in Madagascar.

In King's Bay, the Drakes and Sully learn that Avery, Thomas Tew, and ten other pirate captains pooled their treasures. Nate uncovers a map to Libertalia, a fabled pirate utopia. The group return to their hotel to find Elena. Upset at Nate's deception and the appearance of Sam, whom Nate had never mentioned, Elena leaves. Nate sends Sully after her. The Drakes follow the map to an island and discover Libertalia. They find evidence of a civil war; the founders stole the city's treasure and moved it across the island to New Devon, an extravagant and well-fortified town built for them. The brothers are cornered by Rafe, who reveals Sam lied: Alcazar died six months ago; Rafe released Sam from prison two years ago and Sam had actually double-crossed Rafe to resume searching with Nate. Rafe prepares to shoot Nate; Sam shields him, inadvertently knocking Nate off a cliff.

Elena rescues Nate, who reveals his past: as teenagers, he and Sam discovered that their mother, a historian named Cassandra Morgan, was researching Libertalia. The boys, after breaking into the house of the person associated with their mother and nearly being caught by police, decided to start new lives by changing their surname to Drake to honor their mother's theory about Francis Drake's descendants. In New Devon, Nate and Elena learn that Libertalia descended into conflict over the treasure, with the founders killing all the colonists. In-fighting between the founders began, until they were all poisoned by Avery and Tew.

The group rescue Sam and convinces him to escape with them, but he decides to pursue the treasure instead. Following Sam's trail, Nate finds Avery's treasure-laden ship in a cavern. Having collected a large amount of treasure, Nadine refuses to risk more of Avery's traps, but Rafe coerces her by bribing her men. Aboard the ship, Sam triggers a trap, starting a fire and pinning him beneath rubble. Nate confronts Rafe and Nadine in the ship hold, where the skeletons of Avery and Tew lie, having killed each other over the treasure. Fed up with Rafe's obsession, Nadine leaves him with Nate and Sam to die. Enraged, Rafe challenges Nate to a sword fight. Nate cuts a rope attached to a bundle of treasure, causing it to crush Rafe to death, and rescues Sam. The pair return to Sully's plane and the group escapes.

Sam and Sully team up for a new job while Nate and Elena return home. Elena explains that Sam pocketed some of the gold and gave it to her. Realizing they both need adventure in their lives, she buys the salvage company for which Nate worked, installing Nate as the owner, and plans to revive her old exploration show. Years later, Nate and Elena have become successful salvagers and archaeologists. After their teenage daughter Cassie (Kaitlyn Dever) discovers relics from their adventures, Nate decides to tell her their story.

== Development ==
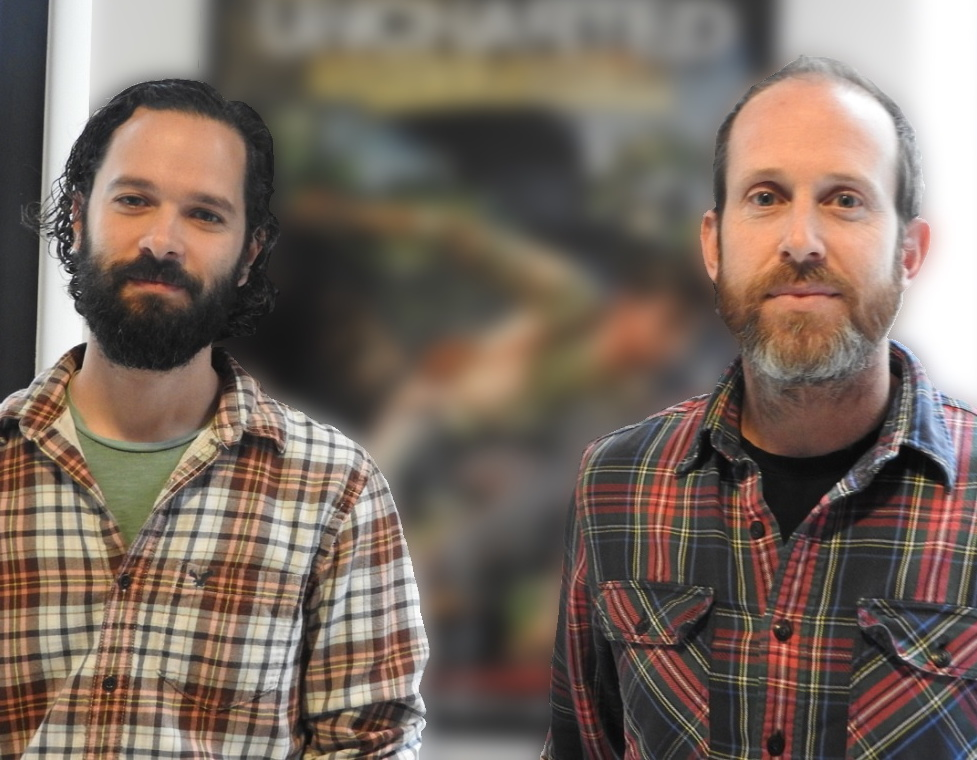
Neil Druckmann (left) and Bruce Straley (right) were chosen to lead development on Uncharted 4 as game director and creative director, replacing Justin Richmond and Amy Hennig, respectively.

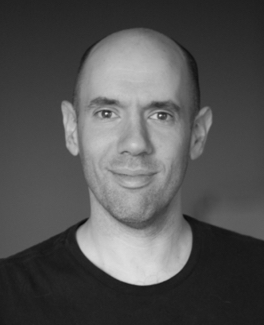
Josh Scherr

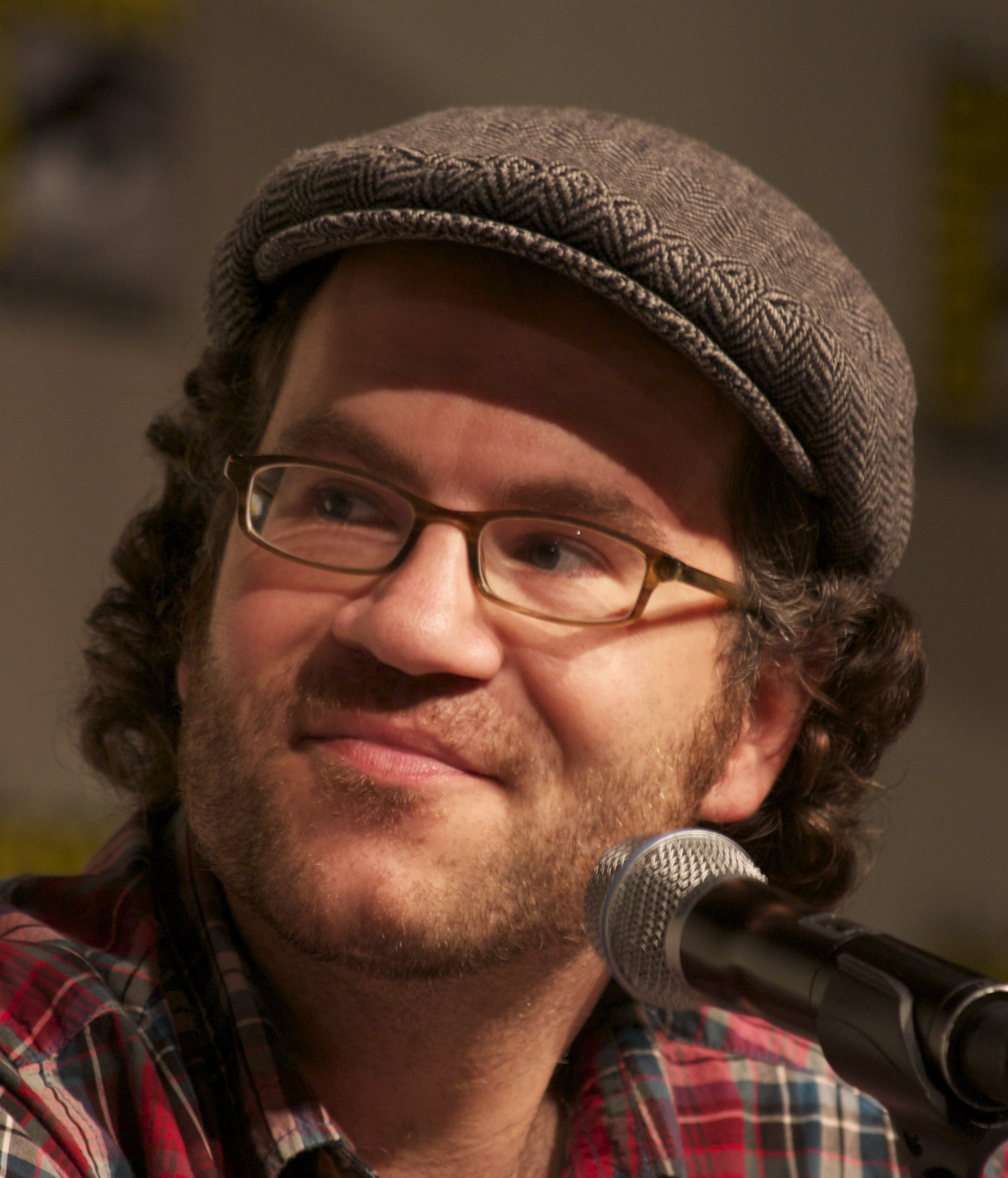
Tom Bissell

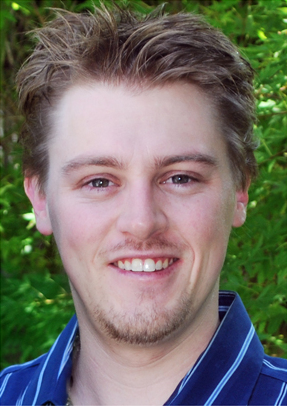
Ryan James

Scherr co-wrote the story of Uncharted 4 alongside Druckmann, while Bissell and James provided additional writing.

Developer Naughty Dog split into two teams in 2009, to develop Uncharted 3: Drake's Deception and The Last of Us concurrently; the former team, led by creative director Amy Hennig and game director Justin Richmond, began preliminary work on Uncharted 4: A Thief's End after the release of Uncharted 3 in November 2011. Hennig and Richmond led development for several years, until their departure from the company in March 2014. Shortly after, Neil Druckmann and Bruce Straley were working on the game as creative director and game director, respectively; Druckmann and Straley had previously led the development of The Last of Us.

Initial reports claimed that Hennig was "forced out" of Naughty Dog by Druckmann and Straley, though co-presidents Evan Wells and Christophe Balestra later denied this. After taking over development, Druckmann and Straley scrapped about "eight months of [Hennig's] story". They became committed to making Uncharted 4 the final game in the series, as there was "nowhere else" to take the characters. They faced great difficulty after Hennig's departure, due to the more limited development time and significant story changes.

An extended crunch schedule of 12-hour and up working days toward the end of development of Uncharted 4 caused significant attrition at Naughty Dog, according to a report by Kotaku's Jason Schreier. 14 out of 20 non-lead designers credited in Uncharted 4 left the company after the game was released, the departure of 70% of the team. Straley was quoted as saying that he "would never want to do Uncharted 4 again... Because now we've lived through that". Straley also left the company shortly after release, following a sabbatical. Schreier suggested that the development of Naughty Dog's next project, The Last of Us Part II (2020), was adversely affected and slowed due to the enormous turnover of employees, with few veterans left on the team.

=== Narrative and art design ===
The game was written with a dialogue designer, in which several lines are inputted depending on the player's activity. The production process began with a story outline, describing the major events and beats, before becoming a process where writers and game designers collaborate, regularly rewriting scenes to fit the gameplay sequences. The ability to participate in optional conversations with non-player characters in The Last of Us was used in Uncharted 4 for players who wish to engage with the story. The game also features several dialogue trees, first used by Naughty Dog in The Last of Us: Left Behind (2014), to position players in the same mindset as Nathan. Despite adding some freedom and player decisions, the writers wanted to tell a story with specific emotional moments.

Druckmann wrote the story with Josh Scherr, who, as the "funny one", wrote the humor. Druckmann appreciated the collaboration, having written The Last of Us mostly independently. Tom Bissell and Ryan M. James provided additional writing, contributing to historical research and companion, enemy, and multiplayer dialogue. The writers wanted the "lighthearted drama" to "tell a meaningful human story with complex relationships". The narrative pacing was seen as a benchmark for several environments and gameplay beats. It explores the idea that "every treasure has a cost" and the extent to which one would go to save their loved ones, as well as the theme of family, both surrogate and blood. The outcome of Avery and Tew's search was a message of the destruction caused by greed and obsession. The team felt the game's subtitle—A Thief's End—applied to several characters, including Rafe and the pirates. The team constructed the ending early in development, and the epilogue was added to ensure a definitive conclusion, instead of leaving players with questions. Straley found the resolution "satisfying" and "right for the franchise".

The team redesigned Nathan to look like an adventurer, seeking inspiration from characters like Indiana Jones. The team aimed for subtlety with Nathan's equipment, including his holster and pouch, ensuring they do not "steal the scene". Straley regularly worked with designers to craft the environmental architecture and with concept artists to determine the world's coloring and shapes. Several downbeats in the story are contrasted by bright colors; Straley wanted players to feel the juxtaposition. User interface designer Alexandria Neonakis was tasked with designing both Nathan's orphanage and Cassie's bedroom in Uncharted 4, placed at the beginning and end of the game, respectively. She worked with Druckmann to establish their lighting and dressing. They were designed to contrast each other to represent their different upbringings: Nathan's room is stark and empty, while Cassie's has soft lighting and is full of posters and childhood items.

=== Character development ===
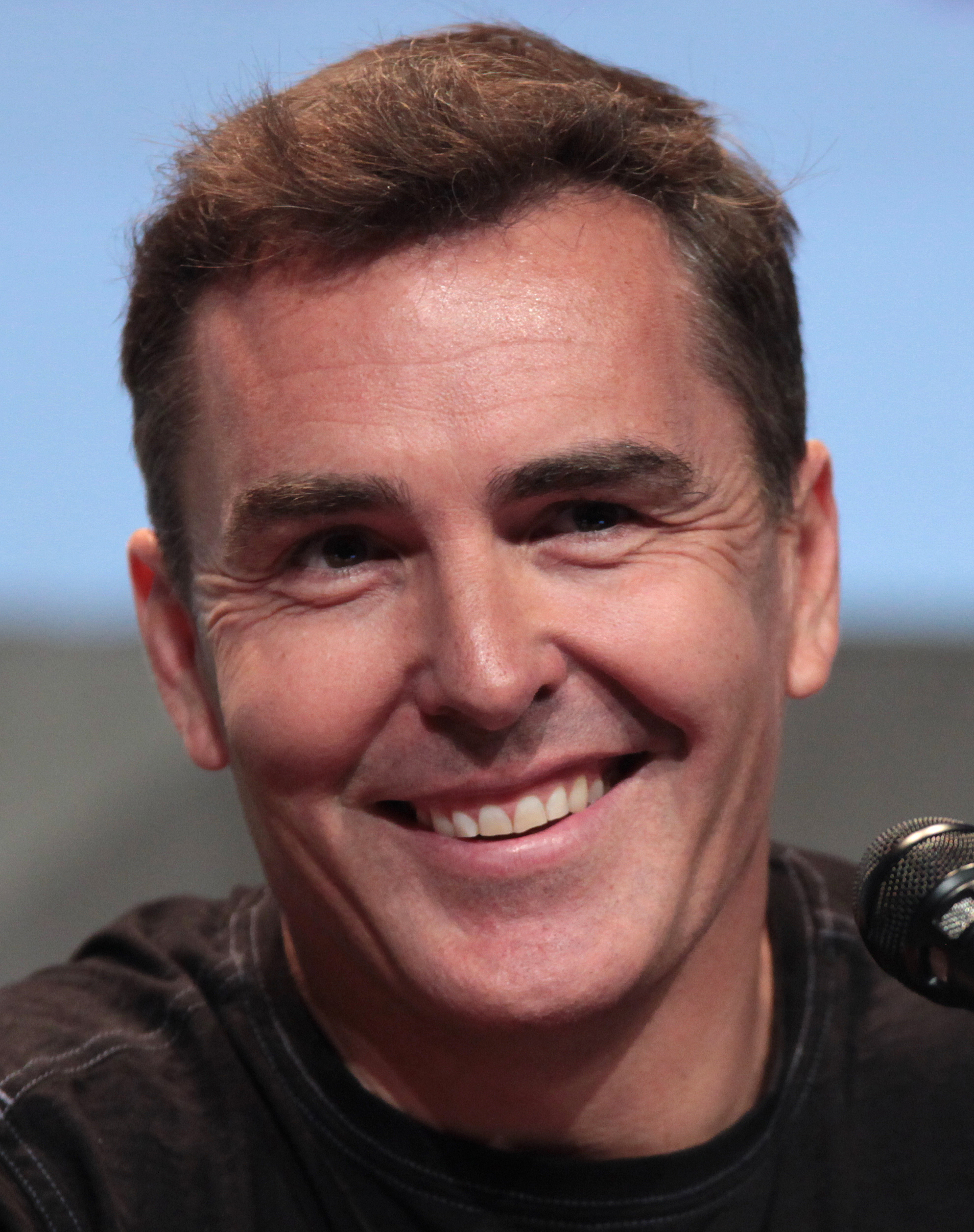
Nolan North

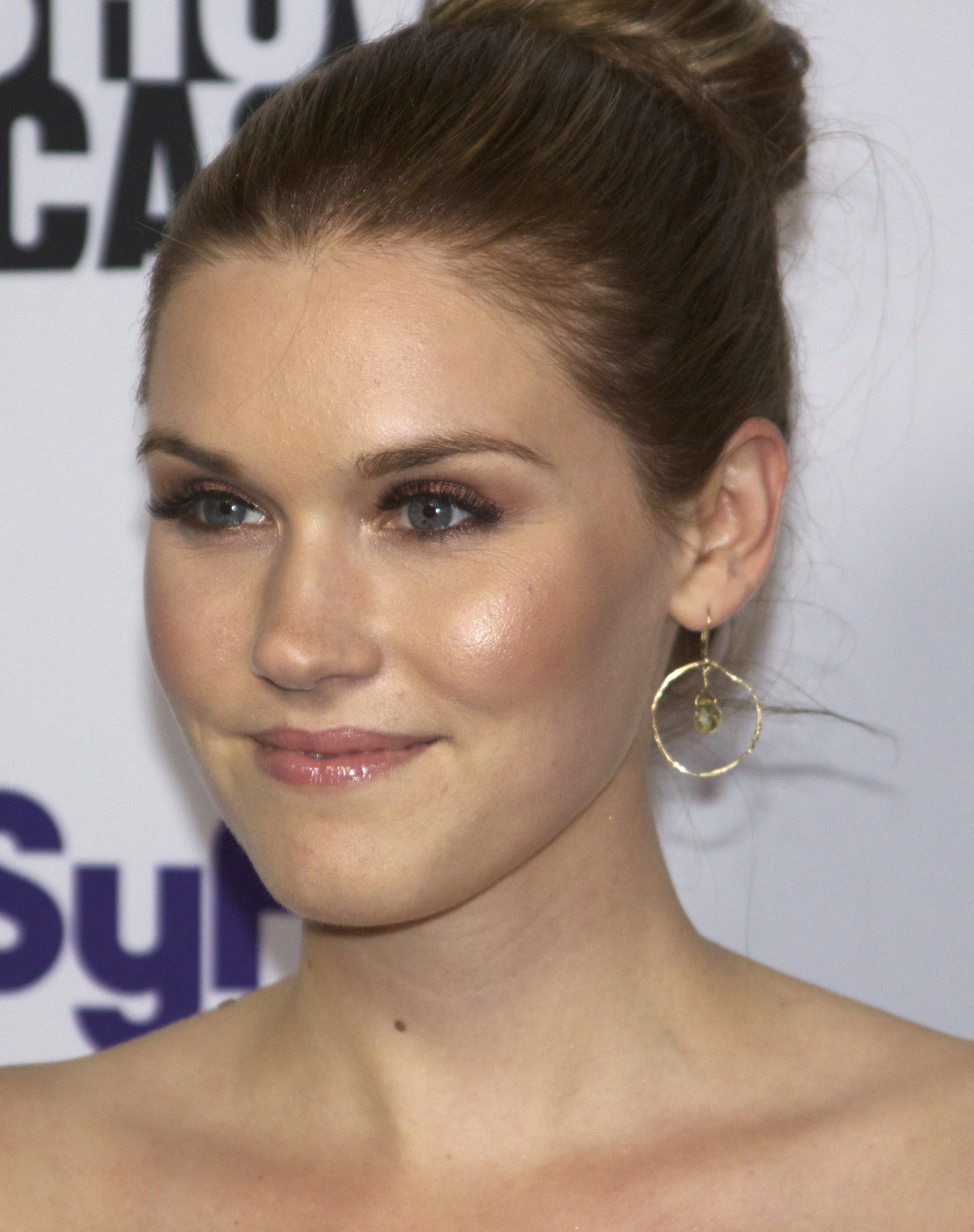
Emily Rose

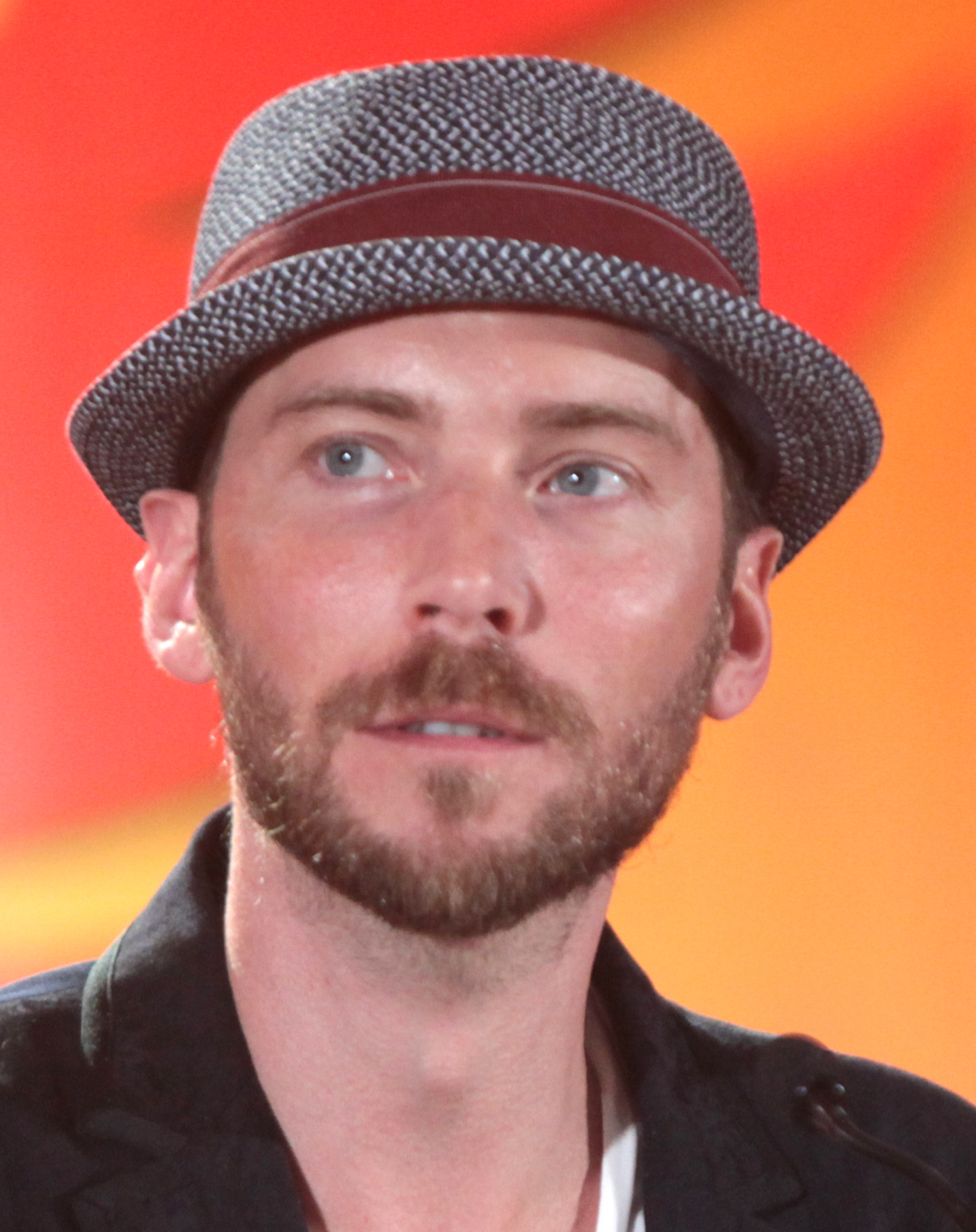
Troy Baker

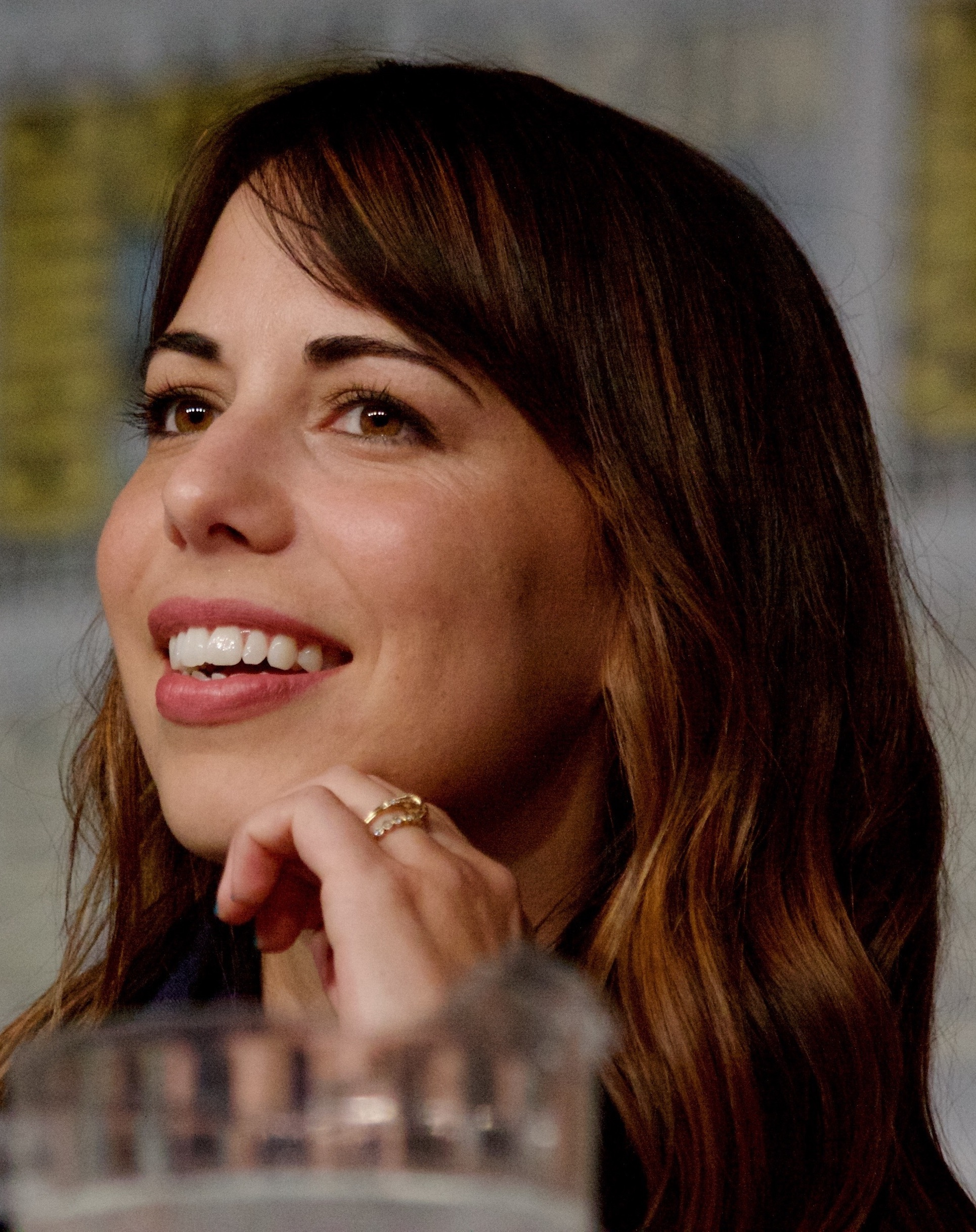
Laura Bailey

North and Rose reprised their roles as Nathan Drake and Elena Fisher, while Baker and Bailey were cast as Sam Drake and Nadine Ross, respectively.

Nolan North, Emily Rose, and Richard McGonagle reprised their roles as Nathan, Elena, and Sully, respectively. Their performances were mostly recorded using performance capture technology, with remaining audio elements recorded later in a studio. The relationship between Nathan and Elena was a central focus of development as the team attempted to humanize Nathan more than previous games. When Elena accompanies Nathan later in the game, the team found it necessary to "create a closer bond" by removing the vehicle, forcing players to traverse on foot. In developing Nathan, the team wanted players to become conflicted between his relationship with Elena and the hunt for pirate treasure. They considered him a reflection of their own mentalities: as they have grown older and matured, Nathan has also matured in age and wisdom. North found that aging Nathan due to the advancement of technology humanized him. McGonagle compared Nathan in Uncharted 4 to Sully in previous games: both consider themselves too old for treasure hunting.

Druckmann described Elena as "a very strong person who loves [Nathan] very much", ultimately encouraging her decision to return to him. When she witnesses Nathan's excitement regarding his discovery of the pirate captains, she "gets to see [him] as the adventurer she loves" and realizes it is "what was missing" for them as a couple. The scene in which Nathan and Elena become trapped in a net was a metaphor for the two being drawn closer together, cooperating to escape before reconciling over a humorous situation. Straley found Uncharted 4 allowed Nathan to discover his motivation and to become vulnerable and trust another person in his life; events in his early life led him to develop a sarcastic attitude as a defense mechanism, which begins to diminish after receiving Elena's love and trust. Druckmann felt the story questioned the possibility to "balance passion versus settling down", referencing the effects of crunch on the developers' lives.

The actors regularly contributed to the development of the characters; Druckmann found the actors were more familiar with the character motivations, and took their advice while writing. Throughout the series, North tried to portray Nathan as a regular guy, as opposed to an "action star". In Uncharted 4, he found the older ages of the characters allowed players to identify with them more closely, recognizing their struggles and establishing a connection with their own. The team wanted to place characters in uncomfortable situations, wherein the pressure of conflict propels them to discover new things. The team found the assistance given by non-player character allies during combat assisted in the story and character development. Straley wanted to explore character relationships deeper than previous Uncharted games, taking inspiration from the story of The Last of Us. Some characters were reworked and recast after Hennig and Richmond's departure. Alan Tudyk, who was cast as Rafe, left the project due to the narrative changes, replaced by Warren Kole. Todd Stashwick was originally cast as Sam, and was involved in the development for at least six months before departing in April 2014, replaced by Troy Baker. Graham McTavish was set to return as Charlie Cutter before the character was cut.

Troy Baker met with Druckmann and Scherr to discuss portraying Sam, who is older than Nathan, despite Baker being younger than North. Baker compared the relationship to his own friendship with actor Travis Willingham; despite Willingham's younger age, his life experiences have led Baker to look up to him. Baker's pre-existing playful relationship with North eased his portrayal as he felt like he was playing himself. He and North found there was a sibling rivalry between the brothers as they attempted to outsmart each other. North recalled difficulty in portraying the frequent animosity due to his close relationship with Baker, though found the "brotherly love" easy to play. Sam was developed to expose the feeling of Nathan's "worthiness", encouraging him to adventure. The team added the flashback sequences to demonstrate Nathan's intrigue for adventure and Sam's care for Nathan. Since the development of Uncharted: Drake's Fortune (2007), the team regularly considered exploring Nathan's family history—several characters were considered, including Nathan's father—but did not do so until Uncharted 4. Druckmann viewed Sam as a past version of Nathan, before the latter married Elena and quit treasure hunting. Druckmann said "it's a way for [Nathan] to reflect and see what he was and why it's so important to mature and change". He felt it allowed a deeper exploration of the character's evolution throughout the series.

The announcement of Laura Bailey, a white actress, portraying the character of Nadine Ross, who is of Black South African descent, led to some backlash. Druckmann explained the character's ethnicity was not yet determined when she was conceived; Bailey was chosen from the audition of casting calls from actors of several heritages. Druckmann also noted a Caucasian character in the game was voiced by a black voice actor. Concept artist Ashley Swidowski created the look of Nadine; Druckmann's curly hair was used as reference for Nadine's. Straley found the inclusion of Nadine allowed the team to "pull out different dimensions" of Rafe due to her differing viewpoint on the treasure: while Nadine is interested in the monetary value of the treasure, Rafe has a more personal attachment to the discovery, eventually leading him to lash out against Nadine and Nathan. Druckmann considered Rafe to be a reflection of Nathan's ego. When writing scenes featuring Nadine or Rafe, Druckmann felt they "don't see themselves as antagonist", stating he "[wrote] with a clear motivation and clear objectives" and not as clichés.

The character of Evelyn, portrayed by Merle Dandridge, became obsessed with traveling and hunting treasure, resulting in her family life diminishing; this was developed to parallel Nathan and Sam, and the outcome of pursuing treasure throughout their lives. Evelyn's character was originally an old English man. Throughout development, Druckmann was influenced by Swidowski to include more female characters in the game. He said "she is constantly challenging me and pushing for diversity in our cast". Druckmann admitted his development of the story was influenced by Anita Sarkeesian, a prominent feminist critic of gaming. Among the influences of Sarkeesian were switching the gender of Drake's child (originally a son) to be female and changing the outcome of conflicts so women would win more frequently to be seen as powerful and independent. Upon a focus tester's criticism regarding these changes, Druckmann instructed him to leave, responding "Wow, why does that matter?"

=== Technical and gameplay development ===
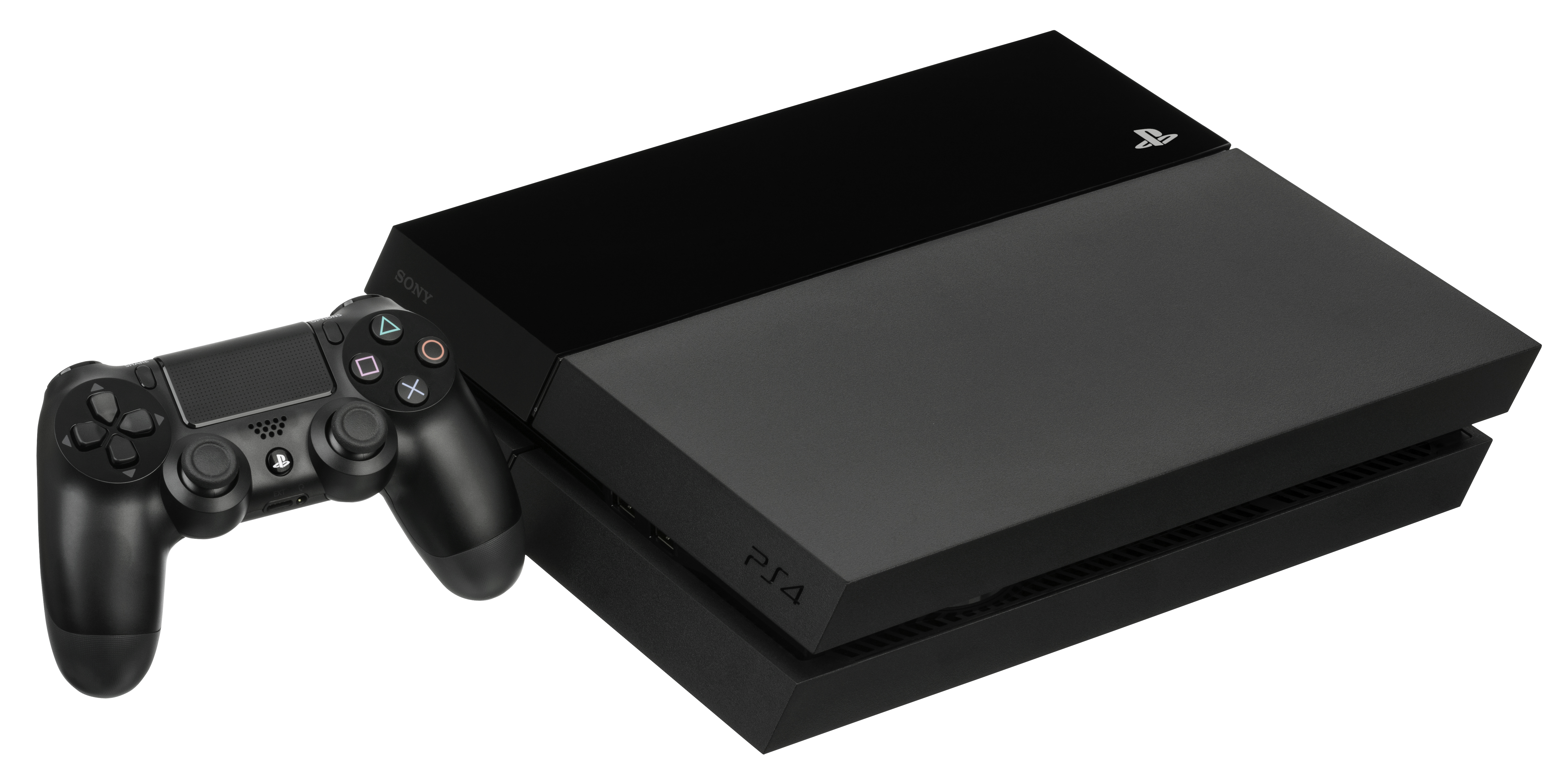
Uncharted 4 was Naughty Dog's first game developed for the PlayStation 4. The development team took advantage of the advanced hardware to process larger dynamic environments.

Uncharted 4 was Naughty Dog's first original game developed for the PlayStation 4. Remastering The Last of Us for the console in 2014 allowed the team to become accustomed to its architecture, having previously struggling switching from PlayStation 2 to PlayStation 3 for Drake's Fortune. The hardware allowed additional details and a more dynamic environment; Druckmann felt the technology was driving their creativity rather than limiting their decisions. The texture resolution is at least four times larger than Uncharted 3's, while a physically based rendering pipeline is used for the first time to more accurately emulate lifelike materials with dimensionality as opposed to flat textures. Parallax occlusion maps are used to exhibit depth on materials like bricks and roof tiles. Reflections are handled via a mix of pre-calculated cube maps and screen-space techniques. A pre-calculated global illumination system allows light to dynamically cast shadows across scenes while skin shading on character faces makes use of subsurface scattering.

While the team initially aimed for the entire game to run at 60 frames per second (FPS), restrictions in the environment limited the single-player mode to 30 FPS at 1080p resolution on PlayStation 4; the multiplayer mode runs at 60 FPS. The game received enhancement for the PlayStation 4 Pro in November 2016, allowing it to run at a higher 1440p resolution. Uncharted 4 uses its own bespoke upscaling solution, rather than using checkerboard rendering like other PlayStation 4 Pro games as it needs additional system resources and the game engine requires awareness of single-frame effect limitations due to how checkerboard rendering uses data from previous frames. For the PlayStation 5 release, the game received resolution and frame rate boosts, with up to three options depending on the connected display: a native 4K resolution at 30 FPS in quality mode; 1440p at 60 FPS in performance mode; and 1080p targeting 120 FPS in "performance plus". A September 2022 update enabled variable refresh rate support on 120Hz displays, running at an unlocked frame rate of up to 50 FPS in quality mode or 90–110 FPS in performance mode.

Uncharted 4 saw upgrades in animation quality and fidelity. It was Naughty Dog's first game to capture facial performances with head mounted cameras and facial markings. Character faces in Uncharted 4 are capable of over 850 possible expressions compared to 120 in Uncharted 3. In previous games, Nathan Drake's body skeleton consisted of 250 bones; in Uncharted 4, his face alone consists of 800 bones. The team found the fidelity of the technology allowed close-up shots of the characters' faces to show emotion during cutscenes, demonstrating subtleties such as wrinkles and skin pores. The move to running cutscenes in real-time rather than using pre-rendered video files enables seamless transitions between gameplay and cinematics.

The team tried to "add dimension and complexity" to the climbing and traversal systems by including more problem-solving elements which did not interrupt the pacing of the narrative. The game world was also significantly increased from earlier entries in the series; technical art director Teagan Morrison estimated the game features "maybe ten times the size ... of explorable space". A larger area allowed the team to create several paths for players to follow in order to complete objectives, though they faced difficulty in ensuring players remained focused on the overall goal of the area. Druckmann described the game as "wide-linear", noting "it's not open-world, because we wanted to tell a very specific story, with very specific tension". He felt open world games often lack tension because players possess the freedom to lose focus on the main objective; Druckmann prefers to "control the pacing". The team's interest in featuring Crash Bandicoot (1996) in the game was initially met with legal disapproval; they began working on a "different old-school game" in its place, until negotiations were made to include Crash Bandicoot.

=== Music and sound production ===
The original score was written by Henry Jackman, with additional music by Alex Belcher, replacing former series composer Greg Edmonson. The score was co-produced by Jackman and Sony's senior music manager Jonathan Mayer, and was recorded with an orchestra at AIR Studios in London. The official soundtrack was released digitally on iTunes, Amazon Music, and Google Play Music alongside the game's launch on May 10, 2016, physically on vinyl by iam8bit on May 12, and on CD by La-La Land Records on May 17.

The game features about 55,000 lines of recorded dialogue, and its cinematics run for approximately 165 minutes. For the environment sounds, the team performed outdoor recording; they ensured the environments "felt alive but not overbuilt" by introducing several ambient changes as players progress through the locations. Audio lead Phillip Kovats said "it's not a very static world at all ... the emotion is built up within the ambience". The sound changes in respect to the background foliage; for example, when players walk through a bush, the sound may vary depending on their speed and the type of bush. The variation of in-game locations introduced challenges as the team sought to make each location different, wanting players to feel like "they were being propelled to different locations across the world". The game uses quadraphonic sound, which senior sound designer Jeremy Rogers described as more "intricate" than previous games, due to availability of memory.

The team found the sound design of the in-game Jeep challenging. They traveled to California and Nevada, where they recorded sounds of a Jeep traversing through terrain. They also recorded the sound of tires on several surfaces at a foley recording stage. Each tire of the Jeep interacts separately with a surface, dependent on elements such as the type of surface and pressure of the tire, thereby allowing several simultaneous sounds during gameplay. Each sound effect in the game has metadata instructing the engine to play the sound in a specific manner. When designing the sounds of the grappling hook, Rogers recorded the sounds of a bullwhip crafted by David Morgan, responsible for the bullwhips used in the Indiana Jones franchise; he considered the sounds to be an homage to the franchise.

== Release ==
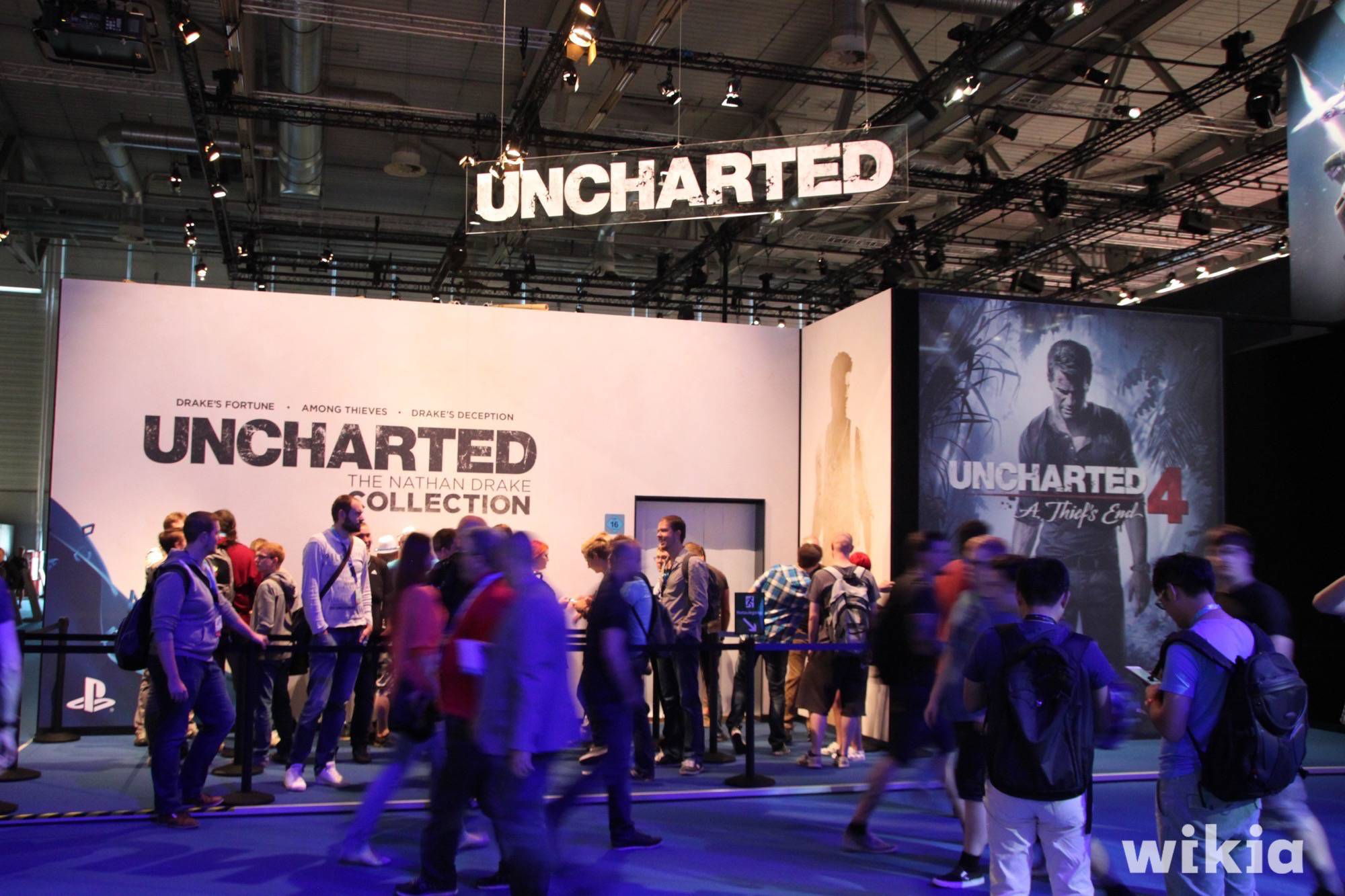
Gamescom 2015

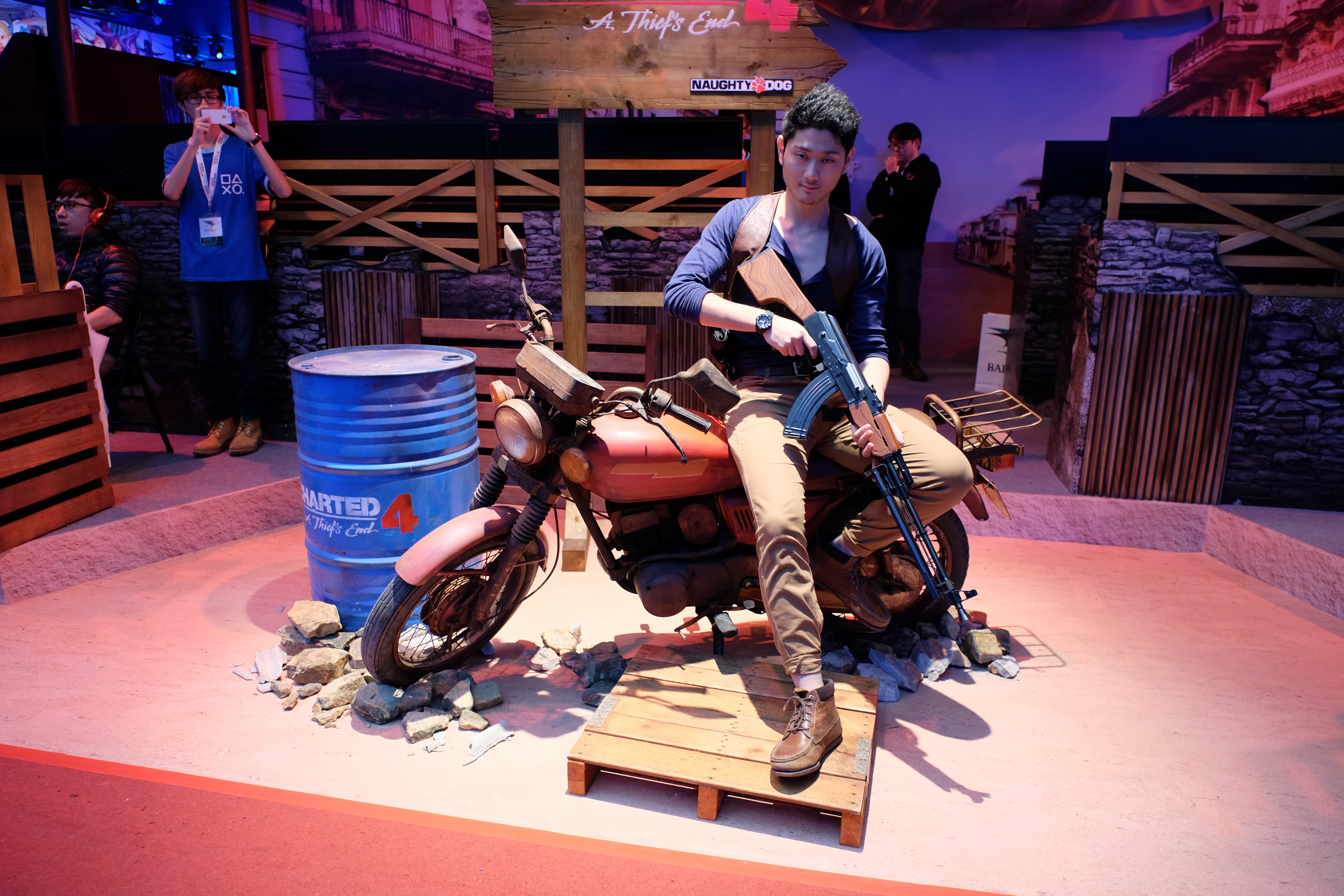
2016 Taipei Game Show

Uncharted 4 was marketed at several gaming events and conventions.

Journalists speculated about Uncharted 4's development before its announcement, citing job listings at Naughty Dog and apparent leaks from retailers. The existence of a new entry in the Uncharted series was officially acknowledged by Sony on November 14, 2013, with the release of an official trailer. The full title was unveiled on June 9 at Sony's E3 2014 press conference. In September 2015, Naughty Dog announced that Uncharted 4 would miss its intended release date of late 2015, delaying it until March 18, 2016, to allow further polishing for the ending. The game was delayed twice more for further polishing: first until April, and finally to May 10.

Amazon began prematurely shipping copies of the game on April 26, 2016. The following day, copies were stolen while in transit to retail in the United Kingdom. The developers expressed disappointment in those sharing spoilers online. Naughty Dog announced single-player downloadable content, due to the success of The Last of Us: Left Behind. Uncharted: The Lost Legacy, a stand-alone expansion, was released in August 2017 for PlayStation 4, featuring Chloe Frazer and Nadine Ross.

An investor presentation by Sony in May 2021 reported that the game would be released for Windows. In September, a remastered version of the game for PlayStation 5 and Windows was announced as part of the Uncharted: Legacy of Thieves Collection, with The Lost Legacy. It was released for PlayStation 5 on January 28, 2022, and for Windows, developed in collaboration with Iron Galaxy, on October 19. Owners of either game on PlayStation 4 can upgrade on PlayStation 5 for US$10 or €10. Purchasing or upgrading the game in some regions through the PlayStation Store granted a voucher code for a ticket to the film Uncharted (2022). A launch trailer for Legacy of Thieves Collection was released on January 21.

=== Promotion ===
A Sony marketing manager said that Uncharted 4 was "PlayStation's largest ever software investment". The debut trailer was released along with the game announcement, on November 14, 2013, featuring the voice of Stashwick. The trailer shows an ancient map of the African continent, stopping at Madagascar, where Île Sainte-Marie is marked. A trailer was unveiled at E3 2014 on June 10, showcasing the concept, returning characters, and setting. The first game cinematic was showcased at E3 2015 on June 16, depicting a scene in which Nathan and Sully are ambushed by enemies, before making chase to reach Sam. An extended trailer was showcased in private, depicting Nathan reaching Sam, and the two killing and outrunning the enemies on a motorcycle before meeting Sully and Elena; the extended trailer was released on July 1, 2016.

A trailer for the multiplayer mode was released on October 27, 2015, as part of Paris Games Week, followed by two more on December 3 for the PlayStation Experience on December 3, where it was playable. A cinematic introducing Nadine was shown at the Game Awards on December 4, followed by an additional clip of Nadine and Sully at the PlayStation Experience on December 5. A cinematic depicting Nathan and Sam's reunion was also showcased at the PlayStation Experience, introducing the game's branching dialogue options. A trailer titled "Man Behind the Treasure" was shown before some screenings of Star Wars: The Force Awakens (2015), and published online on December 21, featuring a piano version of the Pixies's "Where Is My Mind?". A behind-the-scenes video, which played before some Star Wars screenings, was also published.

The story trailer, which Druckmann considered "the best trailer in Naughty Dog's history", was released on February 24, 2016. Ubisoft's Aymar Azaïzia noticed the trailer featured of a piece of art from Assassin's Creed IV: Black Flag (2013); Naughty Dog replaced it in a new version and apologized to Ubisoft. A trailer titled "Heads or Tails", depicting Nathan contemplating his choices, was released on March 25, and shown before some screenings of Batman v Superman: Dawn of Justice and 10 Cloverfield Lane (both 2016). A trailer for the multiplayer mode Plunder was released on April 22; it was playable at PAX East on April 22–24. The final pre-launch trailer was released on April 25, 2016.

A beta for the multiplayer mode was included with all copies of Uncharted: The Nathan Drake Collection, and was available from December 4–13, 2015. An open beta was later available from March 4–7, 2016, to all users. To encourage pre-order sales, Naughty Dog collaborated with several outlets to provide special edition versions of the game: the "Special Edition" includes a SteelBook case, a hardcover art book, and unlock codes for additional content in the multiplayer mode; and the "Libertalia Collector's Edition" also included a statue of Nathan Drake. The cover art was unveiled on June 3, 2015. Sony released a 500 GB PlayStation 4 console, which includes a copy of the game and a set of Uncharted 4-branded DualShock 4 controllers. A pair of Uncharted 4-themed PlayStation headphones was also released.

== Reception ==
=== Critical response ===
Reception

Aggregate score
Aggregator	Score
Metacritic	93/100

Review scores
Publication	Score
Destructoid	9.5/10
Game Informer	9.5/10
GameSpot	10/10
GamesRadar+	4/5
Giant Bomb	5/5
IGN	9/10
Polygon	9/10
VideoGamer.com	8/10

Uncharted 4: A Thief's End received "universal acclaim" according to review aggregator website Metacritic. It is the joint sixth-highest rated PlayStation 4 game on Metacritic. IGN's Lucy O'Brien wrote that the game is "a remarkable achievement in blockbuster storytelling and graphical beauty"; GameSpot's Mike Mahardy similarly named it a "breathtaking marvel of a game". GamesTM considered it "a masterful piece of storytelling", and Electronic Gaming Monthly's (EGM) Nick Plessas declared it "a true work of art".

Giant Bomb's Dan Ryckert considered the graphics the best on any console, praising the character details and open environments. Destructoid's Steven Hansen described the art direction as "stunning" and Game Informer's Andrew Reiner called the game "a work of art". GamesRadar's Leon Hurley praised the minute graphical details that made the characters feel more alive. GameSpot's Mahardy noted the cinematography, both in gameplay and during cutscenes, "amplifies the wonder of this gorgeous world". The Escapist's Liz Finnegan described the game as "painfully beautiful", and Sam Loveridge of Digital Spy lauded Naughty Dog's ability to create "cleverly crafted stunning vistas".

Polygon's Griffin McElroy found the narrative more nuanced than its predecessors. Destructoid's Hansen praised the writers for bringing the narrative to a cohesive conclusion, Game Informer's Reiner appreciated them for turning Avery's secrets into "tantalizing story material"; conversely, Ars Technica's Kyle Orland found the characters' enthusiasm uninteresting. GameSpot's Mahardy considered the set pieces the best in the series and among the best in video gaming. The Escapist's Finnegan felt the "action never feels unnaturally halted in order to relay relevant pieces of the story". EGM's Plessas found enjoyment in the subtler interactions more than the overall narrative, and The A.V. Club's Zack Handlen lauded the dramatic moments. VideoGamer.com's Steven Burns felt the story had too much padding that slowed it down but considered it the series's best.

Uncharted 4 was praised for taking advantage of the PlayStation 4's hardware for improved visual fidelity and more open-ended gameplay and environments.

The characters and relationships received particular praise. Hansen of Destructoid felt the character relationships were not overshadowed by the action, particularly praising the performance of Emily Rose as Elena for "perfectly and subtly conveying the intricacies of her relationship". Polygon's McElroy felt the chemistry between the two characters was at its best in Uncharted 4. Giant Bomb's Ryckert echoed this sentiment, adding that the conversations between Nathan and Sam Drake felt "more natural than hammy". GameSpot's Mahardy wrote that the additional details revealed about Nathan are "painfully human", helping to bring the characters to life. Hurley of GamesRadar felt the addition of Sam and his backstory crowded the narrative and removing the character would have improved the game. Stephen Totilo of Kotaku considered Sam to be "more of a plot device for others to react to than a compelling character on his own".

GameSpot's Mahardy thought the action "flows seamlessly alongside its narrative", praising the addition of stealth combat and its similarity to The Last of Us. Giant Bomb's Ryckert felt the player's companions were more fleshed-out than in previous entries. The Telegraph's Tom Hoggins described the firearm gameplay as "punchy and pleasing", appreciating the fast-paced combat. Destructoid's Hansen described the puzzles as "fluid and dynamic", particularly lauding the addition of the grappling hook. Game Informer's Reiner echoed the latter sentiment, noting the grappling hook enhanced exploration and combat, but felt the set pieces delivered less exciting moments than in previous games.

Game Informer's Reiner considered the environments "so vast that they take on the illusion of open worlds", and The Telegraph's Hoggins felt they make the player feel like "more of an adventurer". IGN's O'Brien found the addition of choices in the game refreshing. Digital Spy's Loveridge appreciated the additional freedom granted by new combat options, allowing the player to map their tactics in advance. GamesRadar's Hurley praised the improved gameplay but found some nonlinear moments, such as optional interactions and dialogue, "a little overcooked" in contrast to previous entries. The Guardian's Keith Stuart found the linearity immersion-breaking, particularly criticizing the repetition in traversal. USgamer's Mike Williams felt the open driving level "robs the game of its pacing" despite granting the feeling of a larger scale.

Critics shared generally positive reviews for Uncharted 4's multiplayer component but felt the single-player mode took precedence. O'Brien of IGN wrote that the multiplayer game types "embody the series' most enjoyable qualities", while Hurley of GamesRadar felt it benefited from the new mechanics introduced in the single-player story. Polygon's McElroy considered the multiplayer mode "extremely easy to pick up on", and Loveridge of Digital Spy found the multiplayer approachable and enjoyable. Game Informer's Reiner described the multiplayer combat as "fevered" and exciting, but encountered issues with loading matches. Giant Bomb's Ryckert considered the multiplayer "basic", noting players are unlikely to return for long.

=== Accolades ===
Following its previews at E3, Uncharted 4 was nominated for numerous awards, including Best PlayStation Game from several gaming publications. After its release, the game garnered awards and nominations in a variety of categories with particular praise for its gameplay mechanics, narrative, emotional depth, visual design, and multiplayer. At the Game Awards 2016, Uncharted 4 was nominated for eight awards, winning two: Best Narrative and Best Performance for North. The game received ten nominations at the 20th Annual D.I.C.E. Awards and won four, including Adventure Game of the Year and Outstanding Achievement in Story.

It was nominated for four awards at the 6th Annual New York Game Awards and four at the 17th Annual Game Developers Choice Awards, winning one at each. The game won Outstanding Character Animation in a Video Game at the 44th Annie Awards, Outstanding Visual Effects in a Real-Time Project at the 15th Visual Effects Society Awards, and Outstanding Achievement in Videogame Writing at the 67th Writers Guild of America Awards. At the 2017 SXSW Gaming Awards, the game won five awards out of eight nominations, including Video Game of the Year, Excellence in Narrative, and Most Memorable Character. The game received eight nominations at the 13th British Academy Games Awards, ultimately winning Best Game.

Award	Date	Category	Recipient(s) and nominee(s)	Result	Ref.
Annie Awards	February 4, 2017	Outstanding Achievement, Character Animation in a Video Game	Jeremy Yates, Almudena Soria, Eric Baldwin, Paul Davies, Tom Bland	Won	
British Academy Games Awards	April 6, 2017	Best Game	Uncharted 4: A Thief's End	Won	
British Academy Games Awards	April 6, 2017	Artistic Achievement	Uncharted 4: A Thief's End	Nominated	
British Academy Games Awards	April 6, 2017	Audio Achievement	Uncharted 4: A Thief's End	Nominated	
British Academy Games Awards	April 6, 2017	Music	Henry Jackman, Jonathan Mayer, and Scott Hanau	Nominated	
British Academy Games Awards	April 6, 2017	Narrative	Neil Druckmann, Josh Scherr	Nominated	
British Academy Games Awards	April 6, 2017	Performer	Emily Rose as Elena Fisher	Nominated	
British Academy Games Awards	April 6, 2017	Performer	Nolan North as Nathan Drake	Nominated	
British Academy Games Awards	April 6, 2017	Performer	Troy Baker as Sam Drake	Nominated	
Canadian Video Game Awards	November 15, 2016	Fans' Choice: Best International Game	Uncharted 4: A Thief's End	Nominated	
D.I.C.E. Awards	February 23, 2017	Adventure Game of the Year	Uncharted 4: A Thief's End	Won	
D.I.C.E. Awards	February 23, 2017	Outstanding Achievement in Animation	Uncharted 4: A Thief's End	Won	
D.I.C.E. Awards	February 23, 2017	Outstanding Achievement in Story	Uncharted 4: A Thief's End	Won	
D.I.C.E. Awards	February 23, 2017	Outstanding Technical Achievement	Uncharted 4: A Thief's End	Won	
D.I.C.E. Awards	February 23, 2017	Game of the Year	Uncharted 4: A Thief's End	Nominated	
D.I.C.E. Awards	February 23, 2017	Outstanding Achievement in Game Direction	Uncharted 4: A Thief's End	Nominated	
D.I.C.E. Awards	February 23, 2017	Outstanding Achievement in Game Design	Uncharted 4: A Thief's End	Nominated	
D.I.C.E. Awards	February 23, 2017	Outstanding Achievement in Art Direction	Uncharted 4: A Thief's End	Nominated	
D.I.C.E. Awards	February 23, 2017	Outstanding Achievement in Character	Nathan Drake	Nominated	
D.I.C.E. Awards	February 23, 2017	Outstanding Achievement in Sound Design	Uncharted 4: A Thief's End	Nominated	
Empire Awards	March 19, 2017	Best Video Game	Uncharted 4: A Thief's End	Won	
Game Audio Network Guild Awards	March 23, 2017	Audio of the Year	Uncharted 4: A Thief's End	Won	
Game Audio Network Guild Awards	March 23, 2017	Best Cinematic/Cutscene Audio	Uncharted 4: A Thief's End	Won	
Game Audio Network Guild Awards	March 23, 2017	Best Dialogue	Uncharted 4: A Thief's End	Won	
Game Audio Network Guild Awards	March 23, 2017	Best Audio Mix	Uncharted 4: A Thief's End	Won	
Game Audio Network Guild Awards	March 23, 2017	Sound Design of the Year	Uncharted 4: A Thief's End	Nominated	
Game Audio Network Guild Awards	March 23, 2017	Best Interactive Score	Uncharted 4: A Thief's End	Nominated	
The Game Awards	December 5, 2014	Most Anticipated Game	Uncharted 4: A Thief's End	Nominated	
The Game Awards	December 3, 2015	Most Anticipated Game	Uncharted 4: A Thief's End	Nominated	
The Game Awards	December 1, 2016	Best Narrative	Uncharted 4: A Thief's End	Won	
The Game Awards	December 1, 2016	Best Performance	Nolan North as Nathan Drake	Won	
The Game Awards	December 1, 2016	Best Performance	Emily Rose as Elena Fisher	Nominated	
The Game Awards	December 1, 2016	Best Performance	Troy Baker as Sam Drake	Nominated	
The Game Awards	December 1, 2016	Game of the Year	Uncharted 4: A Thief's End	Nominated	
The Game Awards	December 1, 2016	Best Game Direction	Uncharted 4: A Thief's End	Nominated	
The Game Awards	December 1, 2016	Best Art Direction	Uncharted 4: A Thief's End	Nominated	
The Game Awards	December 1, 2016	Best Action/Adventure Game	Uncharted 4: A Thief's End	Nominated	
Game Critics Awards	July 7, 2015	Best Console Game	Uncharted 4: A Thief's End	Won	
Game Critics Awards	July 7, 2015	Best Action/Adventure Game	Uncharted 4: A Thief's End	Won	
Game Critics Awards	July 7, 2015	Special Commendation for Graphics	Uncharted 4: A Thief's End	Won	
Game Critics Awards	July 7, 2015	Best of Show	Uncharted 4: A Thief's End	Nominated	
Game Developers Choice Awards	March 1, 2017	Game of the Year	Uncharted 4: A Thief's End	Nominated	
Game Developers Choice Awards	March 1, 2017	Best Narrative	Uncharted 4: A Thief's End	Nominated	
Game Developers Choice Awards	March 1, 2017	Best Technology	Uncharted 4: A Thief's End	Won	
Game Developers Choice Awards	March 1, 2017	Best Visual Art	Uncharted 4: A Thief's End	Nominated	
Golden Joystick Awards	November 18, 2016	PlayStation Game of the Year	Uncharted 4: A Thief's End	Won	
Golden Joystick Awards	November 18, 2016	Game of the Year	Uncharted 4: A Thief's End	Nominated	
Golden Joystick Awards	November 18, 2016	Best Storytelling	Uncharted 4: A Thief's End	Nominated	
Golden Joystick Awards	November 18, 2016	Best Visual Design	Uncharted 4: A Thief's End	Nominated	
Golden Joystick Awards	November 18, 2016	Best Audio	Uncharted 4: A Thief's End	Nominated	
Golden Joystick Awards	November 18, 2016	Best Performance	Nolan North as Nathan Drake	Nominated	
Italian Video Game Awards	March 16, 2017	Best Graphics	Uncharted 4: A Thief's End	Won	
Italian Video Game Awards	March 16, 2017	Best Action/Adventure Game	Uncharted 4: A Thief's End	Won	
Italian Video Game Awards	March 16, 2017	Special Audience Prize	Uncharted 4: A Thief's End	Won	
Italian Video Game Awards	March 16, 2017	Game of the Year	Uncharted 4: A Thief's End	Nominated	
Italian Video Game Awards	March 16, 2017	Best Gameplay	Uncharted 4: A Thief's End	Nominated	
Italian Video Game Awards	March 16, 2017	Best Character	Nathan Drake	Nominated	
Italian Video Game Awards	March 16, 2017	Best Story	Uncharted 4: A Thief's End	Nominated	
New York Game Awards	January 19, 2017	Big Apple Award for Best Game of the Year	Uncharted 4: A Thief's End	Won	
New York Game Awards	January 19, 2017	Herman Melville Award for Best Writing	Uncharted 4: A Thief's End	Nominated	
New York Game Awards	January 19, 2017	Great White Way Award for Best Acting in a Game	Troy Baker as Sam Drake	Nominated	
New York Game Awards	January 19, 2017	Great White Way Award for Best Acting in a Game	Emily Rose as Elena Fisher	Nominated	
SXSW Gaming Awards	March 18, 2017	Video Game of the Year	Uncharted 4: A Thief's End	Won	
SXSW Gaming Awards	March 18, 2017	Excellence in Narrative	Uncharted 4: A Thief's End	Won	
SXSW Gaming Awards	March 18, 2017	Most Memorable Character	Nathan Drake	Won	
SXSW Gaming Awards	March 18, 2017	Excellence in Animation	Uncharted 4: A Thief's End	Won	
SXSW Gaming Awards	March 18, 2017	Excellence in Visual Achievement	Uncharted 4: A Thief's End	Won	
SXSW Gaming Awards	March 18, 2017	Excellence in Design	Uncharted 4: A Thief's End	Nominated	
SXSW Gaming Awards	March 18, 2017	Excellence in Technical Achievement	Uncharted 4: A Thief's End	Nominated	
SXSW Gaming Awards	March 18, 2017	Excellence in SFX	Uncharted 4: A Thief's End	Nominated	
Titanium Awards	November 24, 2016	Best Video Game of the Year	Uncharted 4: A Thief's End	Won	
Titanium Awards	November 24, 2016	Best OST	Uncharted 4: A Thief's End	Won	
Titanium Awards	November 24, 2016	Best Performance in Spanish	Roberto Encinas as Nathan Drake	Won	
Visual Effects Society Awards	February 7, 2017	Outstanding Visual Effects in a Real-Time Project	Bruce Straley, Eben Cook, and Iki Ikram	Won	
Writers Guild of America Awards	February 19, 2017	Outstanding Achievement in Videogame Writing	Neil Druckmann, Josh Scherr, Tom Bissell, and Ryan James	Won	

== Sales ==
Within seven days of its release, Uncharted 4 sold over 2.7 million units, making it the fastest-selling first-party PlayStation 4 game. It grossed over $56 million in digital sales within three weeks. The game sold 8.7 million copies by December 2016, making it one of the best-selling PlayStation 4 games, and over 15 million copies by May 2019. In the United States, it was the best-selling retail game in May 2016. In the United Kingdom, the game topped the charts, achieving the strongest debut of the series with a 66% increase in first-week sales over Uncharted 3. In Japan, the game topped the charts in its first week, with over 128,000 units sold; it remained atop the charts the following week, with an additional 21,000 units sold. Within five years, Uncharted 4 reached 37 million players, of whom 13.3 million played multiplayer and 9.5 million used accessibility features. According to internal data leaked in 2023, the game had sold 18.616 million copies by February 2022.

== In other media ==
The 2022 Uncharted film takes inspiration from A Thief's End. The game was used in a scientific study published in Physiology & Behavior in 2024, wherein 54 male participants were randomly assigned a violent or non-violent section from the game; the study found that those playing the violent sections had decreased stress levels.
