= Edward Staley =

American businessman (1903–1987)

- Born: 1903
- Died: December 9, 1987 (aged 83–84); Palm Beach, Florida, US
- Occupations: Chairman of W. T. Grant, 1966-1973
- Spouse: Frances Kennedy Staley
- Children: 3
- Relatives: Jes Staley (grandson); Peter Staley (grandson)

Edward Staley (1903 – December 9, 1987) was chairman of W. T. Grant, the American variety store chain, from 1966 until his retirement in 1973.

Staley joined W. T. Grant in 1926, but left in 1933 to join Montgomery Ward as an assistant merchandising manager, and rose to store manager by 1940. In 1940, Staley rejoined Grant as director of merchandising. He was president from 1952 to 1959, vice chairman from 1959 to 1966, and chairman from 1966 until his retirement in 1973.

Staley died of a heart attack in Palm Beach, Florida, on December 9, 1987, leaving his wife Frances Kennedy Staley; two sons, Paul, of Wayne, Pennsylvania, and Alan, of Westbury, Long Island, and a daughter, Lynn Sternick, of San Francisco. His grandsons include Jes Staley, former CEO of Barclays, and Peter Staley, HIV/AIDS activist.
