= Stale, Poland =

Stale
- Village
- Location within Poland
- Coordinates: 50°34′N 21°45′E
- Country: Poland
- Voivodeship: Subcarpathian
- County: Tarnobrzeg
- Gmina: Grębów

Stale [ˈstalɛ] is a village in the administrative district of Gmina Grębów, within Tarnobrzeg County, Subcarpathian Voivodeship, in south-eastern Poland.
