= Ståle Petter Lyngstadaas =

Norwegian dental researcher

Ståle Petter Lyngstadaas (born 1962) is a Norwegian professor and researcher with a focus on biomaterials and bone regeneration. Since 2013, he is the Vice-Dean of Research at Faculty of Dentistry, Oslo University He is the discoverer of Lyngstadaas syndrome.
