= Ståle Storli =

Song
- Language: Norwegian
- Published: 1880
- Genre: Folk music
- Songwriter: John Lie

Ståle Storli, also spelled Staale Storlid, is the title of a Norwegian folk song and a novel by John Lie, published in 1880.

Ståle Storli is a folk song concerning love towards a cotter's daughter, which is not reciprocated. A recording was made in 1936 with Aslak Brekke performing vocals and Eivind Groven performing on harmonium. A recording with Agnes Buen Garnås has also been released.
