= Bruce Straley =

American video game designer

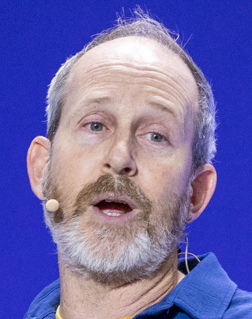
- Straley in 2026
- Occupations: Game director; artist; designer
- Employers: Western Technologies (1992–1993); Pacific Softscape (1993–1995); Crystal Dynamics (1996–1999); Naughty Dog (1999–2017); Wildflower Interactive (2021–present)
- Notable work: Uncharted; The Last of Us

Bruce Straley is an American game director, artist, designer, and studio director. He previously worked for the video game developer Naughty Dog, known for his work on the video games The Last of Us and Uncharted 4: A Thief's End. Straley's first video game work was as an artist at Western Technologies Inc, where he worked on the Menacer six-game cartridge (1992) (Note: The Menacer six-game cartridge consisted of: Ready, Aim, Tomatoes!, Rockman's Zone, Space Station Defender, Whack Ball, Front Line and Pest Control.) and X-Men (1993). He formed a company, Pacific Softscape, working as a designer on Generations Lost (1994). After the company disbanded, Straley was hired at Crystal Dynamics, working as a designer on Gex: Enter the Gecko (1998) and as game director for Gex 3: Deep Cover Gecko (1999); he left the company during development of the latter.

Straley was hired at Naughty Dog in 1999, working as an artist on Crash Team Racing (1999) and the Jak and Daxter series (2001–2004). He became co-art director on Uncharted: Drake's Fortune (2007), and was promoted to game director of Uncharted 2: Among Thieves (2009). He was later chosen to lead development on The Last of Us (2013) as game director, a role he continued during the development of Uncharted 4: A Thief's End (2016). Straley has received praise for his work. In particular, his work on The Last of Us was highly praised, and the game received several awards and nominations. He departed Naughty Dog in September 2017, and started his own studio, Wildflower Interactive, in March 2021. They announced their debut game, Coven of the Chicken Foot, in 2025.

== Career ==
Bruce Straley grew up near Tampa, Florida. He felt pressure from his mother to attend school after his brother and sister dropped out; since he felt that drawing was his only talent, he attended the Art Institute of Fort Lauderdale and received a degree in advertising design. When Straley heard about California from his friend, he decided to move to Los Angeles. After struggling to find a job in advertising, he applied for an art design position at Western Technologies Inc. At the job interview the following day, a programmer showed him footage from Sonic the Hedgehog (1991) and asked if he could make similar art; he said he could, and was offered the job by the end of the day. He worked on a video game about Robosaurus for some time, though it was eventually canceled.

Straley worked on two more games at Western Technologies Inc: the Menacer six-game cartridge in 1992, and X-Men in 1993. Following this, he formed a company, Pacific Softscape, with some ex-employees at Western Technologies. There, he worked as designer on Generations Lost in 1994. He felt too inexperienced to run a company, and did not get along with some of his coworkers, so the company disbanded in 1995. He left the industry for a short time, traveling to Europe, before moving to San Francisco in 1996 and receiving a job at Crystal Dynamics through a friend. There, Straley worked alongside several future Naughty Dog employees, including Amy Hennig, who later became creative director of the Uncharted series, Evan Wells, who later became co-president of Naughty Dog, and Danny Chan, who later worked as a lead programmer on Crash Team Racing.

Straley worked as designer on Gex: Enter the Gecko (1998), and was promoted to game director for Gex 3: Deep Cover Gecko (1999). Around this time, some of his coworkers, including Wells and Chan, had moved to Naughty Dog in Santa Monica, California; Straley, unhappy with the development of Gex 3 and missing his friends, followed them and met Naughty Dog co-founder Jason Rubin. Having left during development, Straley was credited for "additional art" on Gex 3. In March 1999, Straley was employed at Naughty Dog; he was the fifteenth employee.

At Naughty Dog, Straley worked as an artist on Crash Team Racing in 1999. Although he was employed as a texture artist, the small size of the team resulted in Straley performing various jobs, including design, background modeling and foreground animating, among others. As the size of the studio grew, the tasks became more specific. Straley acted as artist on Jak and Daxter: The Precursor Legacy (2001), Jak II (2003), and Jak 3 (2004). Straley is credited with creating the technology that managed the appearance of the Jak and Daxter series, and having the knowledge to understand the technical and artistic features, bridging the communication gap between the two departments. For Uncharted: Drake's Fortune (2007), Straley was appointed the role of co-art director, alongside Bob Rafei, which involved advancing the team's technology from the PlayStation 2 to the PlayStation 3. He was then given the role of game director for Uncharted 2: Among Thieves, which was released in 2009.

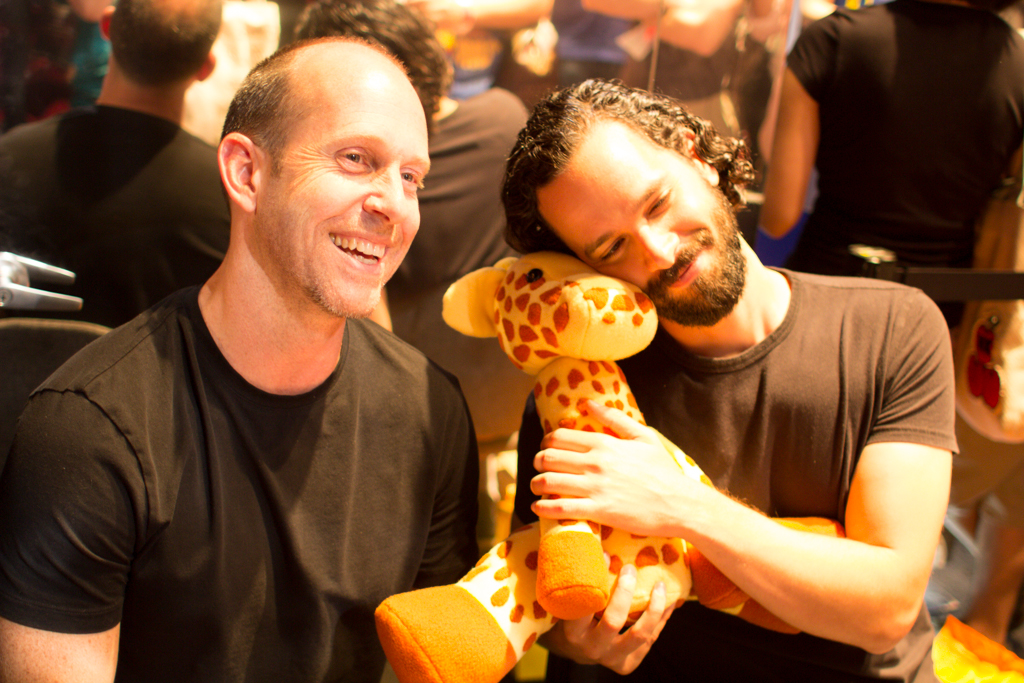
Straley (left) worked with creative director Neil Druckmann (right) on The Last of Us, The Last of Us: Left Behind, and Uncharted 4: A Thief's End.

Following the development of Uncharted 2, Naughty Dog split into two teams to work on projects concurrently. With one team working on Uncharted 3: Drake's Deception (2011), co-presidents Evan Wells and Christophe Balestra chose Straley and Neil Druckmann to lead development on a new game; Straley was selected to lead the project, as game director, based on his experience and his work on previous projects. Though they were originally set to develop a new game in the Jak and Daxter series, the team felt that they "weren't doing service to the fans of [the] franchise", and decided to create a new game, titled The Last of Us.

Straley and Druckmann had previously worked together on Uncharted 2, and found that they shared similar interests. During the development of The Last of Us, Straley and Druckmann often joked that their relationship was "like a marriage", in which they have many differing ideas, but ultimately wish to achieve the same goal. Straley's role in developing The Last of Us was to handle gameplay. In the final weeks of development, Straley undertook roles from different departments that were busy with other tasks; for example, he was seen hand-arranging the texts on the game's training screens, a task that lead artist Nate Wells found unusual. Wells said: "I have never even heard of a game director doing that! That's like... an intern task."

At the Electronic Entertainment Expo 2012, Straley showcased a gameplay demonstration of The Last of Us at Sony's press conference; his stance on the stage became an Internet meme, and was referred to as "The Bruce". The game was released on June 14, 2013, to critical acclaim. For his work on the game, Straley and Druckmann were nominated for Best Director from The Daily Telegraph; it was ultimately awarded to Davey Wreden for his work on The Stanley Parable (2013). Straley later continued his role as game director for The Last of Us: Left Behind (2014), a downloadable content and expansion pack for the 2013 game.

Following Hennig's departure from Naughty Dog in March 2014, it was announced that Straley and Druckmann were working on Uncharted 4: A Thief's End (2016) as game director and creative director, respectively. Initial reports claimed that Hennig was "forced out" of Naughty Dog by Straley and Druckmann, though Wells and Balestra later denied this. Straley presented gameplay demonstrations of Uncharted 4 at the PlayStation Experience in December 2014, and at the E3 2015 in June. The game was released on May 10, 2016, to critical acclaim. For his work on the game, Straley won Outstanding Visual Effects in a Real-Time Project at the 15th Visual Effects Society Awards, alongside visual effects artists Eben Cook and Iki Ikram.

Straley took a break from development after the release of Uncharted 4; he did not return to direct The Last of Us Part II. On September 13, 2017, Straley announced his departure from Naughty Dog, stating that he "found [his] energy focusing in other directions" following his break. He wanted to experiment with his creations, which he found difficult at a studio like Naughty Dog. His decision to leave was also partly due to burnout; his relationship with Naughty Dog and Sony had become strained. Following the lack of credit to Straley in the television series The Last of Us in 2023, he considered the support for unionization in the video game industry, saying it may be necessary "to protect creators".

Straley worked as a story consultant on Chained: A Victorian Nightmare (2018), a virtual reality theater experience. He was awarded the Vanguard Award at the Fun & Serious Game Festival in December 2019. After leaving the industry in 2017, Straley was unsure if he wanted to continue making games; however, after thinking more about the medium, an "idea kept following [him]". He and some friends began prototyping, and eventually decided to create a studio, Wildflower Interactive, founded on March 11, 2021, and announced in July 2022. As studio director, Straley wants the studio to be "inclusive, equitable, and collaborative". It is operating in a fully remote work environment with 16 employees, including 12 developers, as of 2025. The studio's first game, Coven of the Chicken Foot, was revealed at the Game Awards 2025.

== Works ==
=== Video games ===
Year	Game title	Role
1992	Menacer six-game cartridge	Artist
1993	X-Men	Art, design
1994	Generations Lost	Designer
1996	Mr. Bones	Additional animation
1998	Gex: Enter the Gecko	Designer
1999	Gex 3: Deep Cover Gecko	Additional art
1999	Crash Team Racing	Artist
2001	Jak and Daxter: The Precursor Legacy	Artist
2003	Jak II	Artist
2004	Jak 3	Artist
2007	Uncharted: Drake's Fortune	Co-art director
2009	Uncharted 2: Among Thieves	Game director
2013	The Last of Us	Game director
2014	The Last of Us: Left Behind	Game director
2016	Uncharted 4: A Thief's End	Game director
TBA	Coven of the Chicken Foot	Game director

Other credits

- 2017 – Gorogoa (special thanks)
- 2018 – Chained: A Victorian Nightmare (story consultant)

=== Literature ===
Year	Title	Role	Notes
2013	The Art of The Last of Us	Writer (introduction)	with Neil Druckmann
2014	The Art of Naughty Dog	Writer (sections)	with Neil Druckmann, Evan Wells, and Christophe Balestra

=== Film and television ===
Year	Title	Notes
2012	Late Night with Jimmy Fallon	Talk show; episode 653
2013	Grounded: Making The Last of Us	Documentary
2015	Conversations with Creators	Web series; episode 2

== Awards and nominations ==
Date	Award	Category	Work	Result	Ref.
December 31, 2013	Telegraph Video Game Awards 2013	Best Director	The Last of Us (Note: Co-nominated with Neil Druckmann)	Nominated	
February 7, 2017	15th Visual Effects Society Awards	Outstanding Visual Effects in a Real-Time Project	Uncharted 4: A Thief's End (Note: Co-nominated with Eben Cook and Iki Ikram)	Won	
December 11, 2019	Fun & Serious Game Festival	Vanguard Award	—N/a	Won	
