= Peter Staley =

American political activist

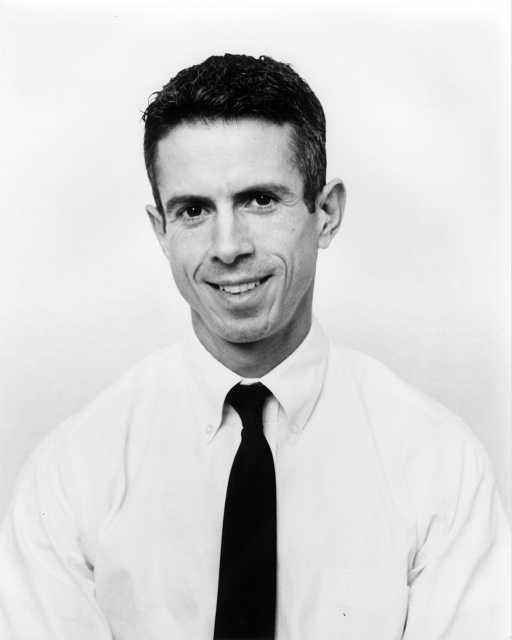
- Staley in 2001
- Born: January 9, 1961 (age 65); Sacramento, California, U.S.
- Education: Oberlin College
- Occupation: Activist
- Known for: ACT UP
- Relatives: Jes Staley (brother); Edward Staley (grandfather)

Peter Staley (born January 9, 1961) is an American political activist, known primarily for his work in HIV/AIDS activism. As an early and influential member of ACT UP, New York, he founded both the Treatment Action Group (TAG) and the educational website AIDSmeds.com. Staley is a primary figure in the Oscar-nominated documentary How to Survive a Plague.

== Early life and education ==
Peter Staley was born in Sacramento, California, on January 9, 1961, the third of four children. His father was a plant manager for Procter & Gamble. Staley's family moved throughout the US until he was eight, they settled in Berwyn, Pennsylvania, when his father was hired to run the PQ Corporation, based in Philadelphia. He attended Oberlin College after first studying classical piano at the Oberlin Conservatory of Music for a semester. He majored in economics and government, spending his junior year abroad at the London School of Economics before graduating from Oberlin in 1983. Following his graduation, he went to work for J.P. Morgan, where his brother Jes Staley was working (Jes became the CEO of J.P. Morgan's Investment Bank, before leaving in 2013 to join BlueMountain Capital and then was the CEO of Barclays).

In October 2021, Staley released his memoir, Never Silent. The foreword was written by Anderson Cooper. Hillary Clinton described the book as a "timely must-read", saying, "For decades, Peter Staley's name has been synonymous with brave, determined activism on behalf of the LGBTQ community."

== Activism ==
=== Involvement with ACT UP ===
After observing similarities with the symptoms depicted in the made-for-TV drama An Early Frost, Staley consulted with his physician, Dr Dan William, who diagnosed Staley with AIDS-Related Complex (ARC) in November 1985. In 1987, after being handed a flyer on his way to work prior to the first demonstration by ACT UP (AIDS Coalition To Unleash Power), he decided to attend the next meeting. Although he had come out as gay to his family, Staley remained closeted at work, working as a bond trader by day and chairing ACT UP's fundraising operations by night, before coming out at work and going on disability leave. On March 24, 1988, he took part in an ACT UP demonstration on Wall Street on the first anniversary of the group. At that demonstration, he was in one of the first waves of people sitting in the street to block traffic, and was interviewed by a local TV station who broadcast his image with the caption "Peter Staley, AIDS victim".

On April 25, 1989, Staley and three other activists barricaded themselves in an office at Burroughs Wellcome in Research Triangle Park, North Carolina, to protest the price of AZT (at the time priced at $8,000–$10,000 per year). The four protesters used power tools to bolt metal plates to the door of an unoccupied office and had planned to drop a banner that would be visible from the nearby highway, Interstate 40, before authorities cut their way through a wall. The protestors then chained themselves together, and were cut apart and charged with trespassing and property damage. Staley, who at the time had been in talks with AZT developer David Barry to lower the price of the drug, would make peace with the company years later, following their $1 million donation to AIDS clinical trials programs in 1992.

On September 14, 1989, Staley and six other activists staged another demonstration to protest the rising cost of AZT, this time in the New York Stock Exchange. Dressed in suits and carrying fake credentials, they chained themselves to a balcony above the trading floor before unfurling a banner that read "Sell Wellcome", drowned out the opening bell with airhorns, and dropped fake $100 bills that read, "Fuck your profiteering. We die while you play business" on the traders below. Within days, Burroughs Wellcome lowered the price of AZT by 20%.

In 1989, he was part of a group that stormed the Fifth International AIDS Conference in Montreal, at the time a members-only event for doctors and HIV/AIDS researchers. They took over seats reserved for dignitaries, and released their first Treatment and Data report calling for speedier access to AIDS drugs, although coverage of the demonstration was overshadowed by the events at Tiananmen Square. The next year, Staley was a featured speaker at the Sixth International Conference on AIDS in 1990, held in San Francisco. Staley would be involved in many more demonstrations and protests, ultimately being arrested 10 times, although he does not have a criminal record due to the work of pro bono lawyers.

=== Involvement with TAG ===
In 1991, Staley founded an ACT UP activist affiliate called TAG (which originally stood for Treatment Action Guerrillas, and later Treatment Action Group). Formed from ACT UP's Treatment and Data Committee, the group was focused on actively working to pursue AIDS treatment solutions through activism, and working with groups that had been targeted by ACT UP, such as pharmaceutical companies. As an event to launch the birth of the group, Staley draped a giant condom over the home of North Carolina Republican Senator Jesse Helms on September 5, 1991, protesting the position the senator had taken on AIDS-related issues. The side of the giant nylon condom replica read "A condom to stop unsafe politics - Helms is deadlier than a virus." After police arrived, the group stopped the protest, and helped remove the condom. No one was arrested, and Helms decided not to press charges. Years later, Staley would reveal that the stunt had been funded by David Geffen.

TAG broke away from ACT UP to focus on protesting government agencies on working for faster drug solutions through more coordinated AIDS research efforts. At the 1992 International AIDS Conference in Amsterdam, the group called for negotiations and more proactive measures than protests in order to achieve those goals. Staley later said that he regretted the split, wishing that they had been "able to keep it together as an organization."

=== amfAR ===
From 1991 to 2004, Staley was on the board of amfAR (the Foundation for AIDS Research). A nonprofit organization dedicated to supporting HIV/AIDS research, prevention, and treatment education, the group has invested more than $366 million in its various programs over the course of its history, which have spawned significant advances in the realm of the treatment and prevention of HIV. During this time, he was named to President Bill Clinton's AIDS National Task Force on AIDS Drug Development, an 18-member panel of scientists, doctors, and AIDS advocates to work to speed the research for new AIDS drugs. In October 2000, he was honored by the organization as the recipient of their Award of Courage.

=== AIDSmeds.com ===
In 1999, Staley founded AIDSmeds.com, a site "dedicated to providing people living with HIV the necessary information they need to make empowered treatment decisions." It expanded to include topics including gay health, and education and resources related to gay health. In 2006, AIDSmeds.com merged with POZ, a publication for people living with and affected by HIV/AIDS. Staley is still with the merged organization as a blogger and advisory editor.

=== Ad campaign against crystal meth ===
In 2004, Staley funded and launched an ad campaign in New York, warning of the link between crystal meth use and HIV in gay and bisexual men. A former crystal meth addict himself, Staley had ads placed on phone booths along Eighth Avenue in Chelsea that read "Huge Sale! Buy Crystal, Get HIV Free!" The controversial ads attracted attention from both supporters and detractors.

=== How to Survive a Plague ===
Staley features prominently in the 2012 documentary How to Survive a Plague, which depicts the early years of the AIDS epidemic and the actions of ACT UP and TAG. For the film, director David France relied heavily on archival footage, much of it taken from VHS tapes in Staley's personal collection. The documentary was nominated for the Academy Award for Best Documentary Feature at the 85th Academy Awards. It also received awards for the best documentary of 2012 from the Gotham Independent Film Awards and from the Boston Society of Film Critics, and was nominated for best documentary at the Film Independent Spirit Awards. In addition, the film was nominated for a Directors Guild Award and the Grand Jury Prize at the Sundance Film Festival, and won the GLAAD Media Award for Outstanding Documentary.

=== PrEP4All ===
In 2018, Staley co-founded PrEP4All, an organization dedicated to ending HIV/AIDS through the use of pre-exposure prophylaxis.

== Personal life ==
Staley divides his time between rural Pennsylvania and an apartment in New York City's West Village, not far from where ACT UP first recruited him.
