= Jes Staley =

American banker (born 1956)

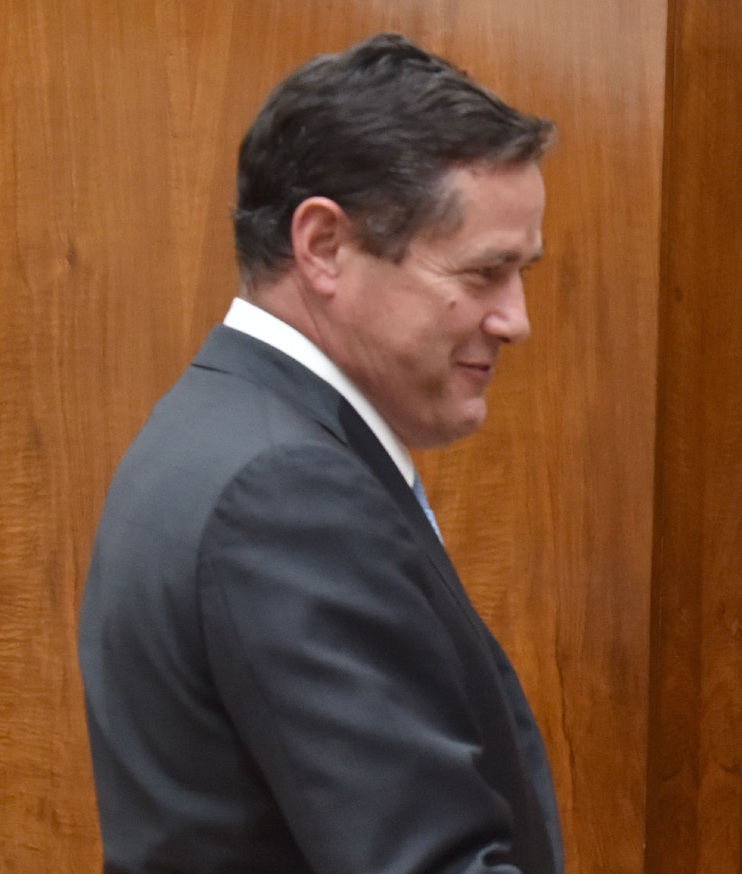
- Staley in 2016
- Born: James Edward Staley; December 27, 1956 (age 69); Boston, Massachusetts, U.S.
- Education: Bowdoin College (BA)
- Occupations: Former CEO, Barclays
- Spouse: Debora Nitzan Staley
- Children: 2
- Relatives: Peter Staley (brother); Edward Staley (grandfather); James Rhyne Killian (grandfather)

James Edward "Jes" Staley (born December 27, 1956) is an American banker and the former group chief executive of Barclays. He spent 34 years at J.P. Morgan's investment bank. After moving to BlueMountain Capital in 2013, Staley became CEO of Barclays in December 2015.

In November 2021, Staley resigned amid a regulatory probe into whether he mischaracterized his relationship with the financier, human trafficker and sex offender Jeffrey Epstein. According to The New York Times, Staley was Epstein's "chief defender" at J.P. Morgan, helping Epstein maintain accounts at the firm amid internal concerns that Epstein was using the accounts for illicit activities. Staley also divulged confidential financial information to Epstein.

Epstein named Staley one of the trustees of his estate.

== Early life ==
Staley was born on December 27, 1956, in Boston, Massachusetts. His father, Paul R. Staley, was president and CEO of PQ Corporation, a chemicals company, who eventually settled the family outside of Philadelphia, Pennsylvania. His grandfather, Edward Staley, was the top executive of W. T. Grant at the time when the merchandiser filed for bankruptcy in 1976. His brother, Peter Staley, is an AIDS activist. His maternal grandfather James Rhyne Killian was the president of Massachusetts Institute of Technology from 1948 until 1959.

Staley graduated cum laude from Bowdoin College with a degree in economics.

== Career ==
In 1979, after graduation, Staley joined Morgan Guaranty Trust Co. of New York City. From 1980 to 1989, he worked in the bank's Latin America division, where he was head of corporate finance for Brazil and general manager of the company's Brazilian brokerage firm.

=== J.P. Morgan (1990–2013) ===
In the early 1990s, Staley became one of the founding members of J.P. Morgan's equities business and ran the Equity Capital Market and Syndicate groups.

In 2001, he was promoted to CEO of J.P. Morgan Asset Management and ran the division until 2009. During his tenure, J.P. Morgan Asset Management's client assets expanded from $605 billion to nearly $1.3 trillion.

Staley also was noted for his work on J.P. Morgan's strategic investment in Highbridge Capital Management by being named as one of the twenty hedge fund superstars at J.P. Morgan.

In 2009, Staley was promoted to chief executive of the Investment Bank. In this position, Staley was responsible for overseeing and coordinating the firm's international efforts across all lines of business.

A 2015 article in The Guardian noted Staley's contribution to JP Morgan becoming an LGBT friendly company.

According to a 2025 article by Matthew Goldstein of The New York Times, Staley and CEO Jamie Dimon had a falling out over Staley's client Jeffrey Epstein sometime around 2012, after in October 2011 the General Counsel of the bank, Stephen Cutler, complained to Staley and others that Epstein was "not an honorable person in any way. He should not be a client." At the meeting between Staley, Epstein and Cutler, the last was assuaged when Epstein lied to his face and trotted out for character reference Bill Gates. The bank would not discard Epstein until, facing increased pressure from federal regulators, it did in 2013 coincidentally the year of Staley's departure.

He is a former trustee of Bowdoin College, boardmember of the United States-China Business Council, and advisory boardmember of the American Museum of Natural History.

=== BlueMountain Capital (2013–2015) ===
In 2013, Staley left J.P. Morgan after more than 30 years to join BlueMountain Capital as a managing partner.

In May 2015, he was elected to the board of directors of the Swiss global financial services company UBS as a new member of the Human Resources and Compensation Committee and of the Risk Committee. However, on October 28, 2015, it was announced that Staley would become group chief executive of Barclays, effective December 1, 2015. To avoid any conflicts of interest, UBS accepted his resignation from all of his functions at UBS with immediate effect.

=== Barclays (2015–2021) ===
On 24 October 2015, the Daily Mail published an article saying they had seen emails by Jeffrey Epstein indicating he "began arguing for Mr. Staley in financial circles in the summer of 2012" while Barclays was searching for a new CEO. The Times alleged the Daily Mail had received copies of threatening letters from Epstein that were originally sent to Parliament. The article reports that Barclays denied being lobbied by Epstein on behalf of Staley and that Staley was said to be unaware that Epstein was backing him for the role.

In autumn 2015, Staley spent £6.4 million buying 2.8 million shares in Barclays at 233p. Barclays has a policy that directors should own shares worth four times their salaries, which Staley achieved, as his salary amounted to £1.2m. However, his total remuneration package, including his salary, a fixed pay allowance to avoid an EU cap on bonuses, annual bonuses of up to £2.1 million and a long-term incentive plan of £3.2m, was worth £10 million in 2015.

Staley assumed the office of CEO on 1 December 2015.

In March 2016, he gave his vision for the future of Barclays' investment bank, although the changes he brought until then were not well received by the markets.

==== Attempt to unmask whistleblower ====
In 2016, Staley attempted to discover the identity of a whistleblower who wrote a letter raising "concerns of a personal nature" about a senior employee. These claims were investigated for over a year by British regulators, an investigation which was one of the first tests of the UK's "Senior managers regime", intended to make high-level banking officials personally accountable. On April 20, 2018, the Financial Conduct Authority and the Prudential Regulatory Authority announced that Staley could stay on as CEO, though he would have to pay a fine. Staley was fined £642,430 by the FCA and Barclays said it would cut £500,000 of his bonus over the matter. In May 2017, "email prankster" James Linton began his spree with Staley pranked with an acrostic alluding to the whistleblower affair.

==== Resignation after FCA investigation over Epstein ====
In February 2020, the FCA announced an investigation into whether Staley was "fit and proper" to lead Barclays due to concerns about his previous disclosures of his relationship with Epstein, who had in August 2019 died in custody while awaiting trial on charges for paedophilia. Staley told Bloomberg TV that "The investigation is actually focused on transparency and whether I was transparent and open with the bank and with the board with respect to my relationship with Jeffrey Epstein." Staley told colleagues that he expected to leave Barclays by the end of 2021.

On 1 November 2021, Staley resigned following the results of the company's investigation of his associations with Epstein. A short time after his departure it was reported that Staley and Epstein exchanged 1,200 emails over the course of four years. In February 2026, unsealed court documents and internal emails clarified the context of a 2010 exchange in which Staley and Epstein used the phrase "Snow White." The records revealed that shortly before the exchange, Epstein had directed an assistant to purchase a "Snow White" costume. In the subsequent emails, Staley referred to the character while discussing his visits to Epstein's properties, an association that regulators later argued demonstrated a level of intimacy and awareness of Epstein's lifestyle that Staley had downplayed. In March 2025, during an appeal against the FCA ban, Staley admitted to a consensual sexual encounter with a member of Epstein's staff at an apartment in New York in 2010. Staley stated that his disclosure of the encounter, which he described as 'publicly humiliating', was intended to demonstrate his transparency with regulators.

On June 26, 2025, the Upper Tribunal upheld the FCA's decision, finding that Staley had "recklessly" misled the watchdog regarding the nature of his relationship with Epstein. This resulted in a permanent ban from senior management roles in the UK financial sector and a final fine of £1.1 million issued in July 2025.

On February 23, 2022, Barclays froze £22 million worth of bonuses for Staley pending investigation into his links to Epstein by the FCA and the PRA.

=== Relationship with Jeffrey Epstein ===
In an April 2022 article about JPMorgan's ties to Epstein, The Wall Street Journal reported that Staley traveled to Little St. James, Epstein's private island in the Caribbean, in 2009.

In January 2023, it was reported that Staley was named in a lawsuit by a victim of Epstein against JP Morgan which alleged that JP Morgan had enabled Epstein's behavior. The suit alleged Staley knew Epstein was trafficking women and that he personally witnessed Epstein abusing an underage girl.

In May 2023, in legal papers, Staley claimed that JP Morgan's chief executive Jamie Dimon and he had discussed business with Epstein, despite the fact that Dimon denied under oath ever having involvement with Epstein as a client.

In June 2023 it was reported that, on December 26, 2009—while Epstein was on house arrest for procuring a child for prostitution and of soliciting a prostitute in Florida—Staley emailed Epstein: "Fun tonight. What do we do next?????" Epstein replied saying his driver, whom he described as "former dea [Drug Enforcement Administration]" and "armed", would pick him up in St. Thomas in the Virgin Islands. Epstein continued, "helicopter also available for a tour around, ... remember I own the two big marinas.. yacht haven grand, in st thomas and the marina at red hook... you can use my atv's jet ski, gym etc." Later that month Staley wrote to Epstein, "Arrived at your harbor. Someday, we have to do this together."

On March 3, 2025, Staley appealed a UK financial industry ban over his ties to Epstein, during which he admitted to a consensual sexual encounter with a member of Epstein's staff at an apartment in New York. Staley testified that the encounter occurred while he was waiting for Epstein to arrive for a meeting, a revelation his legal team described as a "public humiliation" that endangered his marriage. Staley argued the disclosure proved he was being "open and honest" with regulators. Staley denies the allegations, claiming unfair treatment in the Britain's Financial Conduct Authority (FCA) decision. In the court proceedings, the FCA alleged that Staley pushed JP Morgan to keep Epstein as a client despite human trafficking concerns. In June 2025, Staley lost his bid to overturn a ban from holding senior leadership. The Upper Tribunal upheld the FCA's decision, ruling that Staley had "recklessly" misled the watchdog about the nature of his relationship. The final notice issued on July 23, 2025, confirmed a £1.1 million fine and a permanent ban from holding senior management roles in the UK financial sector.

In December 2025, it was revealed that Staley and Lawrence Summers had been appointed by Epstein as executors of his estate.

In February 2026, it was revealed that Staley's daughter, Alexa Staley, communicated with Epstein from 2009 to 2018 regarding her academic career in physics. Emails between the two contained in the Epstein files indicated that Epstein helped Staley's daughter obtain an invitation to a theoretical physics conference, through Lisa Randall, and prepare an application to the PhD program in physics at Columbia University through his personal friendship with Richard Axel. Staley maintained that he cut off contact with Epstein in October 2015 and denied allegations by the FCA that he continued to communicate with Epstein through his daughter.

In March 2026, the Wall Street Journal reported that Staley had divulged confidential information to Epstein about financial dealings JPMorgan Chase was working on.

In July 2026, Staley appeared before the US House Committee on Oversight and Government Reform as part of its investigation into Jeffrey Epstein and Ghislaine Maxwell. Staley described his relationship with Epstein to the committee as professional. Democratic members of the committee disputed that characterisation, pointing to more than 1,000 e-mails in which Staley described the relationship as "profound" and referred to Epstein as "family". Staley maintained that he had been unaware of Epstein's criminal conduct.

== Personal life ==
Staley met his wife Debora Nitzan Staley soon after starting work in South America, "I was Unitarian Boston American and she was Jewish Brazilian São Paulo ... I was her parents' worst nightmare." The family has two daughters, and maintains residences on Park Avenue, New York City, and Southampton, Long Island. During his 2025 tribunal testimony, Staley stated that his decision to disclose a past sexual encounter with a member of Jeffrey Epstein's staff was a matter of "public humiliation" that put his 40-year marriage at risk, but maintained that he chose to be transparent to defend his professional integrity. On March 13, 2026, Staley's wife, Debora Staley, filed for divorce in New York.

Staley is a Boston Red Sox fan. In the past, he has donated money to the Democratic Senatorial Campaign Committee.

As of May 2017, Staley was backing his brother-in-law Jorge Nitzan in a dispute that Aceco, a Brazilian technology company founded by the Nitzan family, has with the private equity firm KKR, also an important client of Barclays. In turn, KKR stopped inviting Barclays to participate in its deal making.

=== Tribunal testimony and personal life ===
In March 2025, during a tribunal hearing to challenge a Financial Conduct Authority (FCA) ban, Staley's personal relationship with Jeffrey Epstein came under further scrutiny. During testimony, Staley admitted to a consensual sexual encounter with a woman at an apartment belonging to Epstein's brother, Mark Epstein. Staley testified that the encounter occurred while he was waiting for Epstein to arrive for a meeting.

His legal team described the disclosure as a "public humiliation" that put his 40-year marriage to Deborah Nitzan Staley at risk. Staley argued that his willingness to disclose these details, despite the personal consequences, demonstrated his commitment to being "open and honest" with the tribunal and refuted the FCA's claim that he had sought to mislead regulators regarding his ties to Epstein.

Business positions
Preceded by Antony Jenkins	Group Chief Executive of Barclays plc December 1, 2015 – November 1, 2021	Succeeded by C.S. Venkatakrishnan
