= Rolfsen =

Rolfsen is a surname derived from a masculine given name Rolf. Notable people with the surname include:

- Alf Rolfsen, Norwegian painter and muralist
- Christian Lange Rolfsen, Norwegian politician and attorney
- Dale Rolfsen
- Erik Rolfsen
- Harald Rolfsen
- Jens Rolfsen
- Katie Rolfsen
- Nordahl Rolfsen
- Ulrik Imtiaz Rolfsen
