= Ljubiša Rajić =

Serbian university professor of North Germanic languages, translator and academic

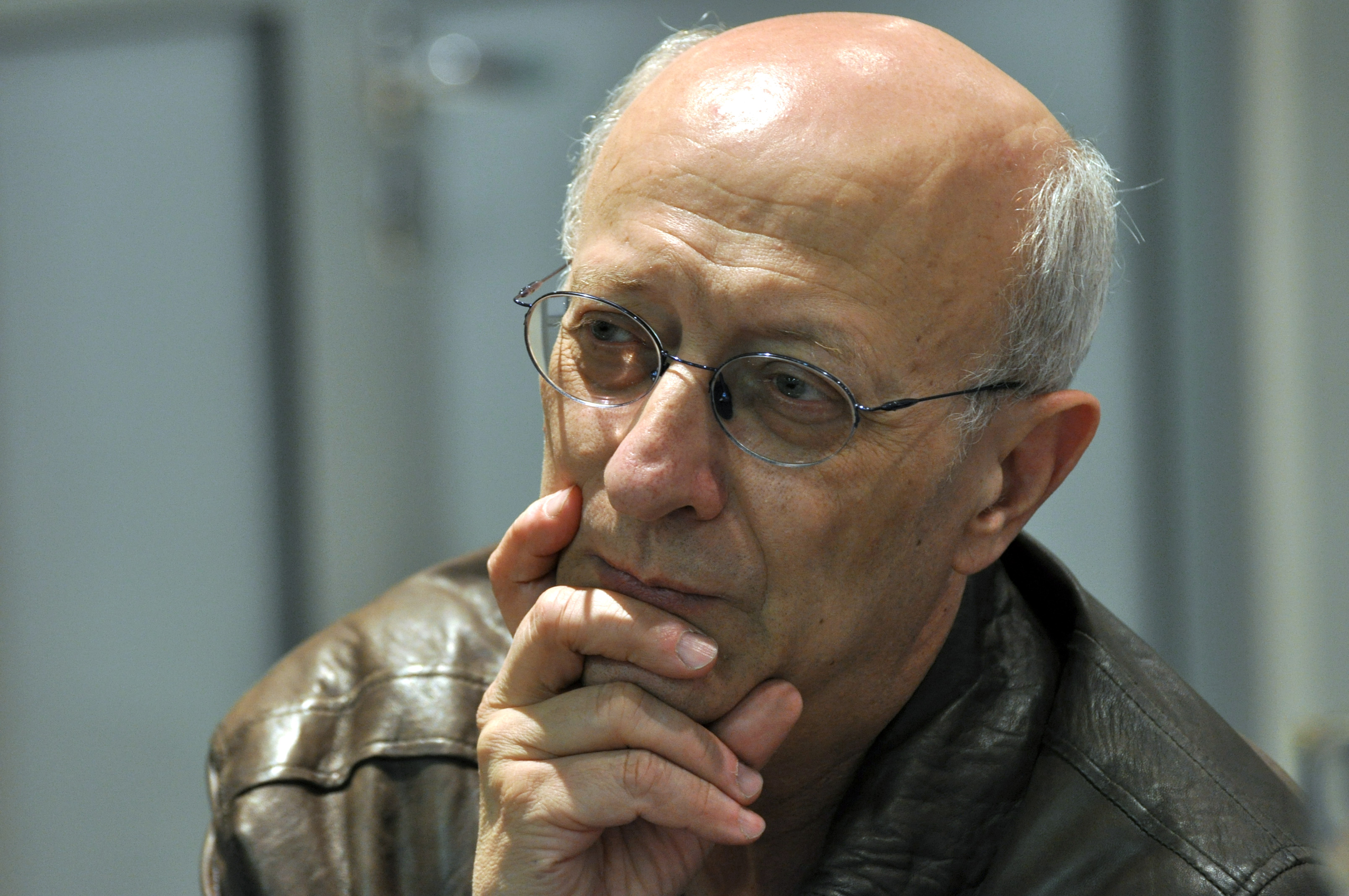
- Born: 4 April 1947; Belgrade, Yugoslavia
- Died: 4 June 2012 (aged 65); Belgrade, Serbia
- Education: Faculty of Philology in Belgrade
- Occupations: university professor, writer, translator
- Awards: Order of the Polar Star

Ljubiša Rajić (4 April 1947 – 4 June 2012) was a Serbian university professor of North Germanic languages, prolific translator and academic.

== Biography ==
He graduated North Germanic languages in 1975 in Oslo, and went on the get a master's degrees and a PhD at Faculty of Philology in Belgrade.

Rajić is the founder of North Germanic languages department at the University of Belgrade.

He died at the age of 65 in Belgrade after a long illness.

== Scientific work ==
As one of the most prolific authors and scholars in the area of North Germanic languages, Rajić authored more than 200 scientific papers and peer reviews as well as around 500 articles. The current system of transcription from North Germanic languages to Serbian was written by Rajić and published under Matica Srpska in 2010.

== Awards and legacy ==
Ljubiša Rajić Award was established in his honour. It is given every two years on the International student day and Rajićs birthday (4 April). The award is given for the first translation of prose or poetry from a foreign language.

Rajić was a foreign member of Norwegian Academy of Science and Letters.

His decorations include:

- – Knight (Chevalier) of the White Rose of Finland
- – Commander 1st Class of the Order of the Polar Star, Sweden
- – St. Olav's Medal, Norway
- – Royal Norwegian Order of Merit

== Selected works ==
- Švedska gramatika = Svensk grammatik pa serbokroatiska, 1985
- Objašnjenje u istorijskoj lingvistici, 1991
- Skandinavske književnosti u prevodu na srpskohrvatski jezik: građa za bibliografiju, 1997
- Tekst u vremenu, 2008.
- Umeće čitanja: ogledi o (književnom) tekstu, 2009
- Dnevnik iz Beograda, autobiographical prose dealing with the events during NATO bombing of Yugoslavia

=== Translations ===
- Generacija by Georg Johannesen, 1971
- Savremena norveška lirika, with Desanka Maksimović, 1978
- Kada se jedan mali narod bori za život : srpske vojničke priče by Obrest H. Angel, 1995
- Pan by Knut Hamsun, 1995
- Karius and Bactus by Thorbjørn Egner, 1995
- Sophie's World by Jostein Gaarder, 1998
- The Solitaire Mystery by Jostein Gaarder, 1998
- Through a Glass, Darkly by Jostein Gaarder, 2001
- Maya by Jostein Gaarder, 2002
- The Ringmaster's Daughter by Jostein Gaarder, 2002
- The Castle in the Pyrenees by Jostein Gaarder, 2009
- A Philosophy of Fear by Lars Svendsen, 2008
- Dramas I-II by Henrik Ibsen, 2014
