= Moseid =

Moseid is a Norwegian surname. Notable people with the surname include:

- Edvard Moseid (1945–2026), Norwegian animal expert and zoo director
- Gabriel Moseid (1882–1961), Norwegian politician, grandfather of Edvard
- Torvald Moseid (1917–2000), Norwegian visual artist

== See also ==
- MOSAID, a Canadian semiconductor technology company
