= Edvard Moseid =

Norwegian animal expert and zoo director (1945–2026)

- Born: 18 April 1945; Vennesla Municipality, German-occupied Norway
- Died: 24 May 2026 (aged 81)
- Occupations: Zoo and amusement park director
- Employer: Kristiansand Zoo and Amusement Park
- Known for: "Father" of Julius
- Relatives: Gabriel Moseid (grandfather)
- Awards: Order of St. Olav

Edvard Moseid (18 April 1945 – 24 May 2026) was a Norwegian animal expert and zoo and amusement park director.

== Background ==
Moseid was born in Vennesla Municipality on 18 April 1945, a son of farmers Endre Moseid and Sigrid Andersen, and a grandson of politician Gabriel Moseid. He died on 24 May 2026, at the age of 81.

== Career ==
Moseid was appointed director of the Kristiansand Zoo and Amusement Park, after the founder and first director of the zoo, Willi Tjomsaas, was sacked by the board of the zoo, until his retirement in 2000. Prior to his appointment as the director of the zoo, Moseid received a certification as a gardener, and worked for several years starting from the founding of the zoo in 1964 as the zoo's leading gardener. His landscaping skills and capabilities proved instrumental in the shaping of the zoo, and he became known for the thousands of tulips and other plants he ensured would decorate it throughout his years as gardener and as director. Under his leadership, the park developed into one of the most important tourist attractions in Southern Norway. The amusement elements included the Cardamom Town theme park (developed in collaboration with Thorbjørn Egner) and the stage performances of Captain Sabertooth (with Terje Formoe).

He gained national and international attention in early 1980, when he, in response to a young female chimpanzee, Sanne, rejecting her child, chose to take the young baby chimpanzee out of the Zoo's chimpanzee group and raise him as one of his own. A special permission from the Ministry of Agriculture granted Moseid the permission to keep the young chimpanzee, Julius, as his own, with the ultimate goal of returning the youngster back to the group at some time in the future. Julius would continue to live with Moseid and his family for close to a year before attempts were made at returning him to the group. Initial attempts showed promise, and Julius was reluctantly accepted into the group. Julius would have none of it, and longed back to the human world, leading to the eventual decision to let him return to the Moseid family from time to time. At the same time, Moseid began a marketing program centered around the young chimpanzee, which turned into an important revenue source for the zoo. Despite Julius being back with the humans, efforts were still made to return him to the chimpanzees. This did however not go well with the leader of the group, and Moseid eventually lost his finger to the leader, Dennis, after the latter tried to kill Julius.

Moseid was decorated Knight, First Class of the Order of St. Olav in 1999.
