= Thorbjørn Egners lesebøker =

Ola-Ola Heia, the first volume of Thorbjørn Egners lesebøker.

Thorbjørn Egners lesebøker (English: Thorbjorn Egner's Readers) were a series of sixteen readers for elementary school written by Norwegian author Thorbjørn Egner. Egner spent 25 years working on the series – consisting of collected literature as well as his own stories and illustrations – and they were published in 1950–1972. The books were intended for children aged 8–15, which at the time corresponded to grades 2nd–9th. Among the recurring characters was the young boy Ola-Ola, who grew up on a farm on the Norwegian countryside, but later moved to the city and had to adapt to a new life. Other stories took place in far-away lands, reminiscent of the environment in Egner's celebrated When the Robbers Came to Cardamom Town. There was also a selection of songs and poems in between the stories.

The books took over the role held for decades by Nordahl Rolfsen's readers in the Norwegian educational system. Rolfsen's books were published in 1892–1895, and had been the standard works since, but starting in the 1950s, Egner's books took over this position. Egner himself considered the series to be the magnum opus of his collected works. In 1972, however – the year in which the last book in the series was published – the educational program of Norwegian primary schools was altered. The new scheme largely abandoned the use of basic readers in the curriculum. As a result, Egner's textbooks were rendered virtually obsolete as educational tools. The books remain an important part of the Norwegian cultural heritage, being considered children's classics, and some of them have been reprinted more recently.
