= Cardamom Town (theme park) =

Theme park in Norway

Coordinates: 58.187220°N 8.140214°E

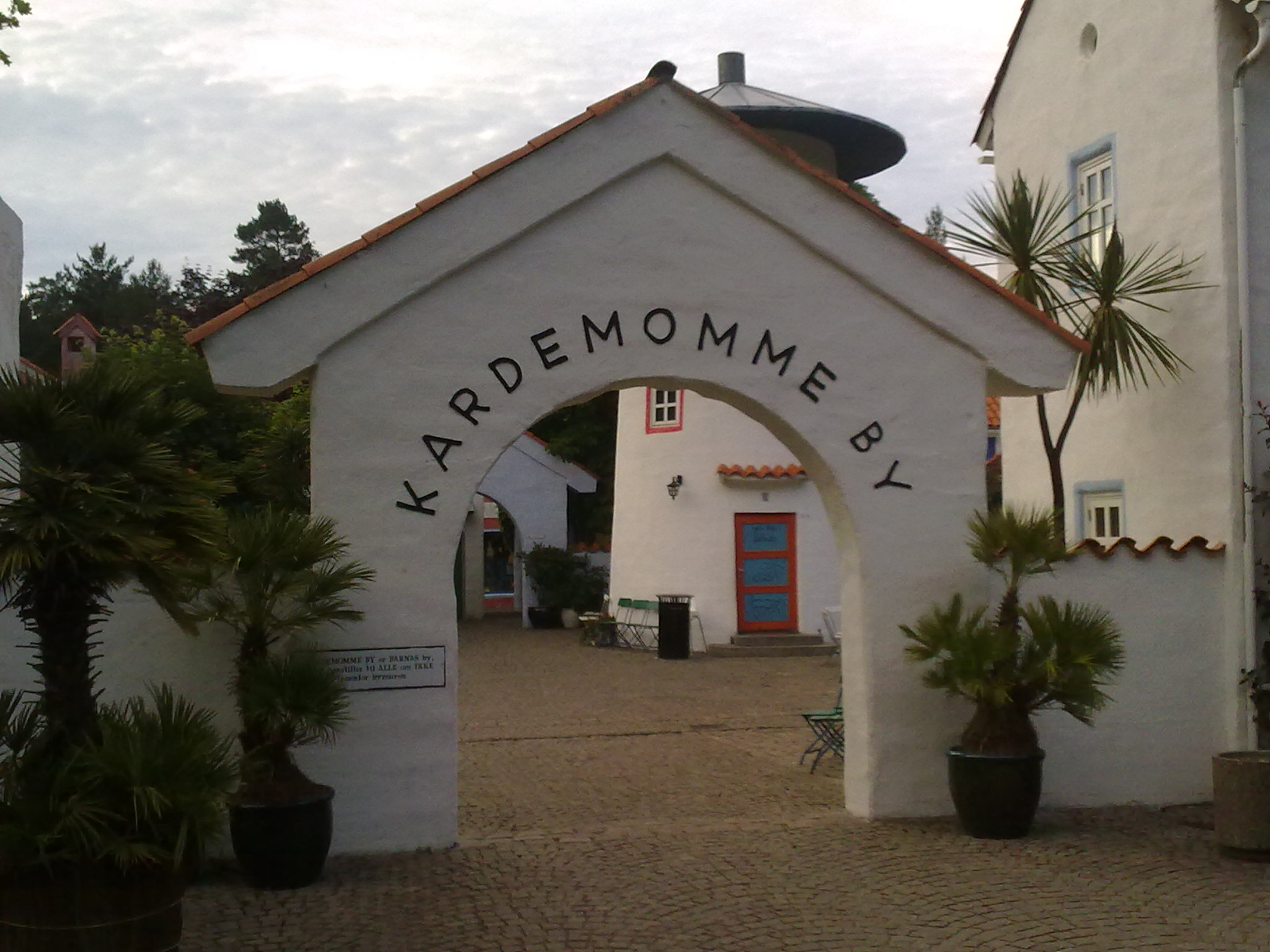
- The main entrance to the Cardamom Town theme park

General information
- Location: Kristiansand, Norway

Cardamom Town (Norwegian: Kardemomme by) is a theme park located within the Kristiansand Zoo in Kristiansand, Norway, based on the popular Norwegian children's book When the Robbers Came to Cardamom Town by Norwegian children’s book author Thorbjørn Egner.

The theme park, which opened in 1991, was made to look exactly like the original illustrations in the book. Thorbjørn Egner saw the theme park while it was under construction, but did not live long enough to see it completed.

The theme park comprises 33 houses, eight of which are rental properties. During the summer actors in the park portray the residents of the fictional town. In addition the visitors of the theme park can see the different main characters in the book: Commissioner Bastian and Aunt Sophie, as well as the three robbers, Kasper, Jesper and Jonathan. The theme park has a working tram made to look like the one in the book and is operated by an actor who portrays the character of tram conductor Syversen. The theme park also has a functioning post office, which uses the postal code "4609 Cardamom Town".

== Notable locations ==
- Tobias' Tower
- Aunt Sophie's House
- Chief Bastian's House
- The town prison
- The robbers' house

== Gallery ==
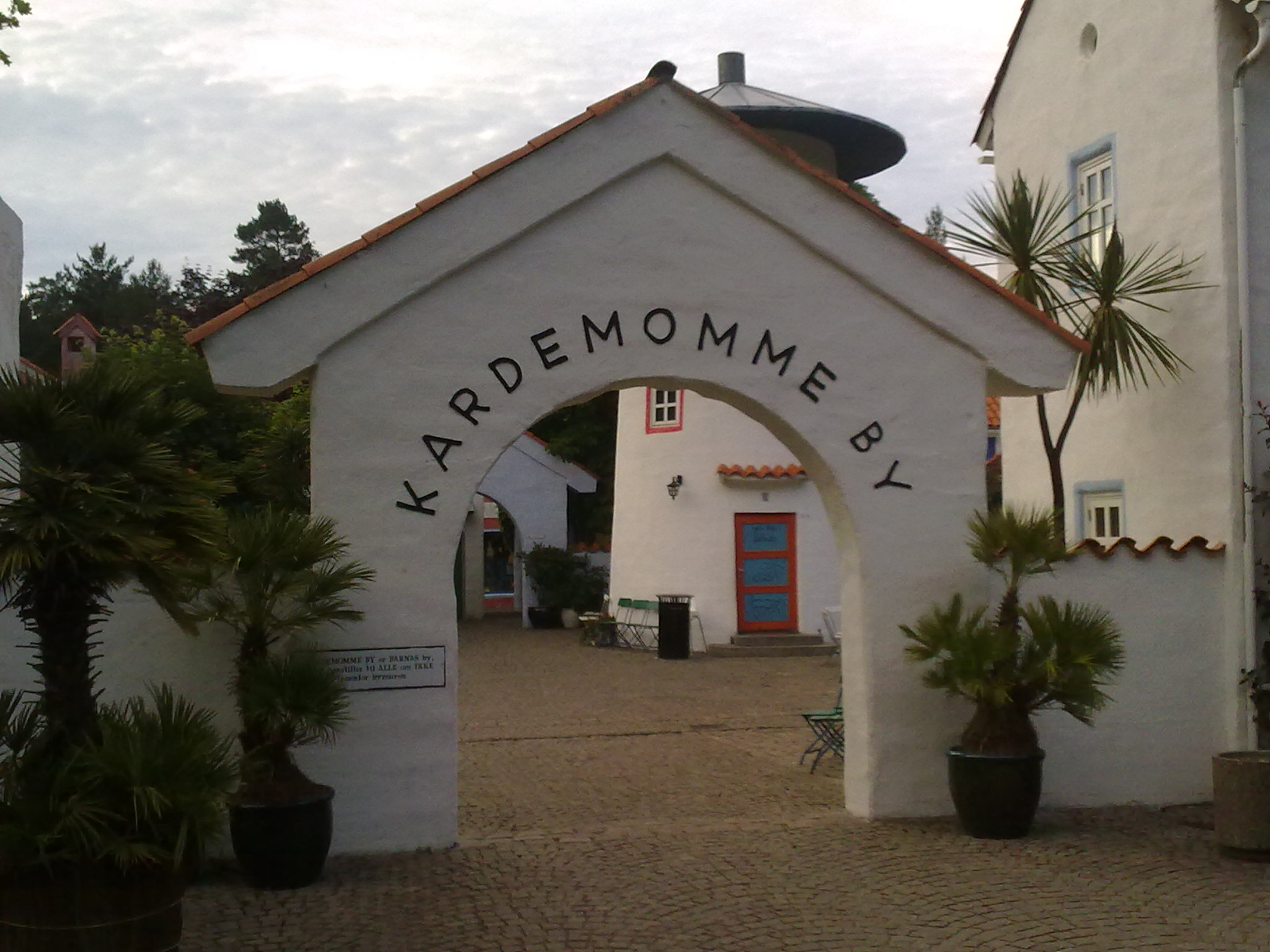
The entrance to Cardamom Town

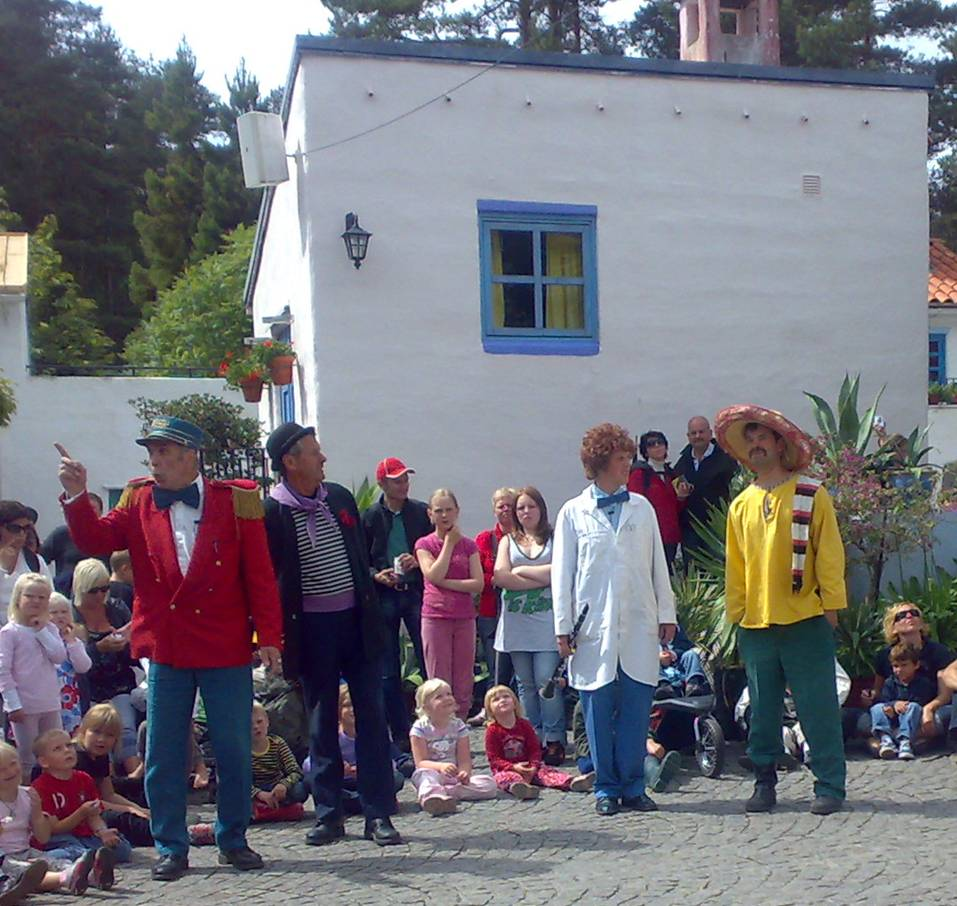
Actors playing the story in front of the visitors

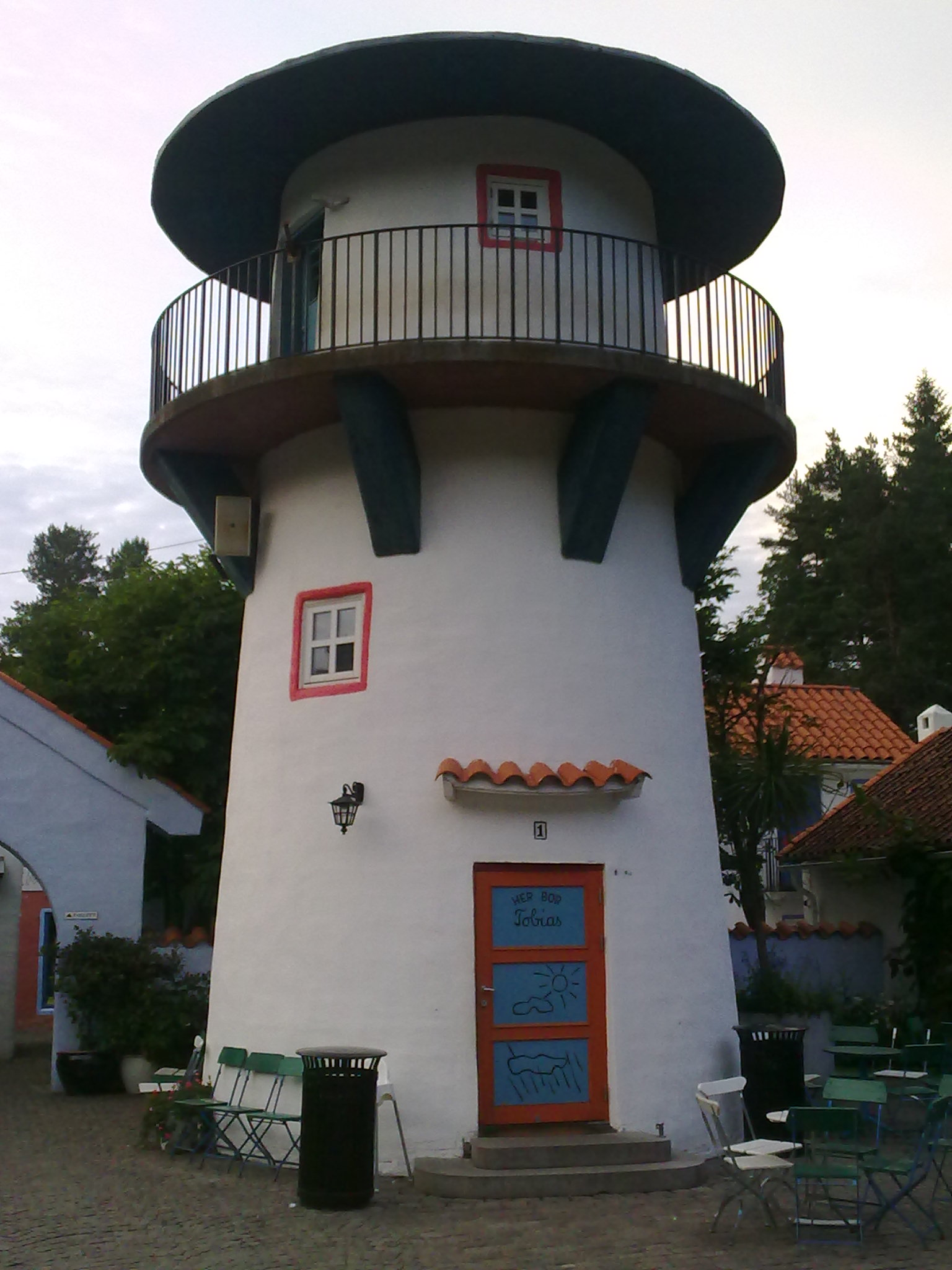
Tobias' Tower

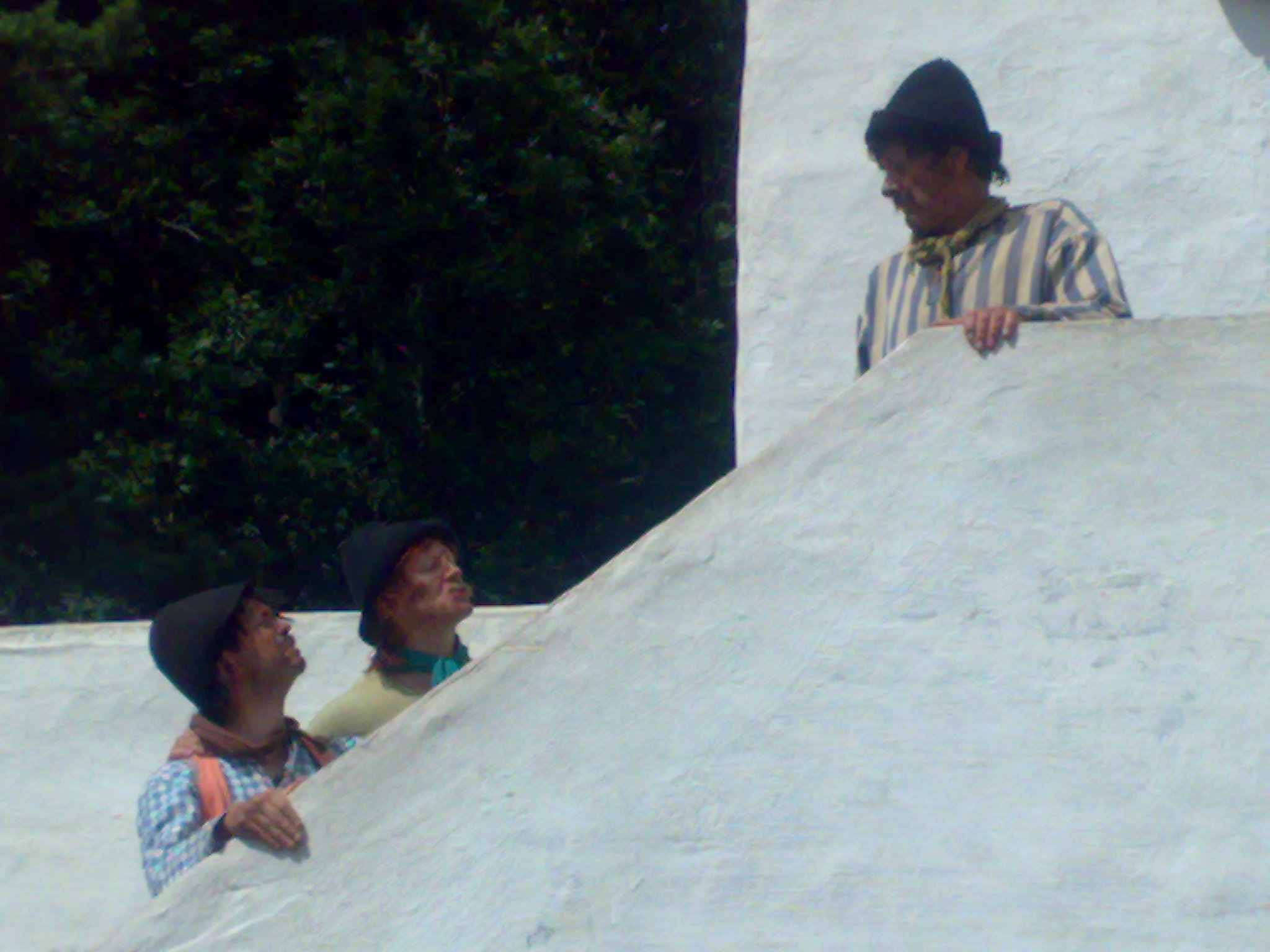
The Robbers Kasper, Jesper and Jonathan in the Kardemomme by

== See also ==
- When the Robbers Came to Cardamom Town
