= Kristiansand Zoo and Amusement Park =

Kristiansand Zoo and Amusement Park Kristiansand Dyrepark
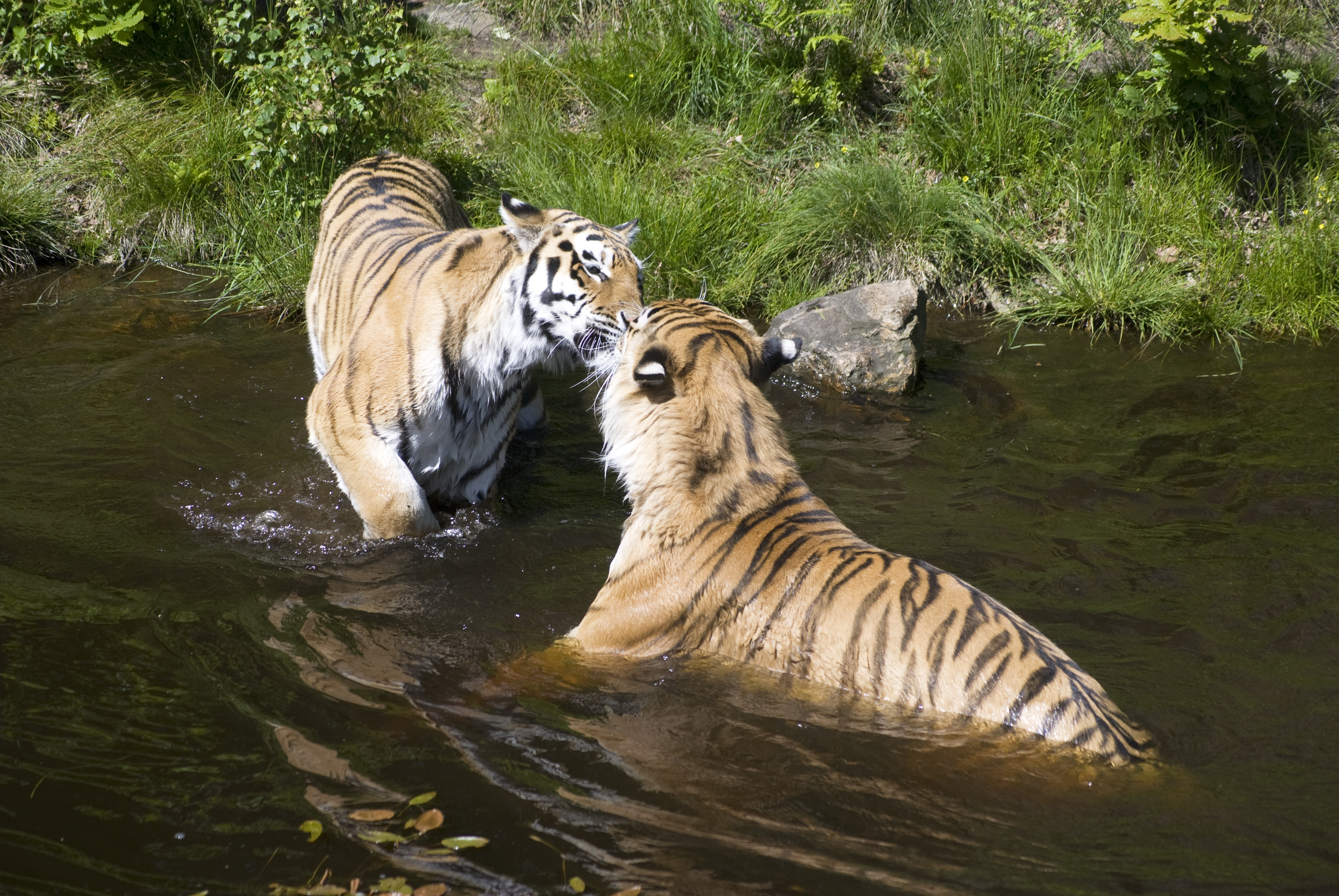
- Siberian tigers swimming at the Zoo
- Interactive map of Kristiansand Zoo and Amusement Park; Kristiansand Dyrepark
- 58.182718°N 8.145923°E
- Date opened: June 26, 1966
- Location: Kristiansand Municipality, Norway
- Land area: 150 acres (61 ha)
- No. of species: 100+
- Annual visitors: 1 026 000 (2015)
- Major exhibits: Several theme park areas
- Owner: Braganza
- Website: www.dyreparken.com

The Kristiansand Zoo and Amusement Park (Norwegian: Kristiansand Dyrepark) is a zoological garden and amusement park situated in Kristiansand Municipality in Agder county, Norway. It is located in the Sørlandsparken area east of the city of Kristiansand. It is Norway's most frequently visited attraction, covering an area of 60 hectares (150 acres). Established in 1966, it has been owned by Braganza since 2004.

The Kristiansand Zoo and Amusement Park has Norway's largest collection of animals. It consists of over a hundred species of animals from around the world, that move freely on a relatively large area.

Amusement attractions include Cardamom Town (Norwegian: Kardemomme by), which is made to look like the town in the book by Thorbjørn Egner, and Captain Sabertooth and pirate village Abra Havn (Abra Harbor), which is taken from a theatre act by the singer and actor Terje Formoe.

== History ==
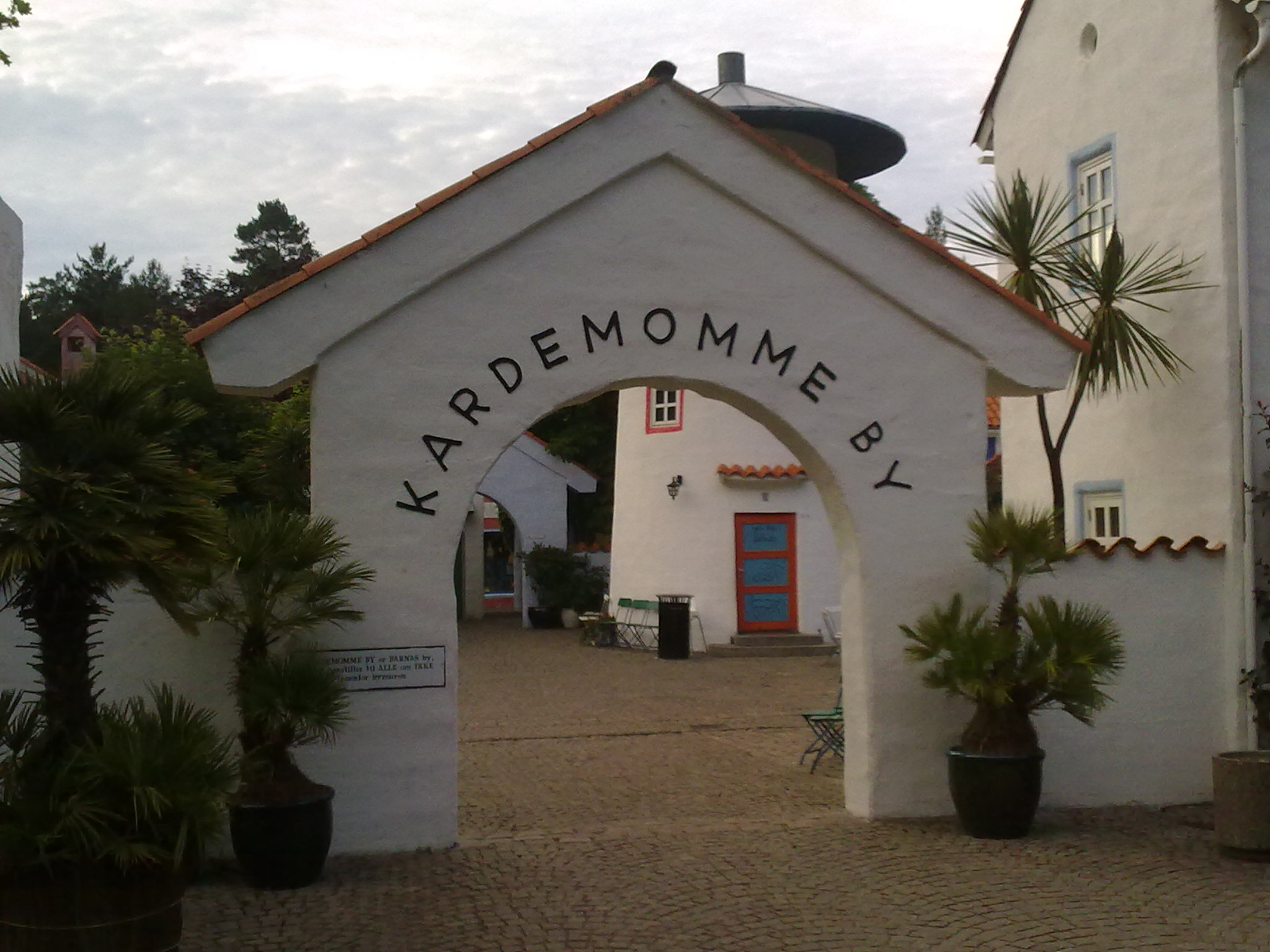
Cardamom Town

The operating company was listed on the Oslo Stock Exchange in 1993. Ludv. G. Braathens Rederi became a partial owner in 1996. Its successor company Braganza gradually bought up shares until reaching a forty-percent stake in 2004. That year it made a successful deal to buy the entire company and the company was subsequently delisted.

== The zoo ==
The zoo department of the park contains animals from different climate conditions, from all over the world. There are built own houses for animals that are sensitive to cold weather. Animals from the Nordic countries are located in a separate department. The collection of animals in the park is the largest in Norway and the animals have relatively large spaces to move around.

=== Animals ===
- Nordic wilderness - Nordic animals like wolves, wolverines, Arctic foxes, lynxes and moose.
- Tropical department - area with snakes, crocodiles, tortoises and frogs. As well the chimpanzee Julius and many other apes in the trees.
- Africa - African animals like zebras, cheetahs, ostriches and African wild dogs
- Asia - Asian animals like Siberian tigers, leaf monkeys, orangutans, gibbons and red pandas.
- Heia - Area that includes various types of flowers like daisies.
- KuToppen - opened in 2009, this is an area with regular Norwegian farm animals, based on the children's TV series with the same name.

Some of the animals in the zoo department (Gallery):

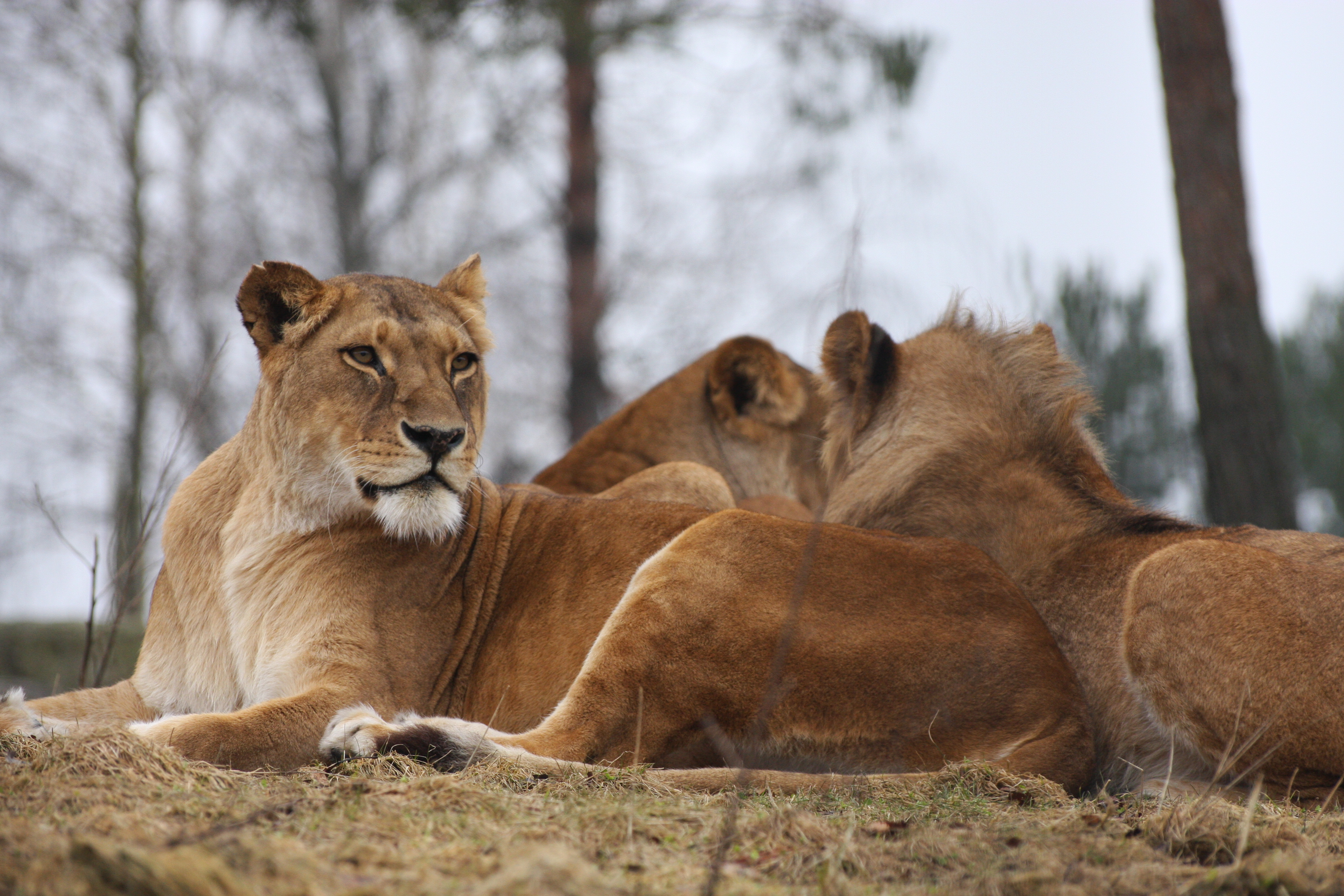
Lions

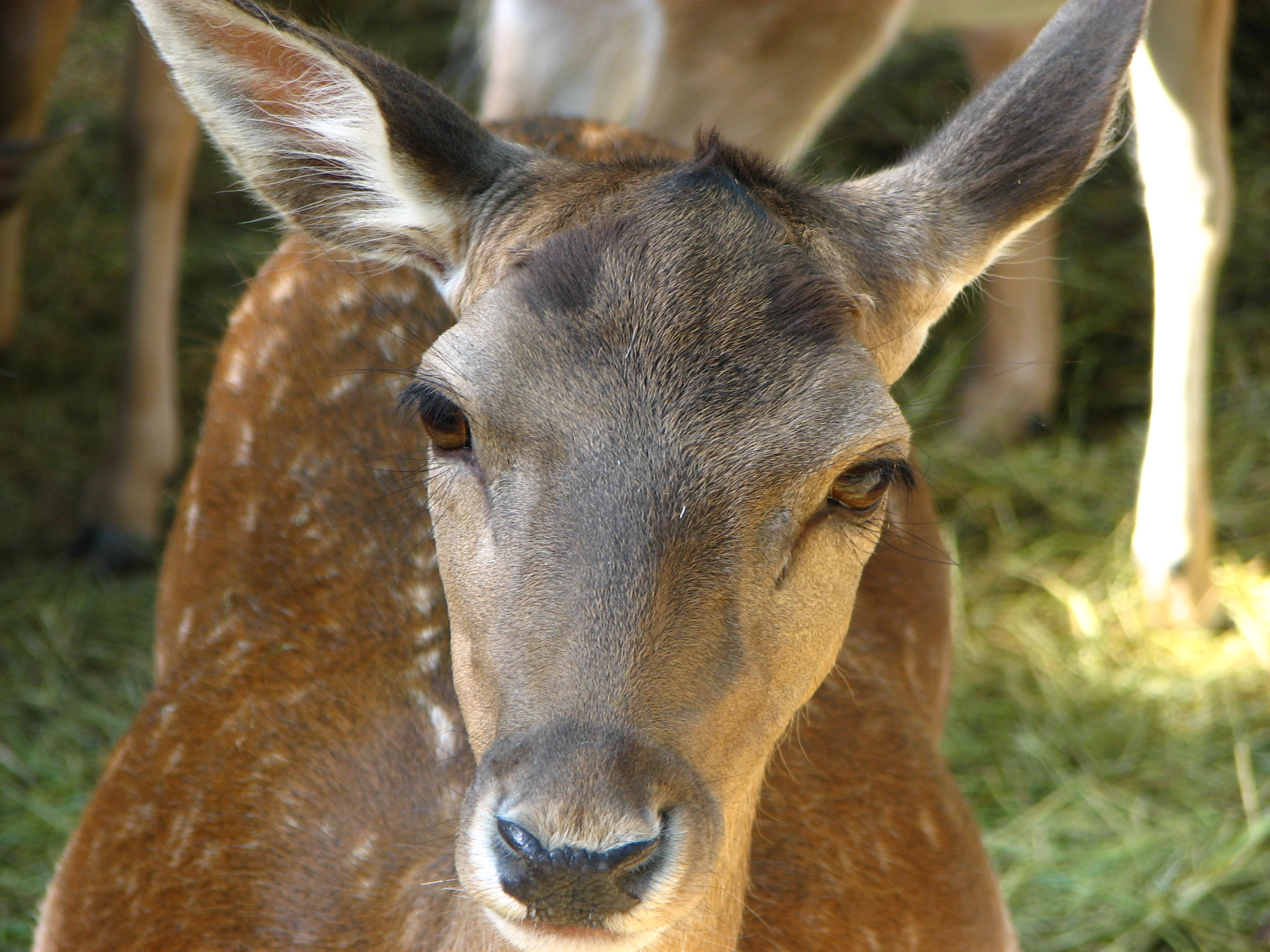
European fallow deer

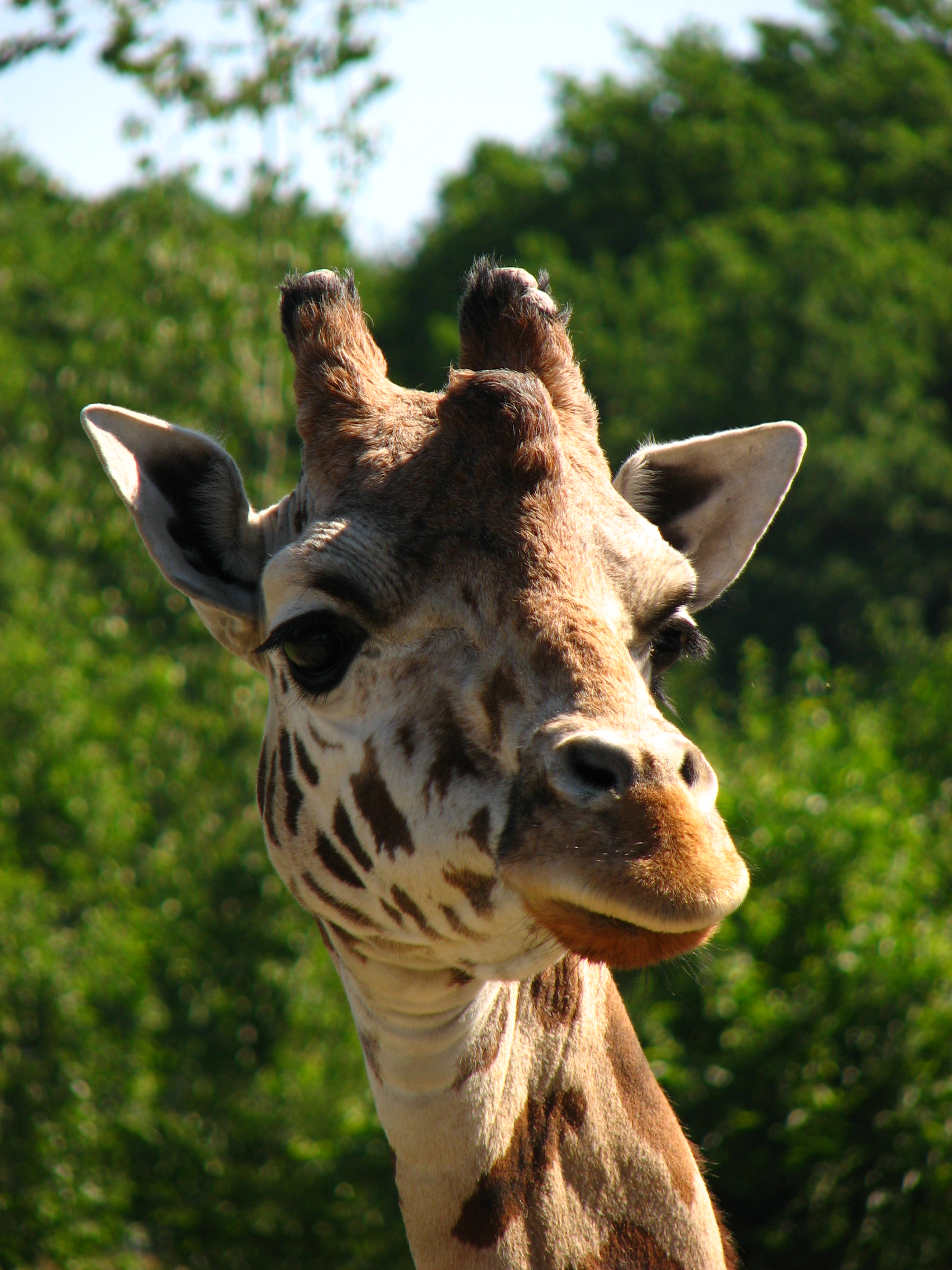
Reticulated giraffe

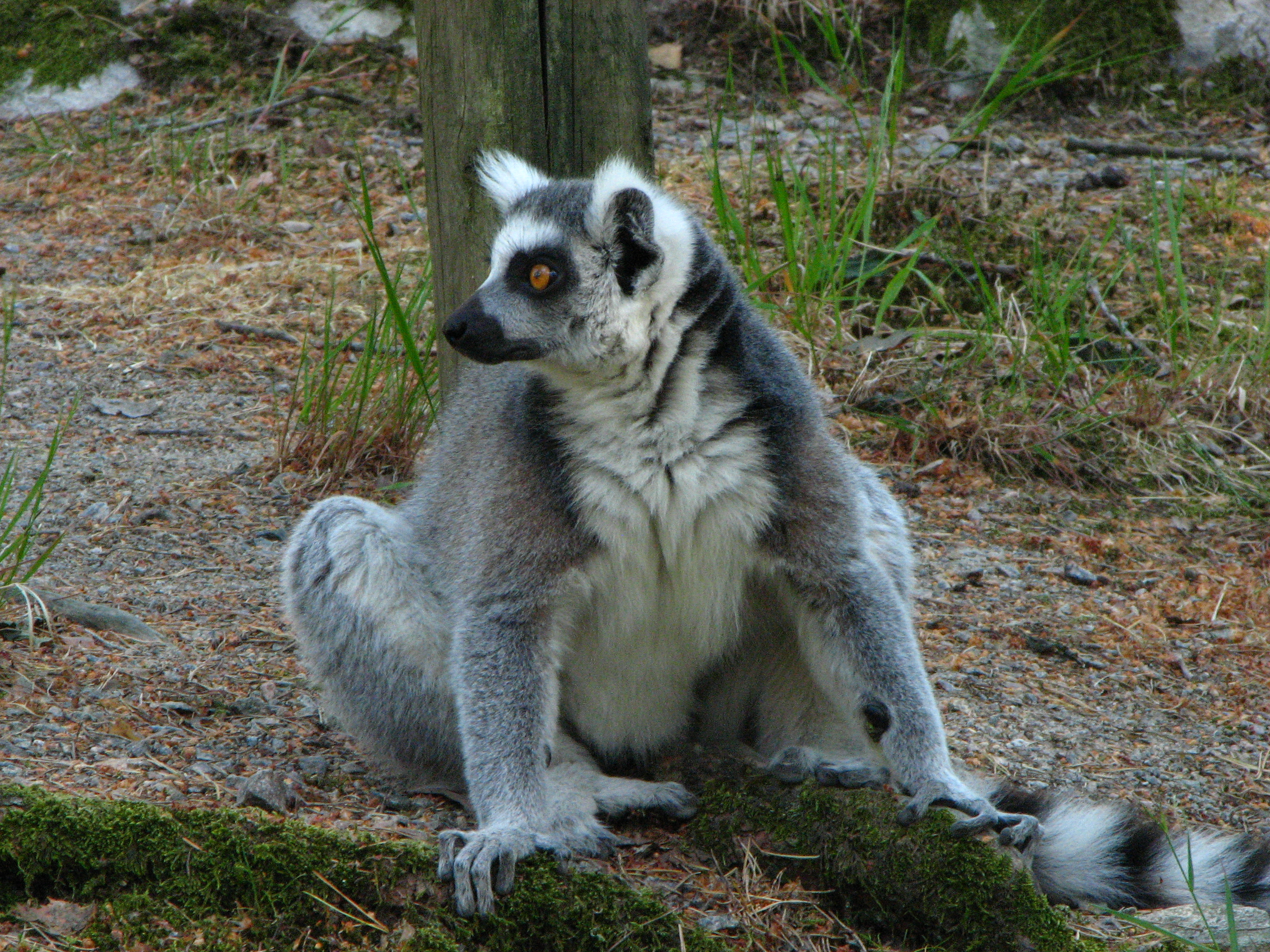
Ring-tailed lemur

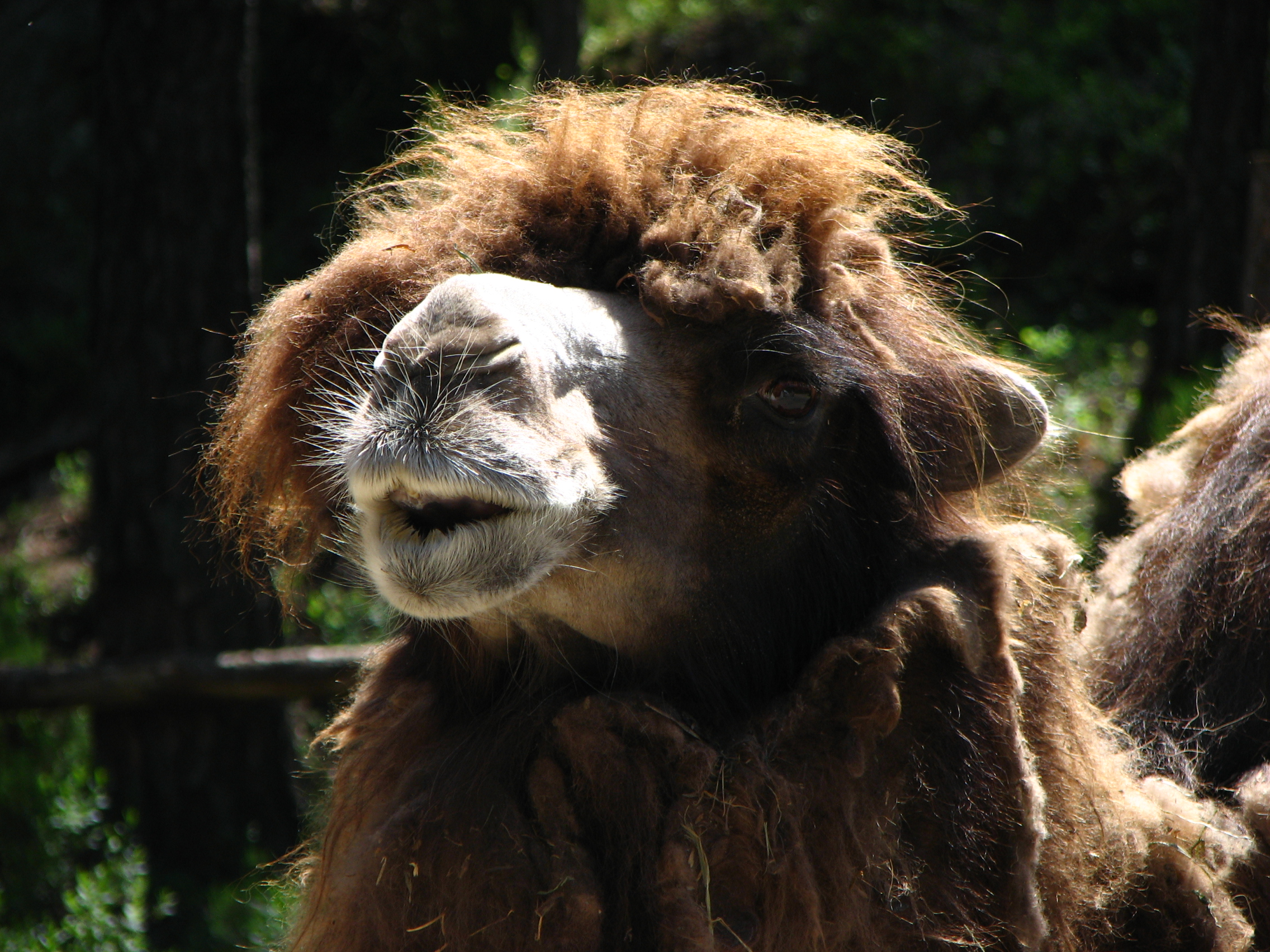
Bactrian camel

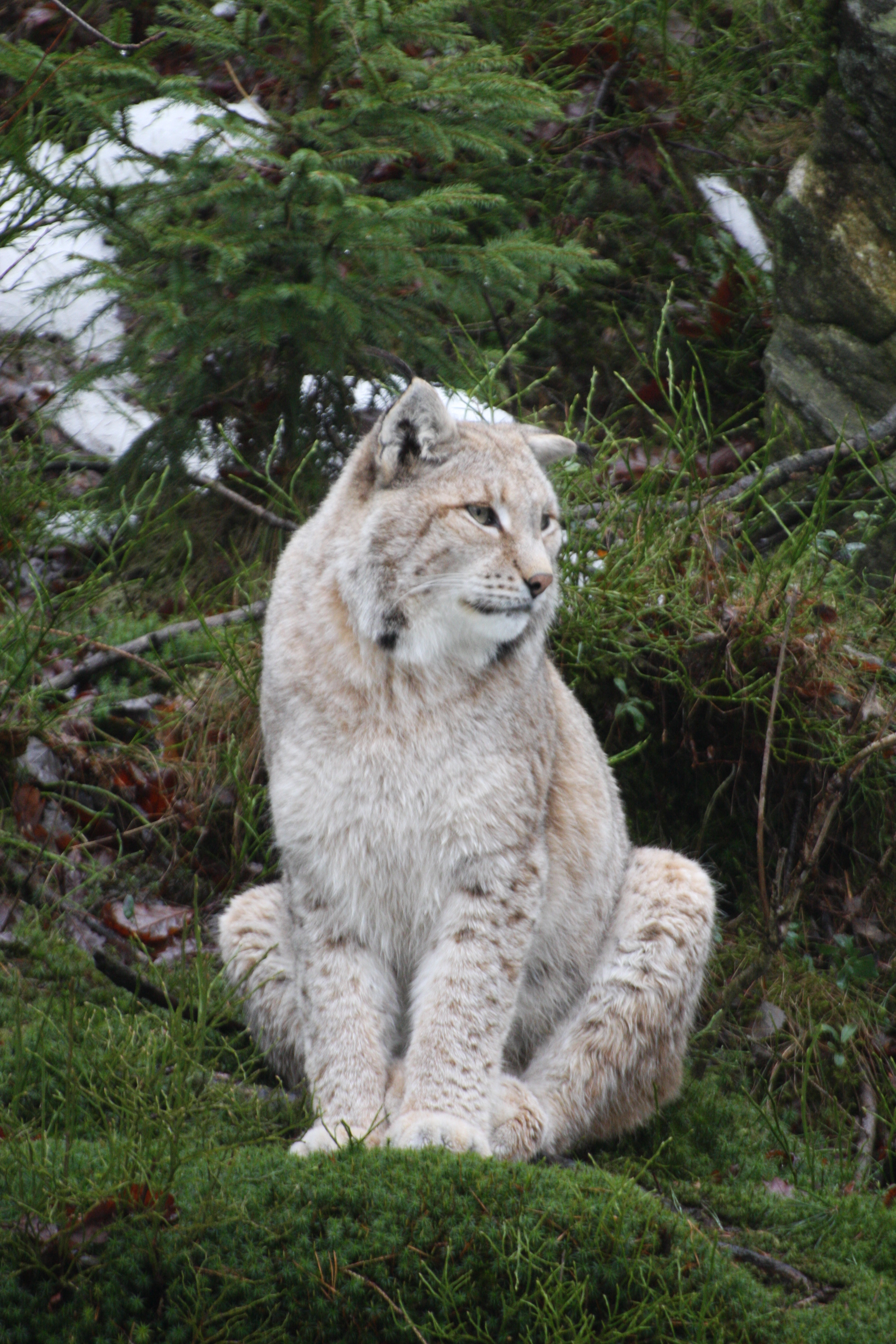
Eurasian lynx

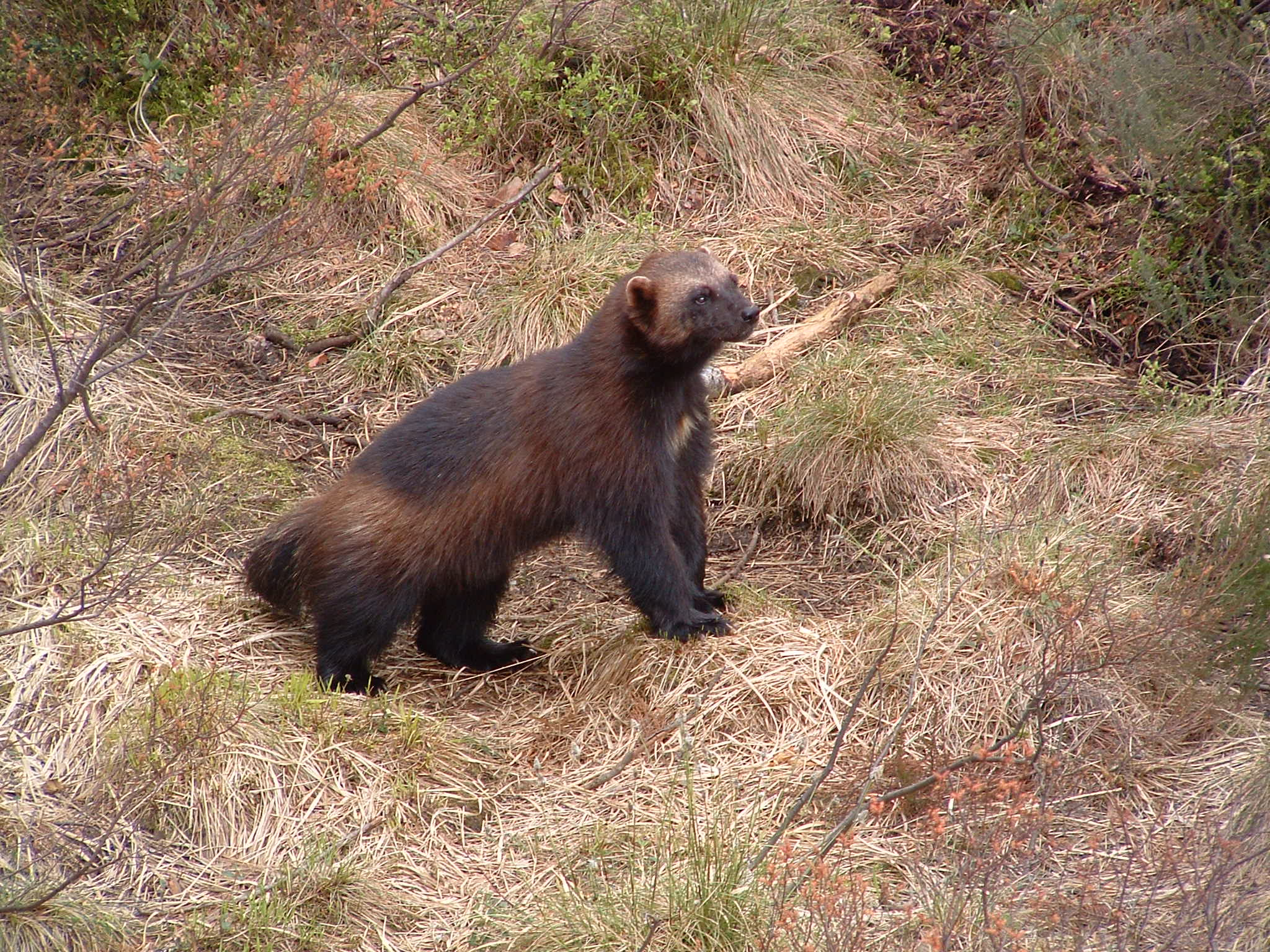
Wolverine

== Cardemom Town ==
Cardemom Town showcases a weather forecast tower, police office, bakery, small shops and a tram line with a singing tram driver. The park is also the subject of a story by Norwegian author Thorbjørn Egner. It is possible to sleep over in this part of the park. In the high season there are theatrical performances in Norwegian.

== Captain Sabertooth World ==
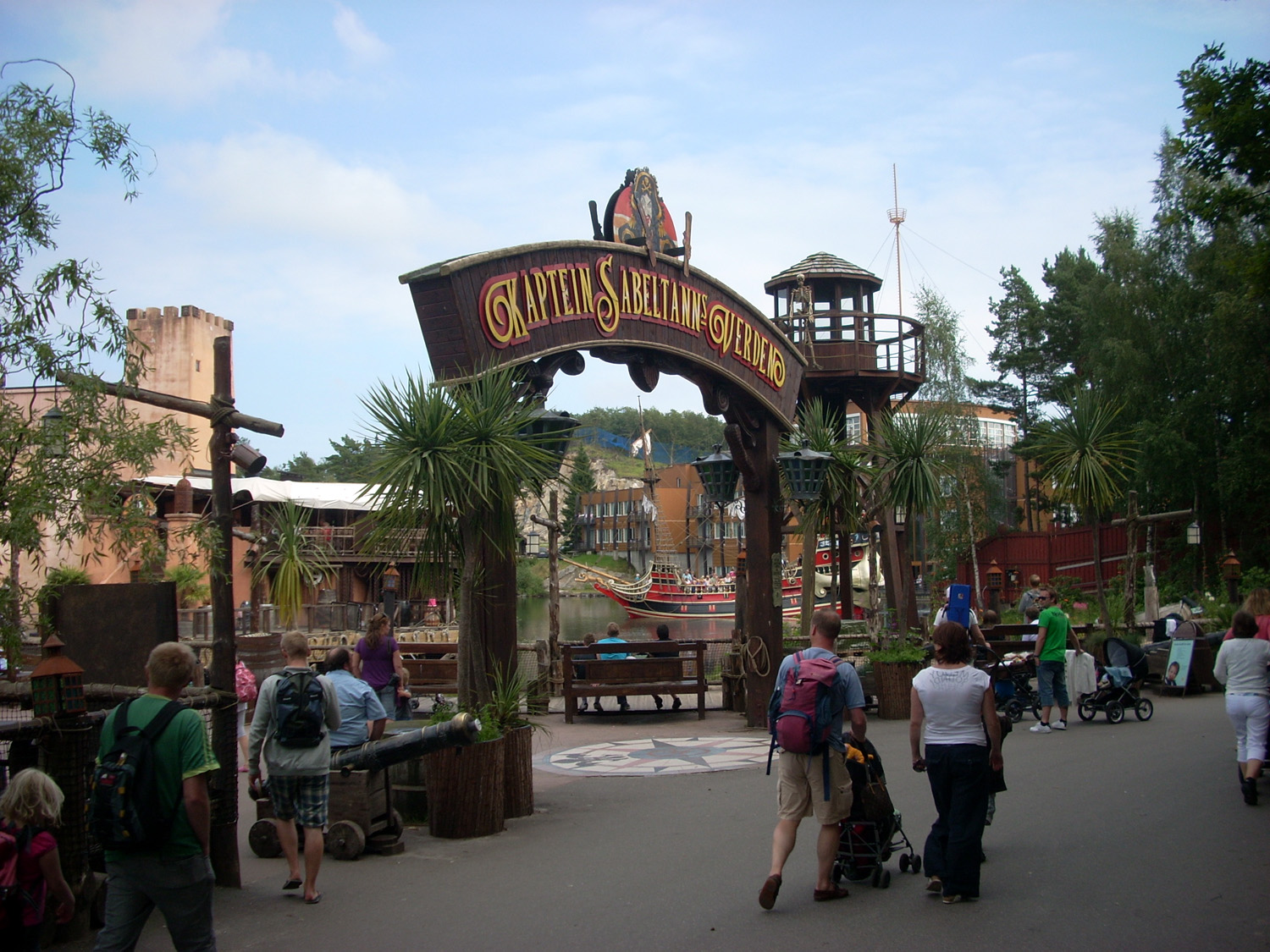
The gates to Captain Sabertooth World

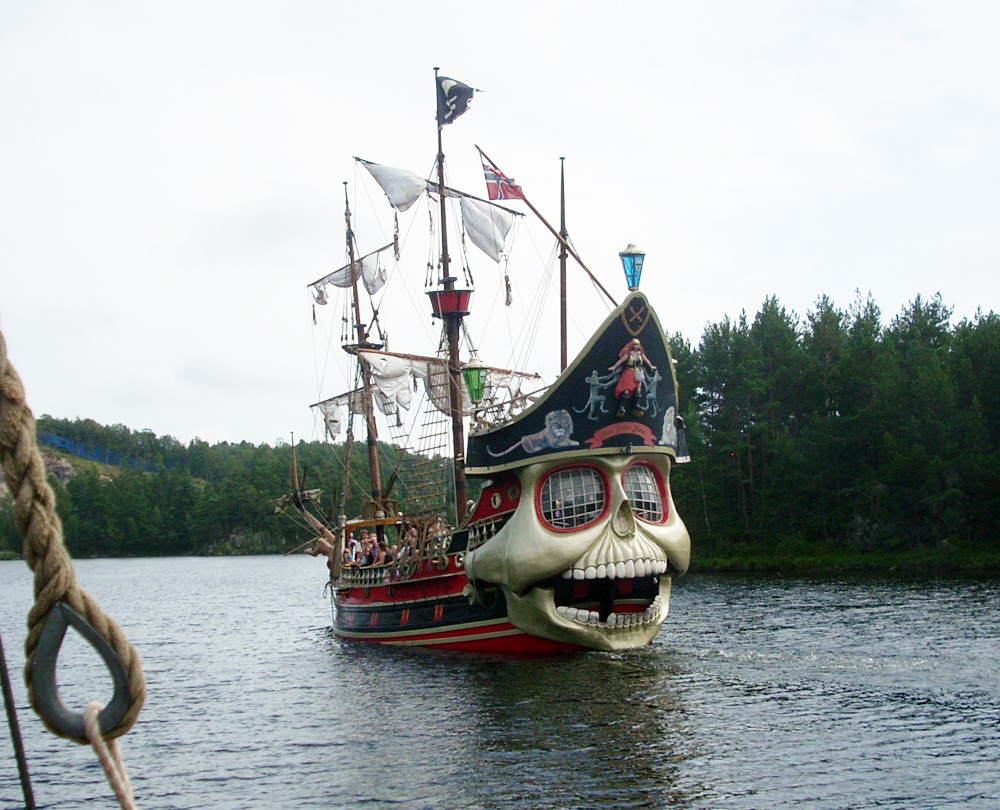
The pirate ship The Black Lady

In 1995 a Captain Sabertooth themed section of the Kristiansand Zoo and Amusement Park was opened. The area has a pirate village theme and contains various attractions, restaurants, and shops that are centered around the character. In the summer the park holds several shows and features, including one that allows guests to ride on Sabertooth's ship The Black Lady (in Norwegian: Den sorte dame).

=== Attractions ===
- Kaptein Sabeltanns skattkammer, a small exhibition of treasures and weapons from the Captain Sabertooth stories.
- Miriams forheksede hus and Grusomme Gabriels gang, two haunted house attractions.
- Smokkariumet, a small room in the Captain Sabertooth castle where children that have stopped using pacifiers can place them in a coffin along with those left by others.
- Sjøslag på Grashavet, a daily event where The Black Lady and the Countess will battle each other.

=== Restaurants ===
- Sjørøvergrill, a pirate-themed grill restaurant located next to the Kaptein Sabeltanns skattkammer.
- Piratproviant, a kiosk that serves hamburgers and french fries.
- Pizzabakeriet, a sit-down pizza restaurant located in the Pirate Theater.
- Kanelbakeriet, a bakery located within the pizza restaurant.
- Hevnen er SØT, a small storefront that sells cotton candy, Ice cream and popcorn.

=== Shops ===
- Havnehandelen, a port-themed shop that sells Sabertooth-themed merchandise.
- Benjamins Bengalske Bazar, a shop that sells general pirate-themed merchandise.
- Kaptein Sabeltanns Sjørøvermagasin, a shop that sells costumes.
- Kapteinens Karibiske Marked, a shop that sells books and DVDs.
- Maga Khans Marked, a shop that sells bags, hats, and other merchandise.

=== The pirate village ===
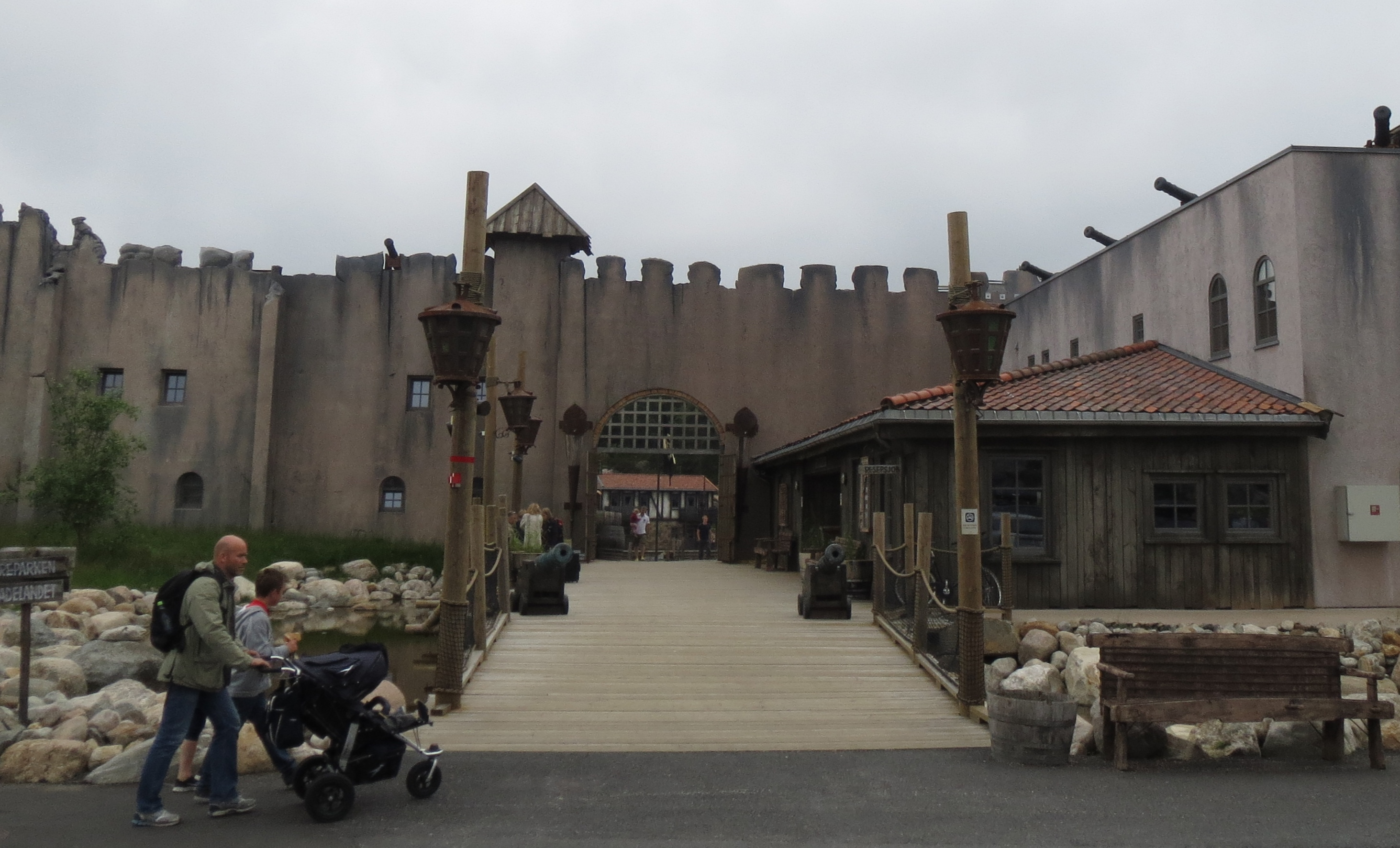
The entrance to the pirate village of Abra Havn

- Abra Havn, a scenic pirate village surrounded by tall walls.
- Accommodation in family apartments.

== Badelandet water park ==
This water park is affiliated with the area, but it requires a separate ticket. Here are water slides in many varieties both indoor and outdoor, swimming pools and a separate beach. The water park is open from mid-May to mid-September.
