= Julius (chimpanzee) =

Chimpanzee living in Norway (born 1979)

- Species: Common chimpanzee
- Sex: Male
- Born: December 26, 1979 (age 46)
- Known for: Living with the family of Edvard Moseid
- Residence: Kristiansand Zoo and Amusement Park, Norway

Julius (born 26 December 1979) is a chimpanzee at Kristiansand Zoo and Amusement Park in Norway. As an infant, Julius was rejected by his mother, and was eventually adopted by the family of Edvard Moseid, the director of the zoo. The baby chimpanzee became the subject of a children's documentary on the Norwegian Broadcasting Corporation in 1981, and was soon the park's most popular attraction.

As Julius grew older and became more aggressive, efforts were made to reintegrate him with the flock. However, initial attempts failed, necessitating Julius's isolation. The Zoo then decided to construct a separate facility where Julius could live alone, apart from the other chimpanzees. Over time, Julius was paired with several female chimpanzees, resulting in the births of his sons, Julius Jr. in 2003 and Linus in 2005, each from different females. Julius remained separated from the main social group until Champis, the group's leader, died in 2005. Following Champis's death, Julius was readmitted to the group. Despite some initial challenges, he ultimately succeeded in becoming the new leader of the group.

== Reunited with the group ==
Julius has remained the leader of the group of chimpanzees held at the Zoo since 2005. He became a father for the third time when his daughter Yr was born in 2011; the following year, Linus died at the age of 5, after falling into a water ditch surrounding the outdoors enclosure. In 2019, a DNA-test confirmed that Julius belongs to a sub-group of chimpanzees, the West-African Chimpanzees. As a result of this, in the future, the Zoo hopes that Julius' social group may be strengthened with an additional one or two females of the same sub-group, and that Julius may father further offspring that can be integrated into conservation programs in the efforts to conserve the species.

== Song ==
In 1983 Terje Formoe wrote the song Her kommer Julius (here comes Julius), which was used as the theme the NRK program about the chimpanzee, and became a hit, winning Norsktoppen.

== See also ==
- List of individual apes
