= Jens Rolfsen =

Norwegian merchant and politician (1765–1819)

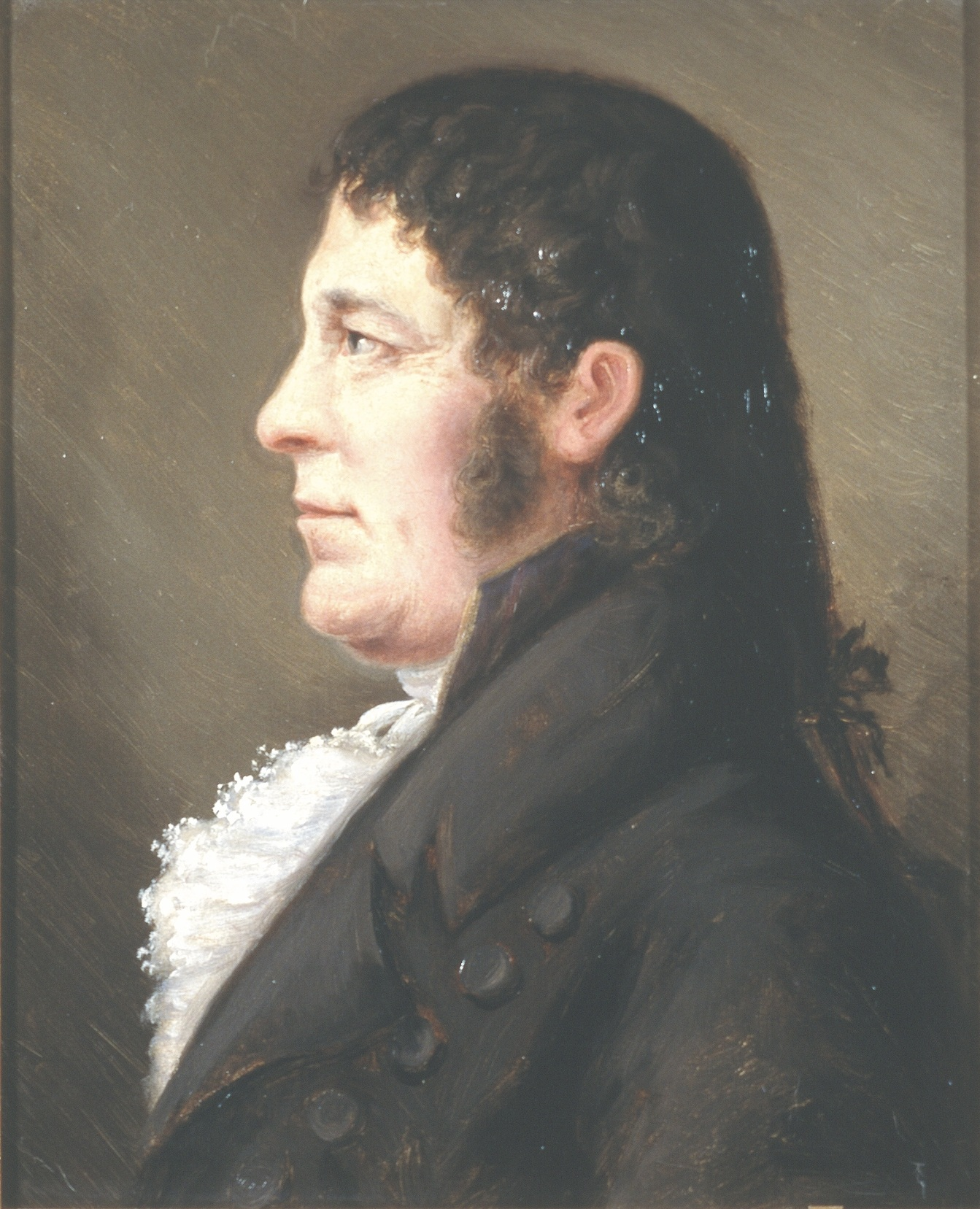

Norwegian Constitutional Assembly
- In office 1814–1814

Personal details
- Born: 24 July 1765 Kristiansand, Norway
- Died: 17 December 1819 (aged 54)
- Spouse: Mette Johansdatter Brun (1774–1844)
- Relations: Nordahl Rolfsen (grandson); Alf Rolfsen (great-grandson)
- Occupation: politician and merchant

Jens Rolfsen (24 July 1765 – 17 December 1819) was a Norwegian merchant and politician.

Rolfsen was born in Kristiansand. He was a shipbuilder, shipmaster, shipowner and wholesaler. He later served as conciliation commissioner in Bergen. He represented Bergen (Bergens Bys) at the Norwegian Constituent Assembly at Eidsvoll in 1814. He generally favored the Independence Party (Selvstendighetspartiet) as did his fellow representatives Wilhelm Frimann Koren Christie, Fredrik Meltzer and Jonas Rein.

He was married to Mette Johansdatter Brun (1774-1844) and was the grandfather of Nordahl Rolfsen and grand-grandfather of Alf Rolfsen.
