= Karius and Bactus =

1949 children's book by Thorbjørn Egner

- First edition
- Author: Thorbjørn Egner
- Original title: Karius og Baktus
- Translators: Mike Sevig and Turi Olderheim
- Illustrator: Thorbjørn Egner
- Language: Norwegian
- Genre: Children's literature, fantasy
- Published: 1949
- Publisher: Gyldendal, Cappelen
- Publication place: Norway

Karius and Bactus (Norwegian: Karius og Baktus) is a Norwegian children's novel written and illustrated by playwright Thorbjørn Egner. The book was first published in 1949 and produced as a 15-minute puppet animation film by film director Ivo Caprino in 1955. An English translation by Mike Sevig and Turi Olderheim was published in the United States in 1986.

The main characters are Karius (black haired) and Bactus (red haired). Their names are puns on Caries and Bacteria, and they are two small "tooth trolls" that live inside cavities in the teeth of a boy named Jens. They have a very good life, especially when Jens eats white bread with syrup and fails to brush his teeth afterwards. Eventually their homes are destroyed by the work of a dentist and they are rinsed out of Jens' mouth through proper dental care.

The story of Karius and Bactus, with its humorous illustrations and important message, has become a classic of Norwegian children's literature. Since its publication, the idea of "tooth trolls" has been used as a pedagogical device for generations of Scandinavian children.

== Other sources ==
- Thorbjørn Egner (1971), Karius og Baktus (Oslo: Cappelen) ISBN 978-8202031671
