= Nordahl Rolfsen =

Norwegian teacher and journalist (1848–1928)

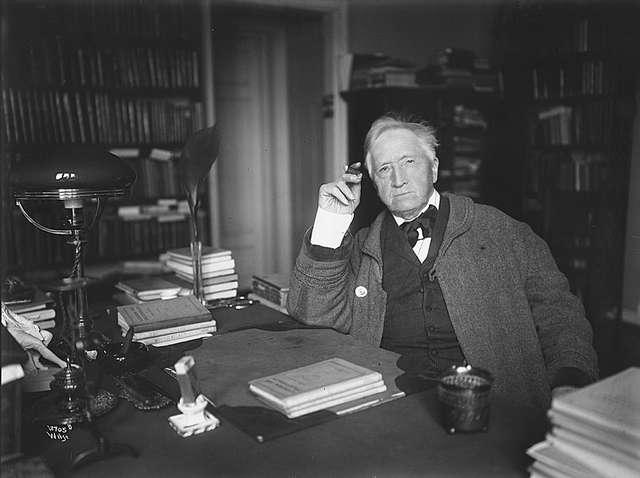
- Rolfsen in 1919
- Born: 12 June 1848; Bergen, Norway
- Died: 18 January 1928 (aged 79)
- Occupations: Teacher; Journalist; Translator; Magazine editor Educationalist
- Notable work: Læsebog for folkeskolen, a series of five readers for elementary school which became the most widespread schoolbook in Norway
- Children: Alf Rolfsen
- Relatives: Johan Nordahl Brun (great-grandfather)
- Awards: Order of St. Olav

Johan Nordahl Brun Rolfsen (12 June 1848 – 18 January 1928) was a Norwegian writer, educationalist and teacher, journalist, translator and speaker. He is best known for the series of five readers for elementary school, Læsebog for folkeskolen (1892–1895), which became the most widely-used schoolbook in Norway.

== Family ==
Rolfsen was born in Bergen. His parents were merchant and later bank teller Rasmus Rolfsen and Jannikke Brun. He was great-grandson of poet and bishop of Bjørgvin Johan Nordal Brun, and grandson of shipmaster, shipowner and member of the Norwegian Constitutional Assembly Jens Rolfsen. He married Hedevig Martha Hastrup Birch in 1885. He was the father of painter Alf Rolfsen.

== Early life ==
Rolfsen finished his education at Bergen Cathedral School in 1866, and continued his studies in Christiania. He worked as a teacher at Aars og Voss' skole from 1870 to 1872 and at Frøken Falsens pikeskole from 1873 to 1876. He issued his collection of poetry and stories, Under Sneen, in 1874. In 1877 he moved to Bergen, working as an instructor at the theatre Den Nationale Scene. He became determined to be a dramatist, and travelled to Denmark where two of his plays were performed, Ved Solnedgang (1878, Copenhagen) and En Valkyrie (1880, Copenhagen). During the 1880s he experimented with different literary genres. He edited the children's magazine Illustreret Tidende for Børn from 1885 to 1894. His musical comedy Svein Uræd (1890), with music by Ole Olsen, was a success on stage.

== Later life ==
In 1890 the Rolfsen family moved from Bergen and settled in Kristiania. Rolfsen had sent an application to the Ministry of Church for funding the writing of new readers for elementary school, but his application was refused after a three-day debate in the Parliament of Norway. Instead he received funding from bookseller and publisher Jacob Dybwad. The readers Læsebog for folkeskolen (Transl. Reading book for primary school) were issued 1892–1895 (five volumes), and were later reissued numerous times. They would become the standard readers in Norwegian elementary schools until Thorbjørn Egners lesebøker took over in the 1950s.

Rolfsen worked as a full-time writer and editor the rest of his life, and also as a translator, journalist, researcher and speaker. In 1894 he issued Læsebog for middelskolen. He was editor of the 1900 two-volume work Norge i det nittende Aarhundrede (Norway in the 19th century).

Rolfsen was leader of the Norwegian Students' Society, and later chairman of the Norwegian Authors' Union. He was decorated Knight, First Class of the Royal Norwegian Order of St. Olav in 1912.
