= Gabriel Moseid =

Norwegian politician

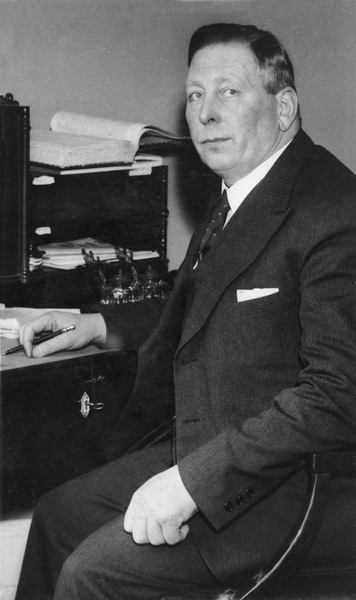
- Gabriel Moseid, c. 1938
- Born: 10 October 1882; Vennesla, Norway
- Died: 4 August 1961 (aged 78); Vennesla
- Occupation: Politician
- Relatives: Edvard Moseid (grandson)

Gabriel Endresen Moseid (10 October 1882 – 4 August 1961) was a Norwegian politician for the Farmers' Party.

He was elected to the Norwegian Parliament from Vest-Agder in 1922, and was re-elected on seven occasions. He had previously served as a deputy representative during the term 1919–1921.

On the local level, Moseid was a member of the municipal council of Vennesla Municipality from 1910 to 1922, serving the last term as mayor.

Originally a member of the Liberal Party, he eventually joined the Farmers' Party who broke out of the Liberal Party in 1922. He sat on the national board of the Farmers' Party from 1922 to 1947.

He was born in Vennesla Municipality. He worked mainly as a farmer, but also bank treasurer from 1915 to 1921. He was later Chairman of the Office of the Auditor General of Norway from 1931 to 1946 and 1947 to 1954.

Moseid was the grandfather of Edvard Moseid.
