= When the Robbers Came to Cardamom Town =

1955 children's book by Thornbjørn Egner

- Danish cover art
- Author: Thorbjørn Egner
- Original title: Folk og røvere i Kardemomme by
- Translator: L. Berg & E. Ramsden
- Illustrator: Thorbjørn Egner
- Language: Norwegian
- Genre: Children's novel
- Publisher: J.W. Cappelens Forlag
- Publication date: 1955
- Publication place: Norway
- English publication date: 1976
- Media type: Print (hardback & paperback)
- ISBN: 978-82-02-13977-3
- OCLC: 30971127

When the Robbers Came to Cardamom Town (Norwegian: Folk og røvere i Kardemomme by) is a 1955 Norwegian children's book written and illustrated by Thorbjørn Egner, which tells the story of Kardemomme (Cardamom Town). It is considered one of the most important works in Norwegian children's literature. The book includes many songs which are connected to the story. The story has been adapted into a play and television program. The criminologist Nils Christie considered that Egner had contributed significantly to criminology in Norway due in part to this book.

== Plot summary ==
The book is about the peaceful town of Kardemomme and the people there, as well as the only characters which stir up serious trouble. They are the three robbers, Casper, Jasper and Jonathan who live outside the town and regularly enter to steal the things they need. The robbers get arrested and are treated well in jail. In the end they are reformed, and in the final chapter, they become the heroes of the day when they extinguish a fire in the tower of the town. Finally, Casper becomes the town's fireman, Jasper becomes the town's circus manager and Jonathan becomes a baker.

== Characters ==
=== Main characters ===
- The Robbers (Casper, Jasper, and Jonathan) (Kasper, Jesper og Jonatan) — loud, prone to quarreling with each other, and live very cluttered. They live in a strange house, with a kind lion to protect them.
- Constable Bastian (Politimester Bastian) — the cheerful policeman who is concerned in making sure that everyone is happy.
- Aunt Sophie (Tante Sofie) — a middle-aged woman who is the aunt of Camomilla (Kamomilla). Sophie is extremely strict, and the only song she sings is "Aunt Sophie's angry song", where she expresses dismay over the horrid state of affairs in the town, and disdain for a number of the people. Regarding Bastian, she sings ("I know Policemen Bastian is always very kind, but conscious constables have punishment in mind"), but Sophie is also a sympathetic character, well-organized and capable of giving sympathy to those who deserve it. The robbers kidnap her to have her do their household chores for them, but soon find themselves regretting it when she takes command and forces the robbers to clean up their hideout and wash themselves, prompting them to send her back home.
- Tobias — the old wise man in the tower with a long beard. His job is to give the town's weather forecast from the balcony of the tower in which he lives.

=== Minor characters ===
- Kamomilla — Aunt Sophie's young niece. She likes to play the piano.
- Tommy — the young son of the merchant/ town orchestra's French horn player.
- Enoksson the Tram driver — runs the city's tram. He also plays in the city orchestra.
- Simonsson the barber — the town's barber. He also plays the clarinet in the city orchestra.
- The butcher, the baker and the merchant — after they eventually get tired of the robberies, they decide to stop the robbers once and for all.
- Polly Parrot — a parrot who sings at the Cardemom Fair.
- Camel — a camel who sings at the Cardemom Fair.

== Music ==
The music, Kardemommeviser, was released on EP in 1955 and LP in 1975.

== Theme park ==
The setting of Kardemomme by was made into part of a theme park in Kristiansand Zoo in 1991. Thorbjørn Egner lived to see the theme park under construction, but not to see it completed.

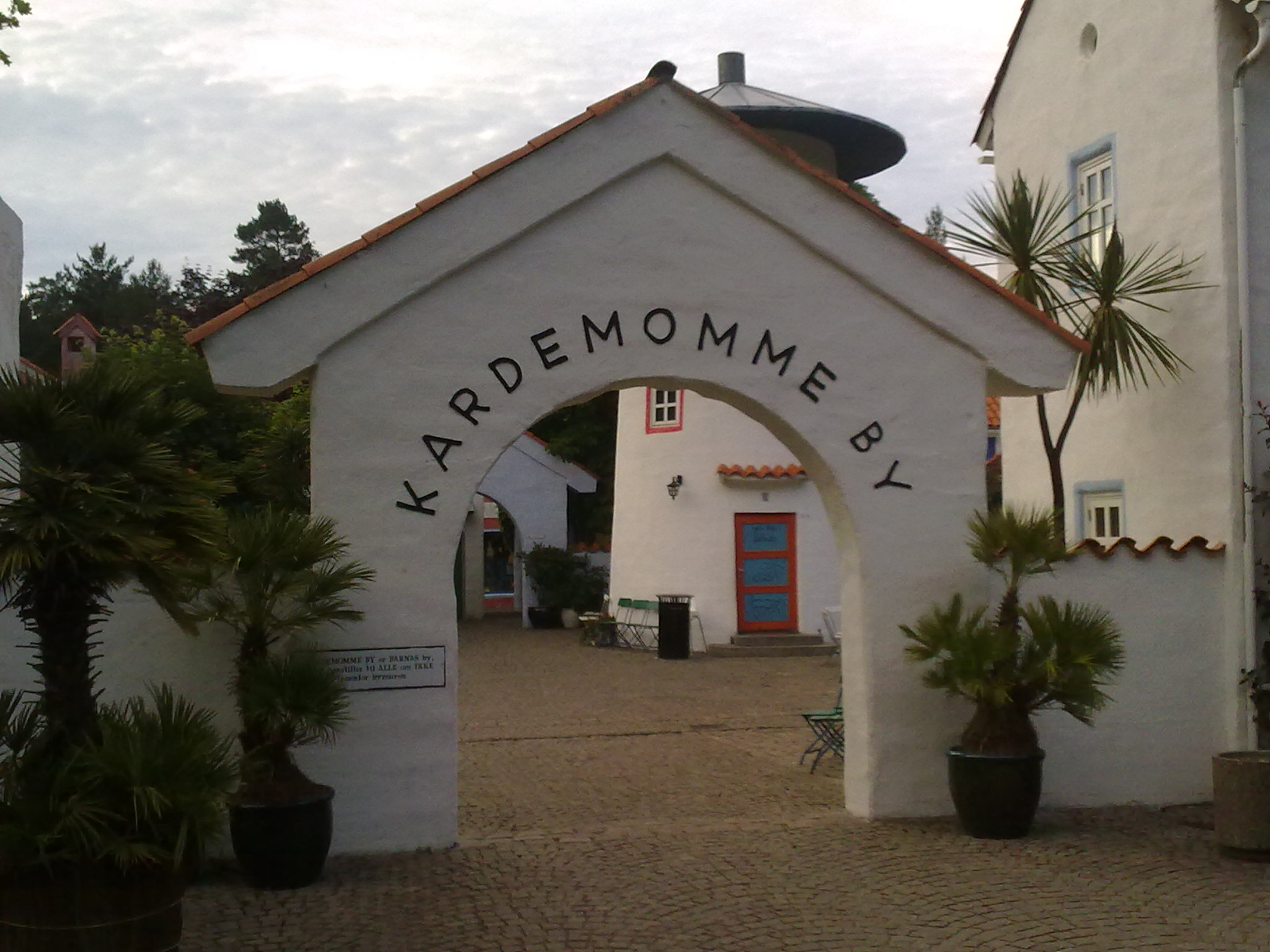
The entrance to the Kardemomme by at Kristiansand Zoo

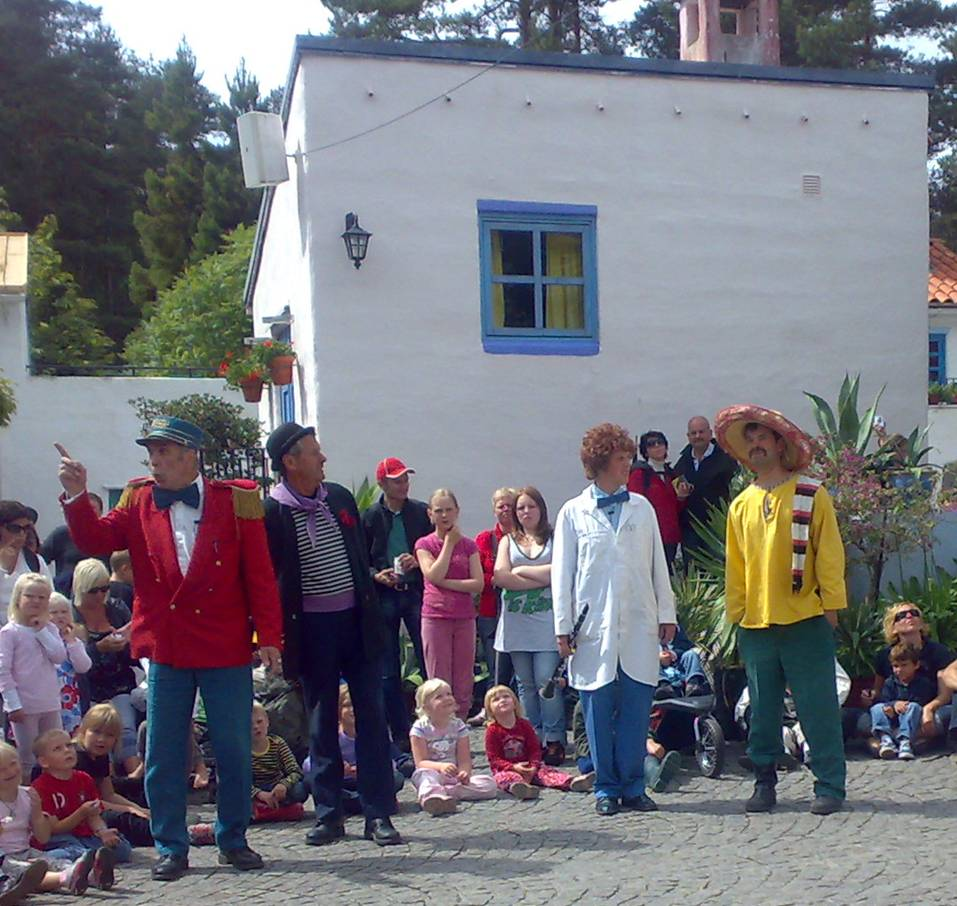
A reenactment of the story in the Kardemomme by

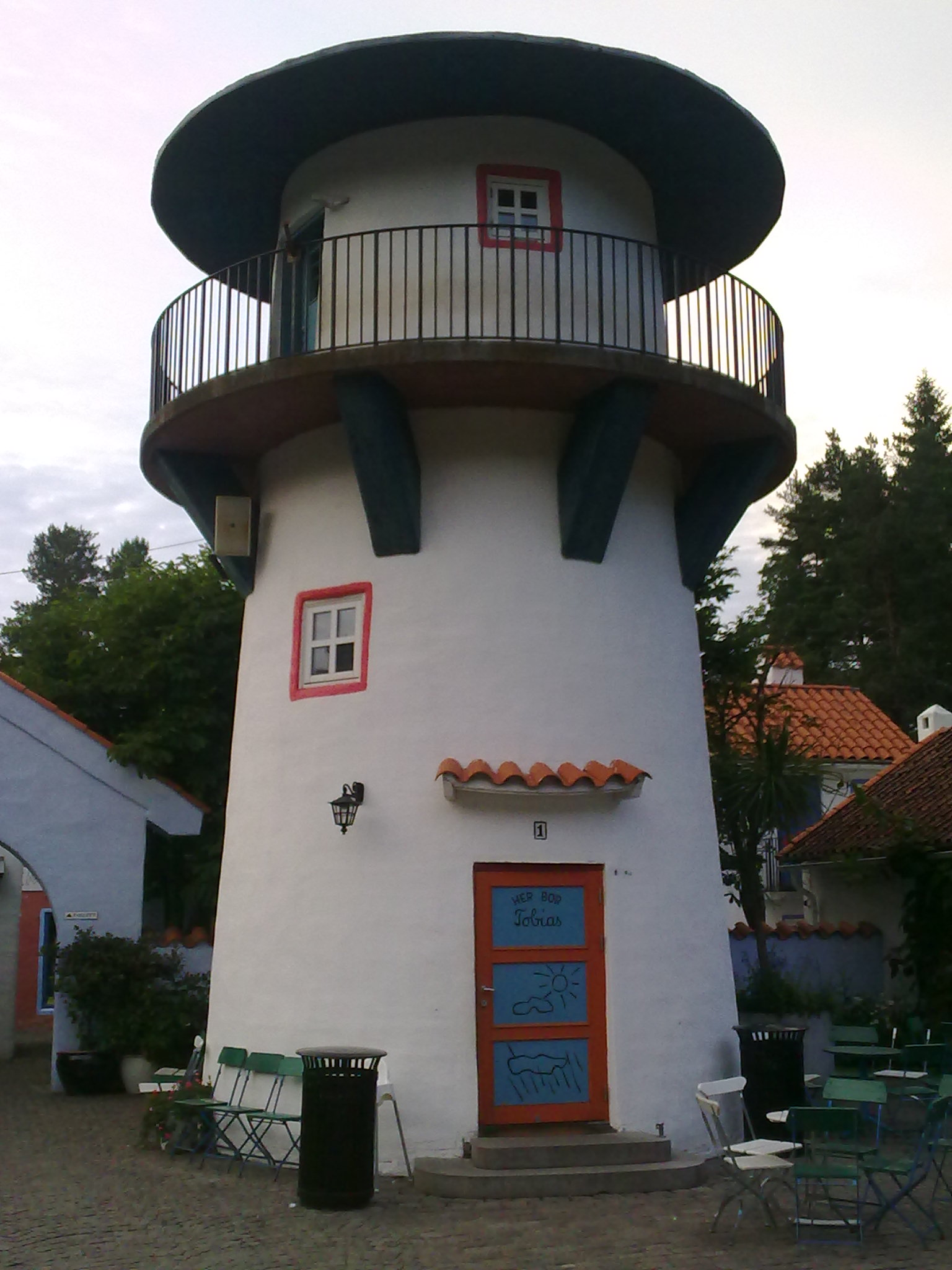
The tower of the old wise man Tobias in the Kardemomme by

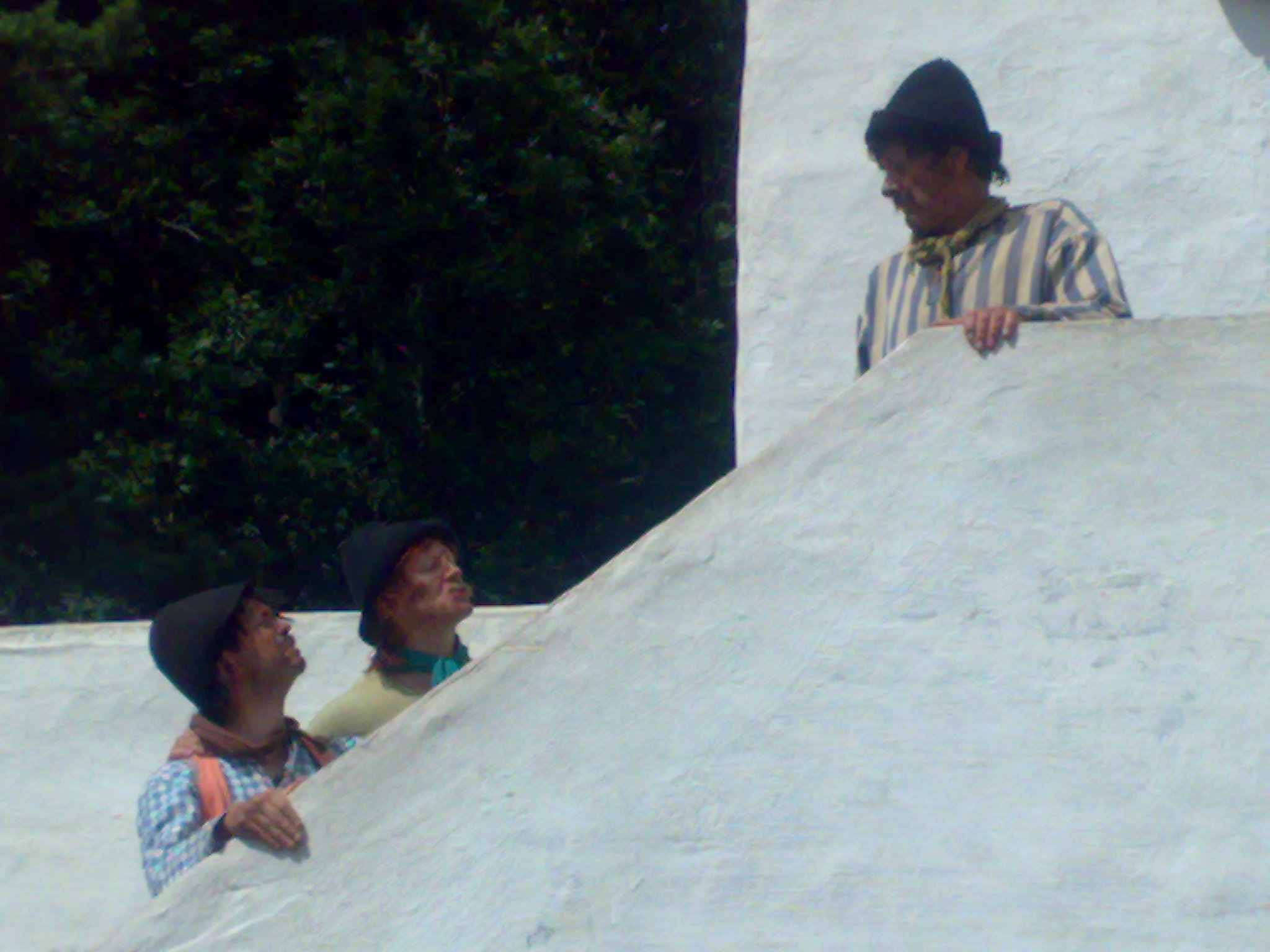
The Robbers Kasper, Jesper and Jonathan in the Kardemomme by

== Law ==
Law of Cardamom (Norwegian: Kardemommeloven) is the only law in Cardamom Town. The law is simple and liberal:

You shall never bother others,
you shall be both fair and kind,
and whatever else you do I shall not mind.

== Songs ==
- Politimester Bastians vise (Constable Bastian's song)
- Visen om været (Song about the weather)
- Trikken i Kardemomme (The tram in Cardemom Town)
- Røvervise (The robbers' song)
- Lille Kamomilla spiller (Little Kamomilla playing)
- Kardemommesangen (The Cardamom song)
- Den talende kamel (The talking camel)
- Tante Sofies sinte vise (Aunt Sophie's angry song)
- Røverfangevise (The capturing of the robber's song)
- Røvernes letevise (The robbers' exploration song)
- Røvernes vise om Tante Sofie (The robber's song about Aunt Sophie)
- Sofies sinte vise i røverhuset (Sophie's angry song in the robber's house)
- Røvernes vaskevise (The robbers' cleaning song)
- Glade røvere (The happy robbers)
- Hestedans (The horse dance)
- Papegøyen fra Amerika (The parrot from America)
- Hurrasang for Tobias (Hooray song for Tobias)
- Fru Bastians vise (Mrs. Bastian's song)
- Røvernes vaskevise i fengslet (The robbers' cleaning song in prison)
- Barbermestervise (The barber song)
- Hurrasang for røverne (Hooray song for the robbers)

Some of the songs from the book/play were issued on the EP album Kardemommeviser in 1955. The 1975 album Folk og røvere i Kardemomme by (with Egner playing the Jonathan character) was awarded the Spellemann award.

== Film adaptation ==
The book was made into a film in 1988, directed by Bente Erichsen.

== Publication history ==
- First introduced in radio programs for children (Barnetimen for de minste) in 1955
- 1955, Norway, ? (ISBN NA), pub date ? ? 1955, hardback (first edition)
- 1956, play version
- 1976, US, Anchorage Press (ISBN 0876021720), pub date ? December 1976, paperback (first US English ed.) (as People and Robbers of Cardemon Town - translators L. Berg & E. Ramsden)
- 1993, Norway, J W Cappelens Forlag AS (ISBN 978-8202139773), pub date ? ? 1993, paperback (as When the Robbers came to Cardamom Town - translator Anthony Barnett) (in English)
