= Alf Rolfsen =

Norwegian painter (1895–1979)

Alf Rolfsen (28 January 1895 – 10 November 1979) was a Norwegian painter and muralist.

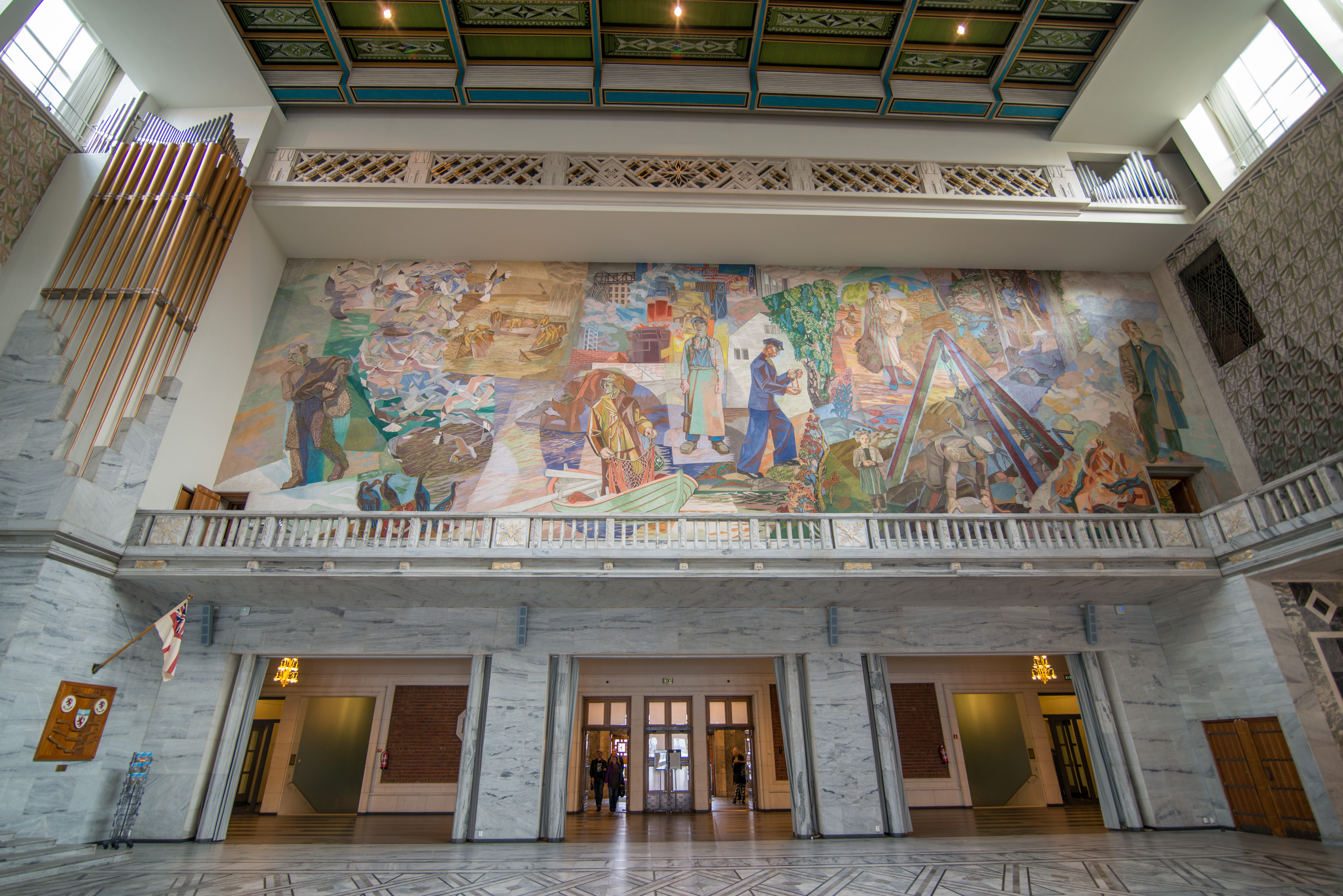
Oslo City Hall, site of the Nobel Peace Prize ceremonies

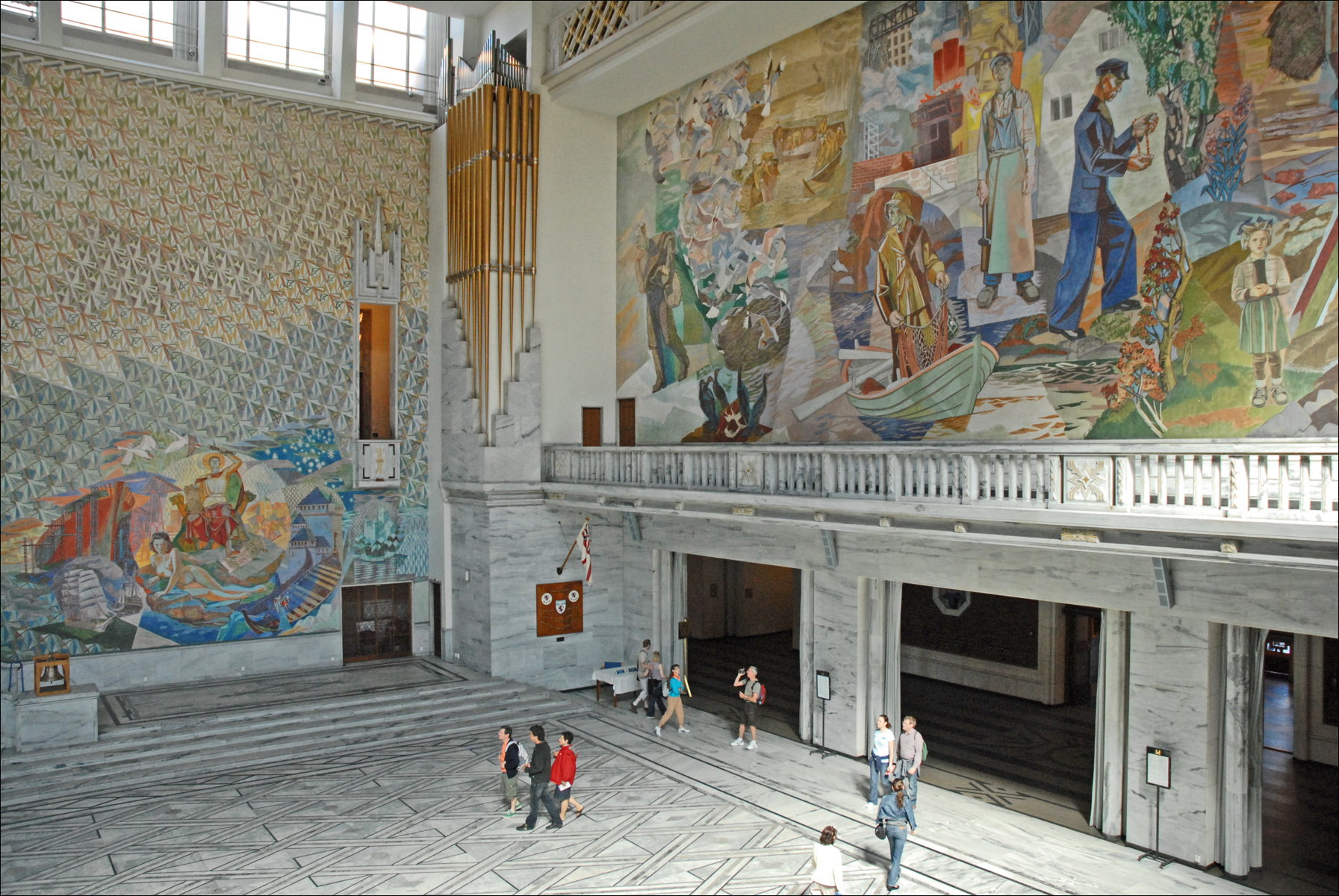
Fresco decorations in the Central Hall at Oslo City Hall

== Personal life ==
Rolfsen was born in Kristiania (now Oslo), Norway. He was the son of writer Nordahl Rolfsen (1848–1928) and Hedevig Martha Hastrup Birch (1858–1937). He was married to Ingrid Platou (1893–1980) in 1920. He was a cousin of both poet Nordahl Grieg (1902–1943) and publisher Harald Grieg (1894–1972).

== Career ==
He studied art under Danish artist Peter Rostrup Bøyesen (1882–1952) in Copenhagen from 1913 to 1916. He debuted in Copenhagen in 1916, followed by study in Paris from 1919 to 1920 where he was strongly influenced by André Derain (1880–1954). After returning home, he held his first solo exhibition at Oslo in 1920. Rolfsen followed with a series of study trips to Italy during 1921–22.

In 1922, he was given the task of painting the foundation wall in the exhibition hall at the new Telegraph Building at Kongens gate 21 in Oslo. The building was completed in 1924 based upon designs by architects Arnstein Arneberg (1882–1961) and Magnus Poulsson (1881–1958).

In 1938, Rolfsen was given the task of decorating three of the walls in the Central Hall of the Oslo City Hall (Oslo rådhus), the site at which the annual Nobel Peace Prize ceremonies have been held since 1990. The northern wall is covered by the painting titled Arbeidets Norge fra de drivende garn til skovene i øst. On the eastern wall is the work Okkupasjonshistorien, about 30 metres (98 ft) long, with motifs from the Occupation of Norway by Nazi Germany during World War II. The painting on the western wall is titled St. Hallvard in recognition of Oslo's patron saint, Hallvard Vebjørnsson. The decorations of the City Hall were finished and uncovered in 1950.

Rolfsen is best known for his fresco paintings. His principal works include the decoration of crematorium at Vestre gravlund in Oslo from 1932 to 1937 and the Haugesund City Hall from 1952 to 1954. He also decorated a number of churches including Stiklestad Church in Verdal Municipality from 1929 to 1930 and Ullensaker Church in Akershus county from 1958. He is represented at the National Gallery of Norway in Oslo with several oil paintings including Kilden from 1926, Gruppe from 1931 and Den store stasjon from 1932.

Among Rolfsen's book illustrations are an edition of Asbjørnsen and Moe's fairy tales and later editions of his father's readers. He also wrote books and articles on art and artists.

Rolfsen was decorated Knight of the Swedish Order of the Polar Star in 1937 and Commander of the Royal Norwegian Order of St. Olav in 1955. He received the Prince Eugen Medal in 1951. During 1971, he received both the Arts Council Norway Honorary Award (Norsk kulturråds ærespris) and the St. Hallvard Medal (St. Hallvard-medaljen).

Awards
Preceded by Alf Prøysen	Recipient of the Norsk kulturråds ærespris 1971	Succeeded by Klaus Egge
