= Thorbjørn Egner =

Norwegian artist and writer (1912–1990)

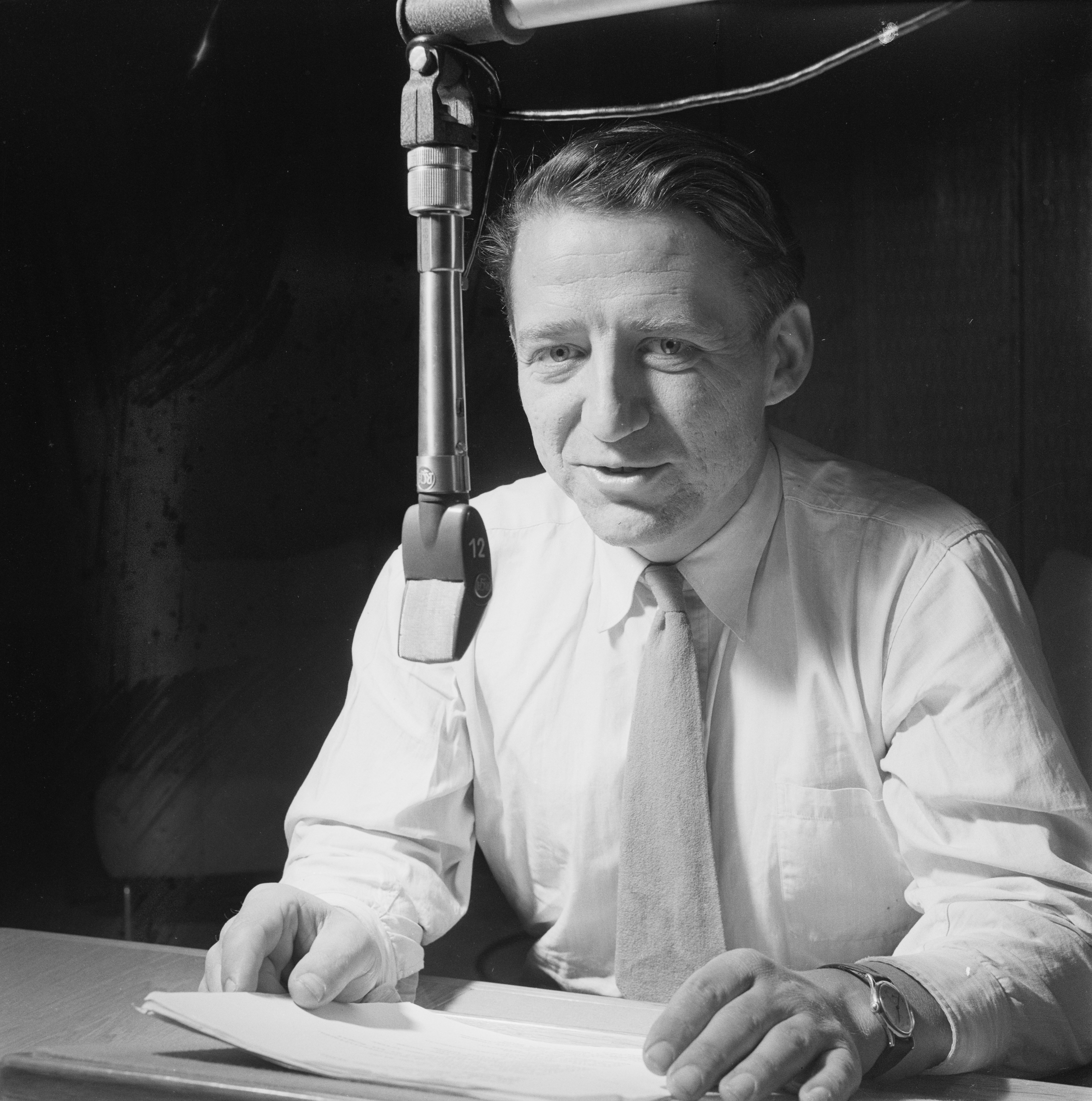
- Thorbjørn Egner c. 1952
- Born: 12 December 1912; Oslo, Norway
- Died: 24 December 1990 (aged 78); Oslo, Norway
- Education: Norwegian National Academy of Craft and Art Industry
- Occupations: Artist, author, songwriter, playwright, musician, illustrator and translator
- Writing career
- Genres: Children's literature, play, novels, songs, drawing

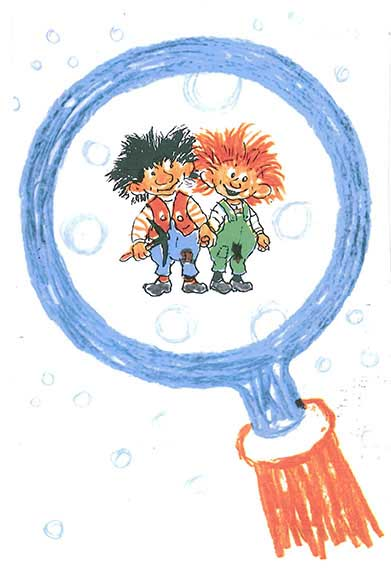
Karius and Baktus designed by Thorbjørn Egner

Thorbjørn Egner (12 December 1912 – 24 December 1990) was a Norwegian playwright, songwriter and illustrator known principally for his books, plays and musicals for children. He is principally associated with his narratives for children including Karius og Baktus (1949) and Folk og røvere i Kardemomme by (1955).

== Biography ==
He grew up in the working-class neighbourhood Kampen in Oslo, Norway. His parents were Magnus Egner (1872–1952) and Anna Hansen (1874–1957). He was trained as an artist at the Norwegian National Academy of Craft and Art Industry under Eivind Nielsen and Per Krohg 1933–34.

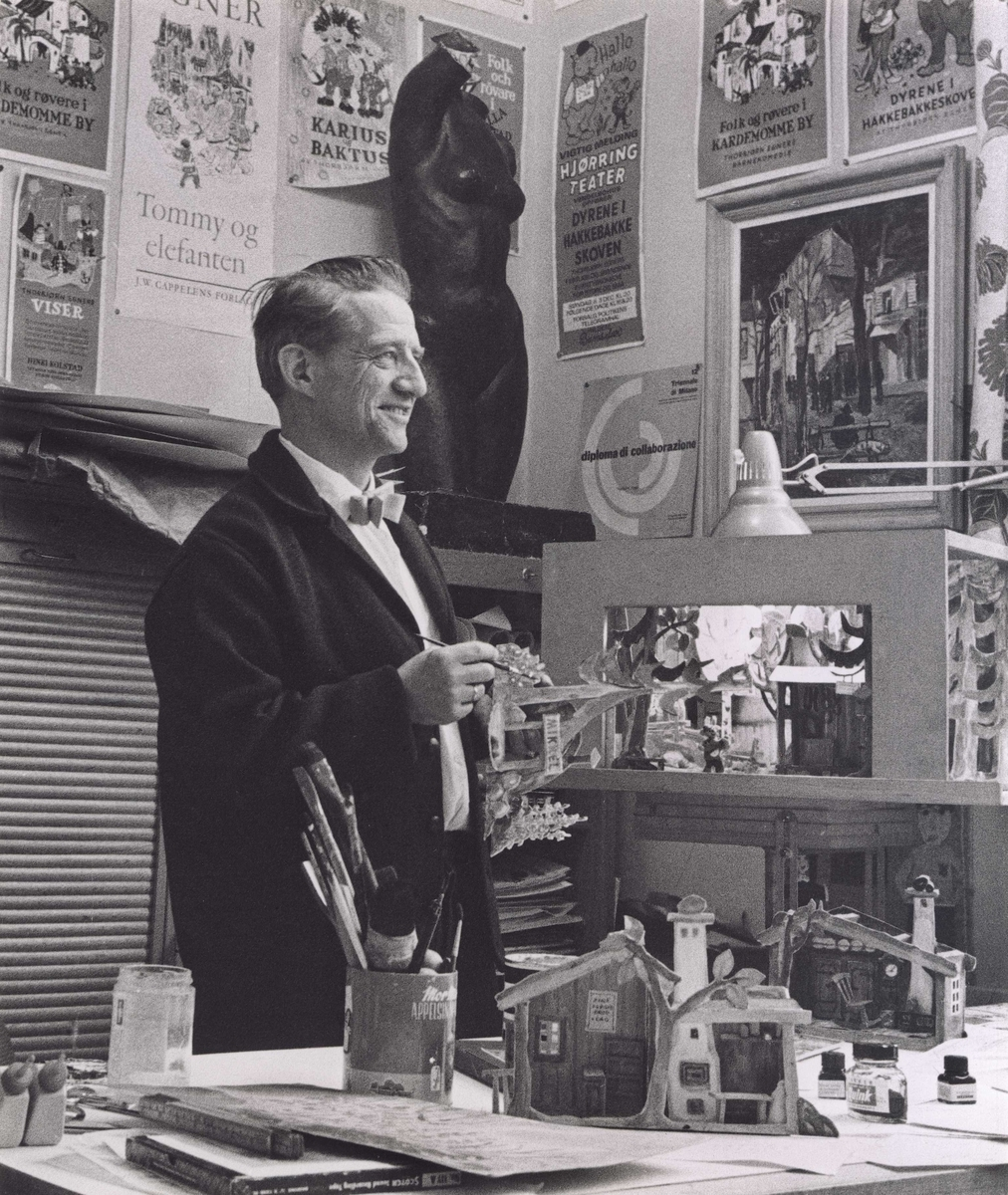
Thorbjørn Egner in the early 1960s

He started his career in advertising. Over a seven year period, he was employed as a designer and decorator at the advertising firm Høydahl Ohme A/S. His breakthrough was on the nationally broadcast children's radio show Barnetimen for de minste in the beginning of the 1950s. Egner is particularly known for his books Karius og Baktus (1949), Thorbjørn Egners lesebøker (1950–1972), Klatremus og de andre dyrene i Hakkebakkeskogen (1953) and Folk og røvere i Kardemomme by (1955, translated in 1976). The latter two were made into successful musicals. He also illustrated his own books.

Thorbjørn Egner received the Royal Norwegian Order of St. Olav in 1972 and Cappelenprisen in 1979. He also awarded the Spellemannprisen in 1975 for Ole Brumm og vennene hans, in 1977 for the album Folk og røvere i Kardemomme by and in 1982 for Beste Egnerviser, a collection of his songs.

== Personal life ==
In 1937, Thorbjørn Egner married Annie Eliassen (born in 1912 in Oslo). They had four children together. Egner died in the afternoon of Christmas Eve 1990 of a heart attack. He was buried at Ullern Church (Ullern kirkegård) in Oslo. He is the great-grandfather of ski jumper Halvor Egner Granerud.

== Selected publications ==
=== Books ===
- Gamle hus i Vågå (1943)
- Gamle hus i Rauland (1945)

=== Children's books ===
- Barneboka (1940, with Sigurd Winsnes)
- Malermester Klattiklatt dypper kosten - og tar fatt (1940)
- Truls og Kari: en liten bok for store og små (1941)
- Truls og Kari kommer til den store byen (1942)
- Ola-Ola som alle dyra var så glad i (1942)
- Småfolk (1942)
- Jumbo som dro ut i verden (1943)
- Klattiklatt i hjemmefronten (1945)
- Hesten, kua og de andre (1945)
- Da Per var ku (1946)
- Karius og Baktus (1949)
- Tretten viser fra barnetimen (songbook, 1951)
- Nye viser fra barnetimen (songbook, 1952)
- Klatremus og de andre dyrene i Hakkebakkeskogen (1953)
- Folk og røvere i Kardemomme by (1955)
- Tommy og elefanten (1958)
- 4 Verden er stor (1972)

=== Albums ===
- Kardemommeviser (1955)
- Doktor Dyregod (1955)
- Karius og Baktus (1957)
- Ole Brumm (Winnie the Pooh) og vennene hans (stories 1-4, 1974; stories 5-8, 1975; stories 9-11, 1976)
- Folk og røvere i Kardemomme by (1975)
- De seksten beste Egnerviser (issued 1982; recorded 1953–1982)
- Hakkebakkeskogen (2012)

=== Films ===
- Karius og Baktus (1955, puppet film, directed by Ivo Caprino)
- Klatremus i knipe (1955, puppet film, directed by Ivo Caprino)
- Folk og røvere i Kardemomme by (1988, directed by Bente Erichsen)
- Dyrene i Hakkebakkeskogen (2016, puppet film, directed by Rasmus A. Sivertsen)

== Other sources ==
- Christopher Hals Gylseth (2000) Thorbjørn Egner. Tigergutt kan alt! (Schibsted) ISBN 82-516-1790-1
- Erle M. Stokke, Astrid Hagen Krog (1999) Thorbjørn Egner, Forfatterskapslesning i skolen (Biblioteksentralen) ISBN 9788270222407

Awards
Preceded by first recipient	Recipient of the Cappelen Prize; 1979	Succeeded by Odd Eidem
