= Hallvard Vebjørnsson =

Norwegian Christian saint (c. 1020–1043)

Saint Hallvard Hallvard Vebjørnsson
- Saint Hallvard is depicted in the seal of the city of Oslo, holding the millstone and arrows used to kill him, with the woman he defended at his feet

Martyr
- Born: c. 1020; Lier, Buskerud, Norway
- Died: 1043 (aged 22–23)
- Venerated in: Catholic Church; Eastern Orthodoxy; Oriental Orthodoxy
- Feast: 15 May
- Patronage: Oslo, innocence

Hallvard Vebjørnsson (Hallvard Den Hellige) (c. 1020–1043), commonly referred to as Saint Hallvard (Sankt Hallvard), is the patron saint of Oslo. He is considered a martyr because of his defence of an innocent thrall woman. His religious feast day is 15 May.

The connection of St. Hallvard to the city of Oslo was evidenced by the fact that his image was recorded in the city's seal since the Middle Ages. The municipality's highest honor, the St. Hallvard Medal (St. Hallvard-medaljen), was named after him in 1950.

== Background ==
Little is known of his life, and all traditional stories relate to his death near Drammen. Although the exact year of birth and place of his birth are unknown, he is commonly believed to have been born c. 1020. According to tradition, his father was the farmer Vebjørn. His parents were wealthy farmers and owned the Huseby farm in Lier. His mother, Torny Gudbrandsdatter, was reportedly related to St. Olaf, the patron saint of Norway. It is said that she was the daughter of Gudbrand Kula from Oppland, who was also the father of Åsta Gudbrandsdatter, St. Olaf's mother.

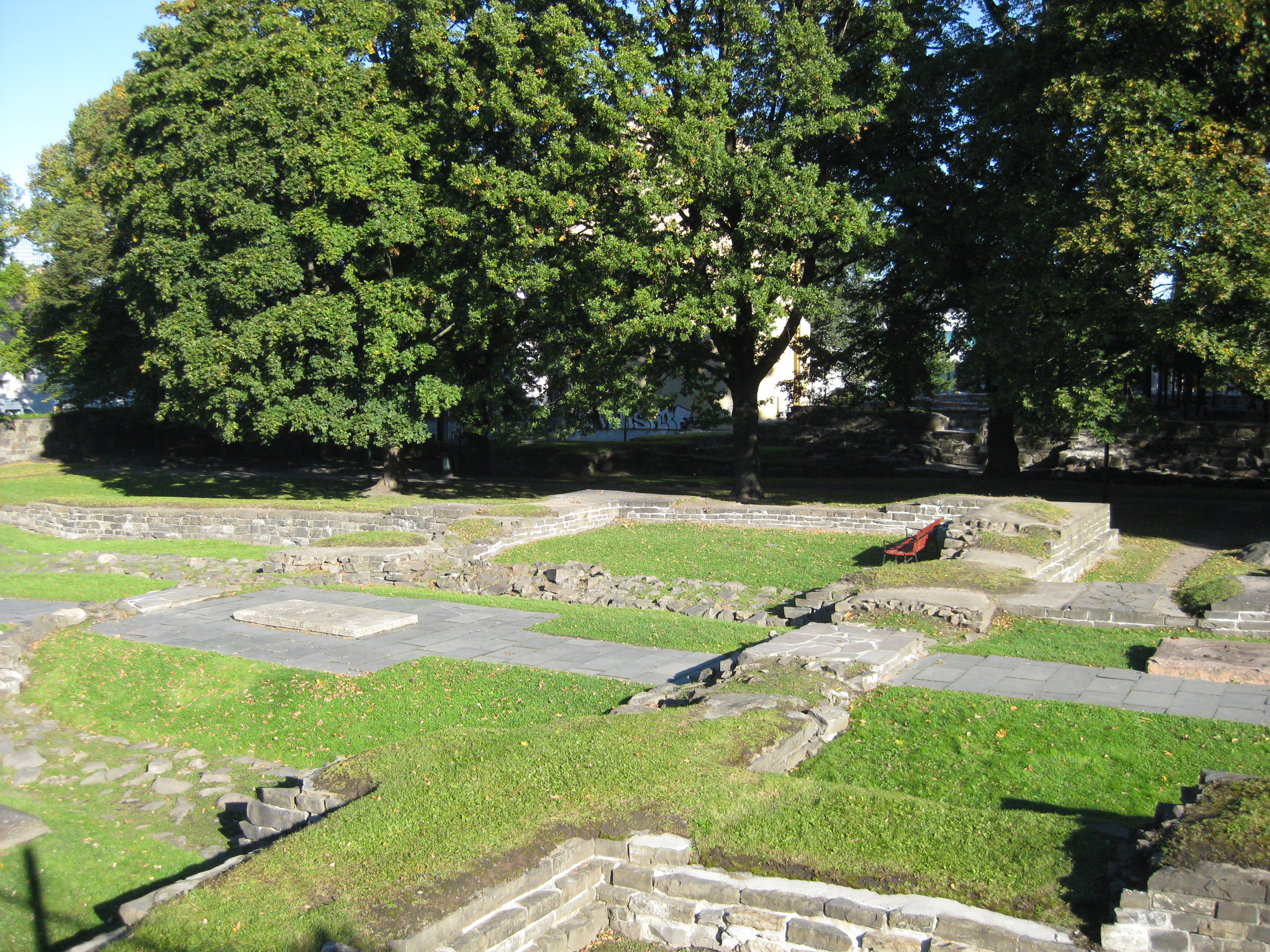
Ruins of St. Hallvard's Cathedral in Oslo

St Hallvard. Nidaros Cathedral

== Death ==
Hallvard defended a pregnant woman, most likely a thrall, who had been given sanctuary from three men accusing her of theft. Hallvard believed in her innocence and took her on his boat. Hallvard, together with the woman, were killed by arrows from the men. The woman was buried on the beach. Hallvard, however, was bound with a millstone around his neck, and the men attempted to sink his body in Drammensfjord but it refused to remain submerged, and as a result their crimes were discovered. A local village buried him in a Christian manner and people came to regard him as a martyr to their faith.

== Veneration ==
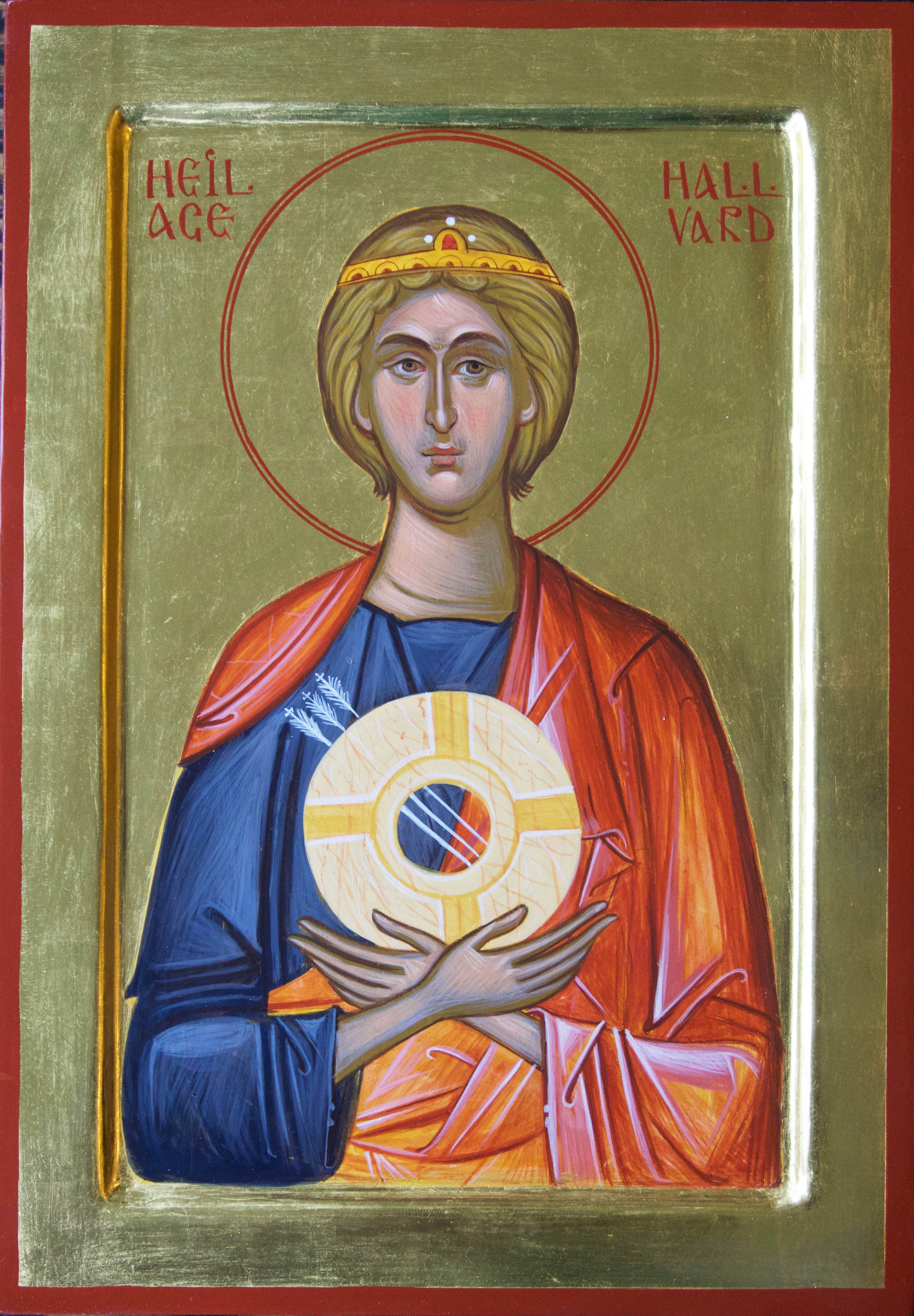
Saint Hallvard

St. Hallvard's Cathedral (Hallvardskatedralen) in Oslo was dedicated to his name and his remains were relocated to the facility which was finished in 1130.

The cathedral was built on the hill just north of the area that is now the Old Town market square in Oslo (intersection of Bispegata –Oslo gate). For almost 500 years this was the most important church in the city. Besides being the bishop's seat and religious center, the cathedral was the coronation church, the royal wedding church and the royal burial chapel. The facility was in use as a church until about 1655. It fell into disrepair in the 17th century and is today a ruin situated in Minneparken.

15 May is celebrated as St. Hallvard's Day. This is also known as Oslo Day.

St. Hallvard is depicted both inside and outside Oslo City Hall, represented by Nic Schiøll's sculpture on the front of the building, and a tapestry designed by Else Poulsson, woven by Else Halling in the Bystyresalen council chamber.
