= St. Clement's Church, Oslo =

Ruined parish in Norway

Coordinates: 59°54′15.30″N 10°45′56.30″E

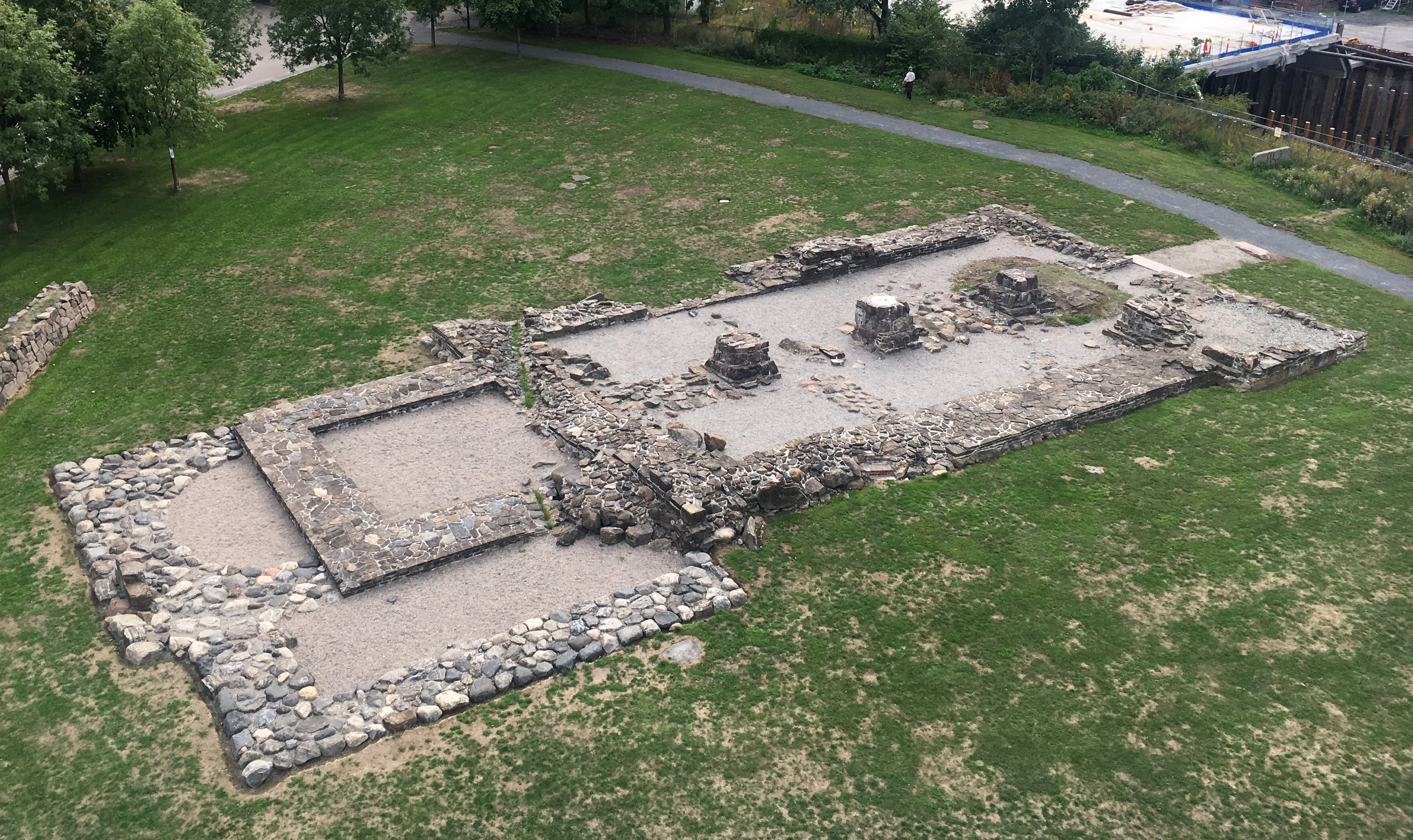
Foundation of St. Clement's Church

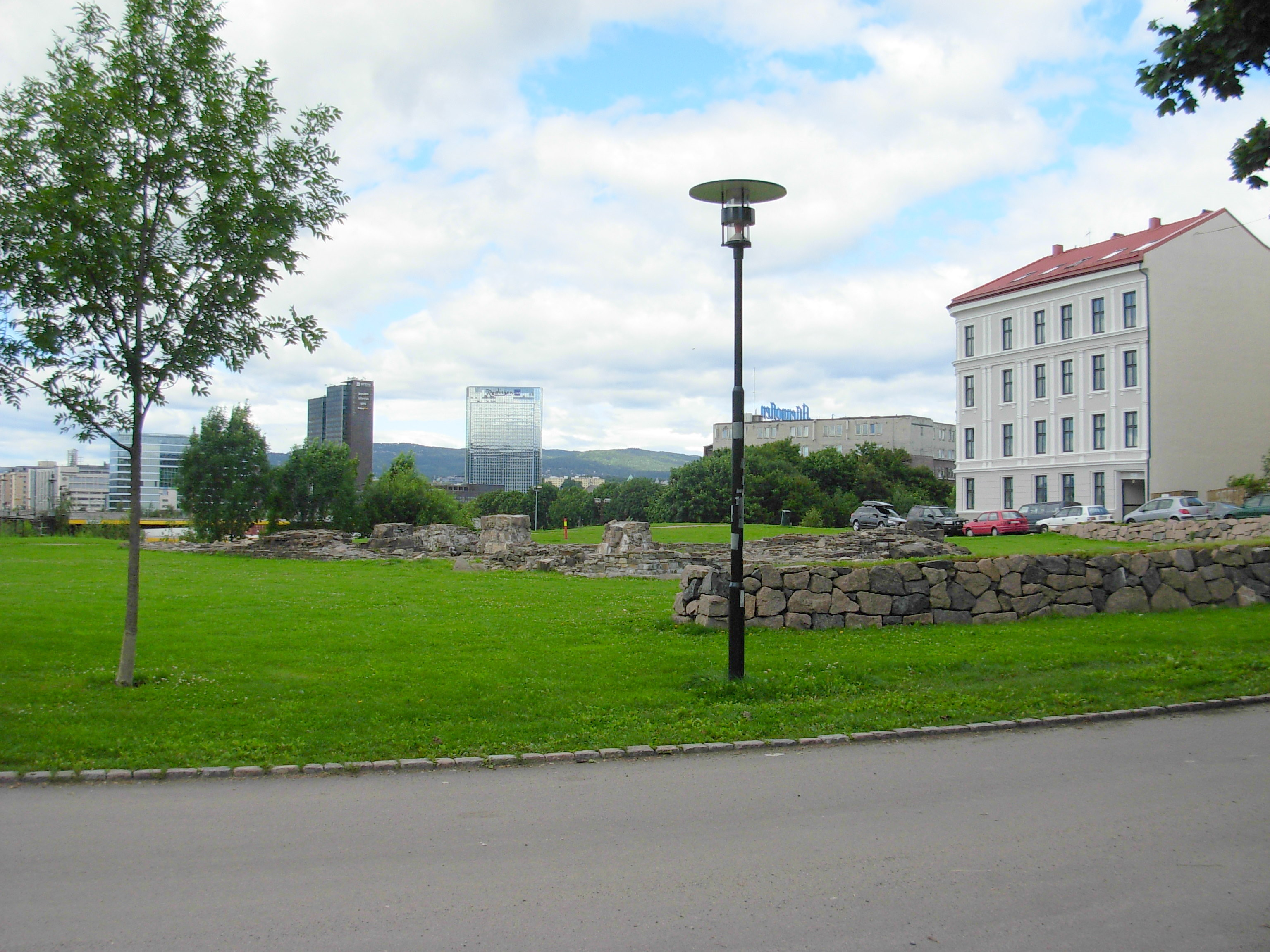
Ruins of St. Clement's Church at Middelalderparken in Oslo

St. Clement's Church (Clemenskirken i Oslo) was one of the Roman Catholic parish churches of Oslo, Norway. Ruins of St. Clement's Church are now exposed and included as part of Middelalderparken in the inner city of Oslo (Gamlebyen). It was located between the former Klemetsallmenningen and Østre strede. It is south of the ruins of Oslo Kongsgård estate and St. Hallvard's Cathedral.

== History ==
The church was consecrated to St. Clement, who was one of the 1st-century popes. He was martyred by being drowned with an anchor tied around his neck and thus became the patron saint of, among other things, seafarers.

It was a stone church with a tower, and was one of the very few churches known to have a double-nave floor plan. There were entrances to the south and west. Along the middle axis of the choir there were three pillars which stood in a row along the middle of the church and supported the roof. Excavations revealed that it was originally built with two pillars, but that further construction increased this to three. The church went out of use after the Protestant Reformation and was probably demolished by 1540.

The ruins were first exposed and examined through excavation by architect Gerhard Fischer in 1921, then remained unnoticed for years under Loengbrua. In 1970–71, archaeologist Ole Egil Eide had the opportunity to dig further into the ground under the church, and found traces of burials, 81 in all, all of which were older than the stone church. Seven layers of burials were found under the stone church. Beneath the sand layer, Eide found an additional 60 graves. His interpretation is that there have been at least two churches, presumably stave churches, on the spot where the stone church was built around 1100. The oldest of the graves were radiological dated to about 980–1030, and were some of the oldest Christian burials found in Norway.
