= Minneparken =

Park in Gamle Oslo, Norway

Coordinates: 59°54′21.812″N 10°46′7.1796″E

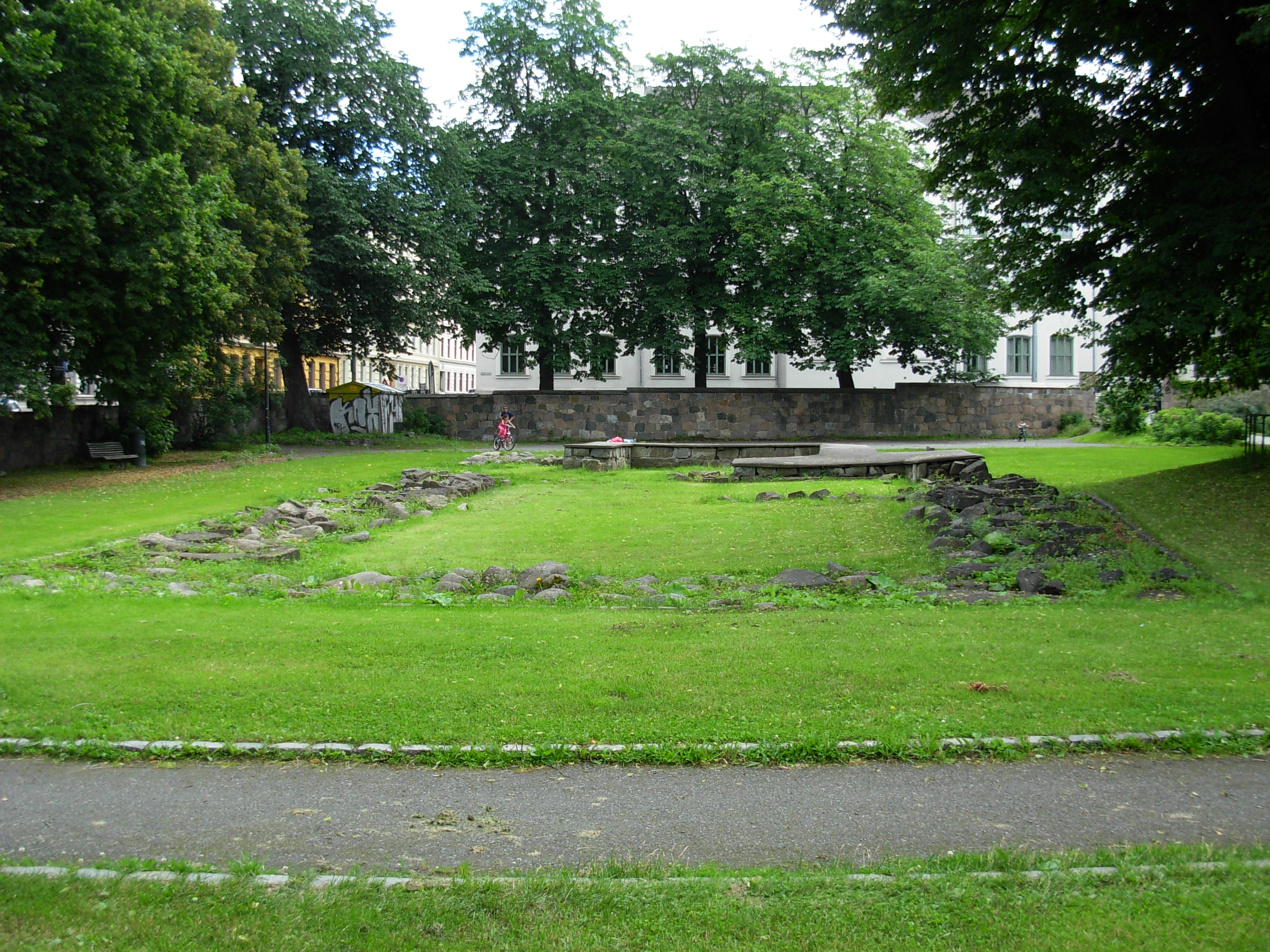
Holy Cross Church ruins

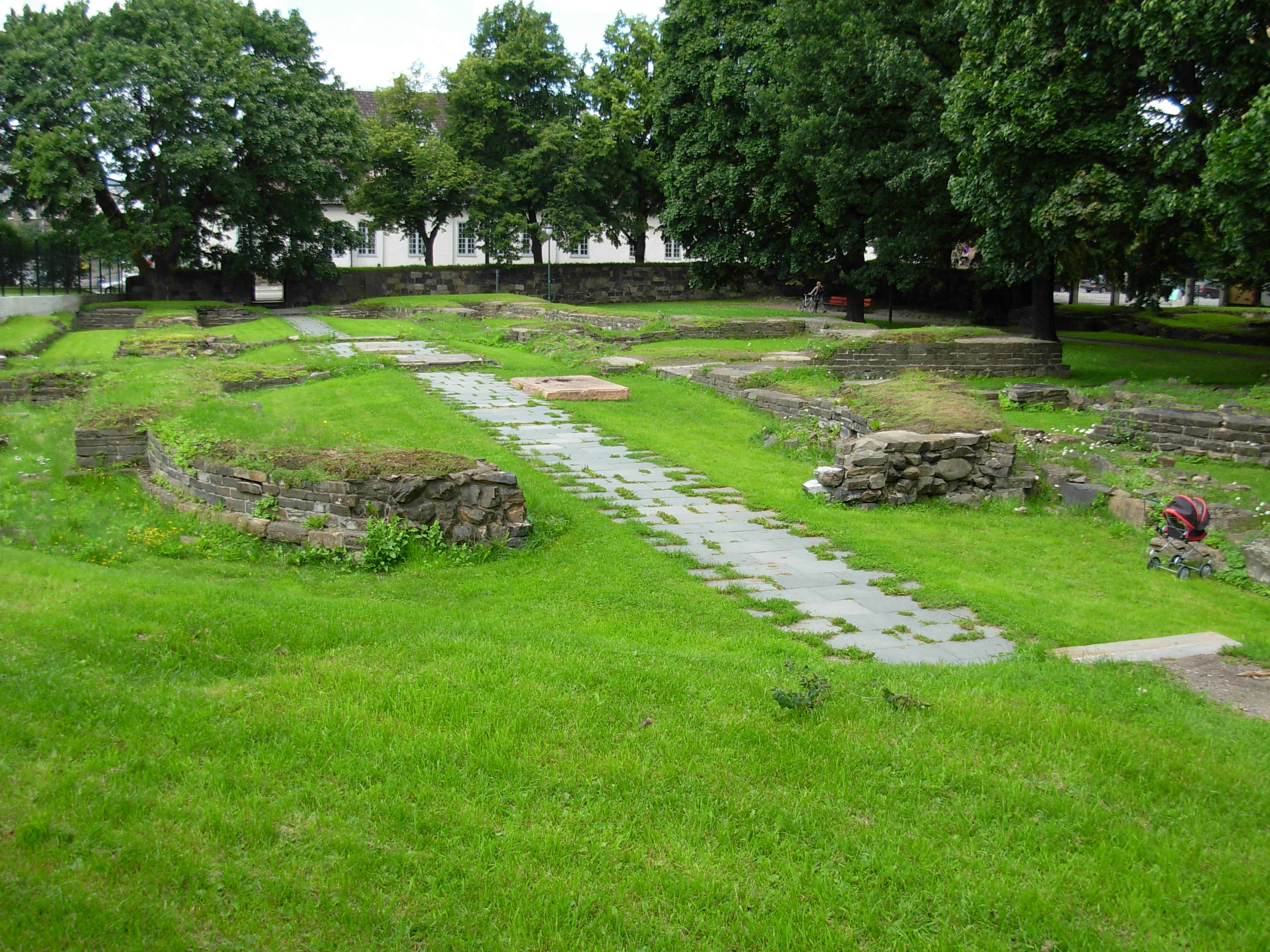
St. Hallvard's Cathedral ruins

Minneparken is situated in Gamle Oslo adjacent to Oslo torg at Gamlebyen in Oslo, Norway. The park is bounded by St. Hallvards plass and Oslo gate in the west, Bispegata in the south, St. Halvards gate in the southeast, Egedes gate in the east and Arups gate in the north.

The 3.4 hectare park contains the excavated ruins of several buildings dating from the Middle Ages. Archaeologist Gerhard Fischer (1890–1977), who led an excavation in the 1920s, made a proposal for a memorial park which was approved by the municipality in 1928.

== Ruins ==
- St. Hallvard's Cathedral (Hallvardskatedralen) was a Romanesque basilica with central tower and transept which was built in the early 12th century. The church was in use until 1660, and the last remnants of the building were demolished around 1780. Excavations began in 1865, and work continued in 1879.
- St. Olav's Monastery (Olavsklosteret) was established at the end of the 12th century by the Dominican order. The monastery probably burned in 1536. Excavation was conducted by Gerhard Fischer in the period 1914-26.
- Holy Cross Church (Korskirken) was small Romanesque stone church. The church floor plan may indicate the 12th century as the time of construction. The church was demolished after the Reformation. Ruins of the church were excavated in 1922.

== See also ==
- Middelalderparken
