= Old Oslo =

Old Oslo can refer to:

- Old Town, Oslo (in Norwegian : Gamlebyen, Oslo), a neighborhood in Oslo, Norway, where the first settlement of town was located
- Gamle Oslo (in English: Old Oslo), a borough of the city of Oslo, Norway.
