= Gamlebyen Church =

- Gamlebyen kirke
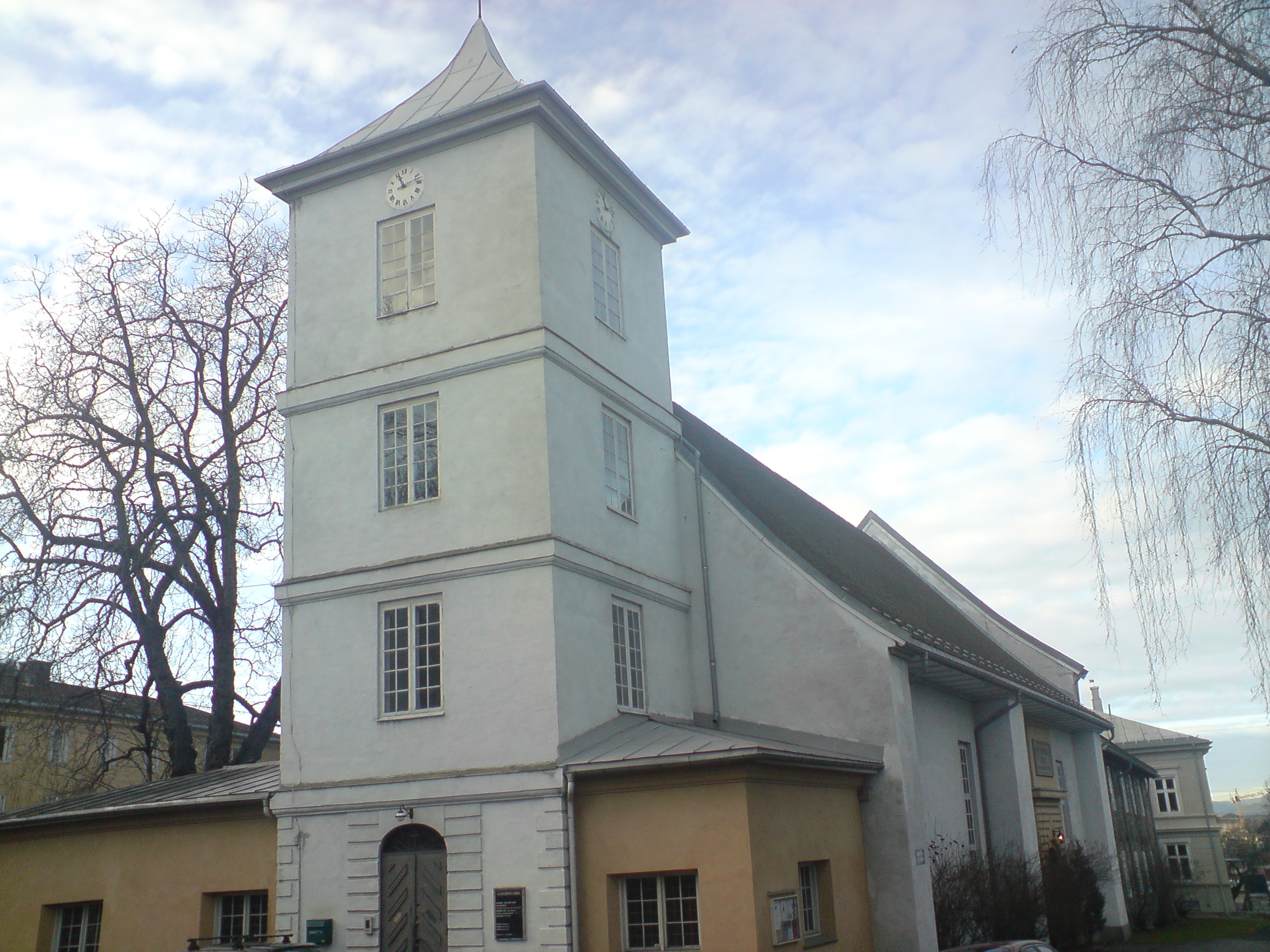

- Location within Oslo Location within Norway
- 59°54′11.07″N 10°46′3.94″E
- Location: Ekebergveien 1, Old Town, Oslo,
- Country: Norway
- Denomination: Owned by: Oslo University Hospital; Leased by Church of Norway
- Churchmanship: Evangelical Lutheran
- Website: https://kirken.no/gamlebyenoggronland

History
- Former name(s): Oslo Church; Oslo Hospital's Church
- Founded: 1290
- Consecrated: 1939

Architecture
- Completed: 1796

Specifications
- Materials: Brick and stone

Administration
- Diocese: Diocese of Oslo
- Parish: Gamlebyen og Grønland Parish 01.01.2013

Gamlebyen Church is a private church, belonging to Oslo University Hospital and is also called Oslo Hospital's Church, located in the old town of Oslo, Norway. It is leased to the Diocese of Oslo of the Church of Norway and serves as the parish church for the Gamlebyen parish in Oslo. Up to 1925 it had the name Oslo Church, but when the city changed its name from Kristiania to Oslo, the church got the present name. The present church building is listed in 1796 partly on the foundations of the Franciscan monastery church built around 1290. The church is located at the foot of the north-facing slope Ekeberg, across the street from the Gamlebyen Cemetery. The chapel at the cemetery is abandoned as a burial chapel and leased to the Ethiopian community in Oslo. At funerals, the church itself is now used instead.

== History ==
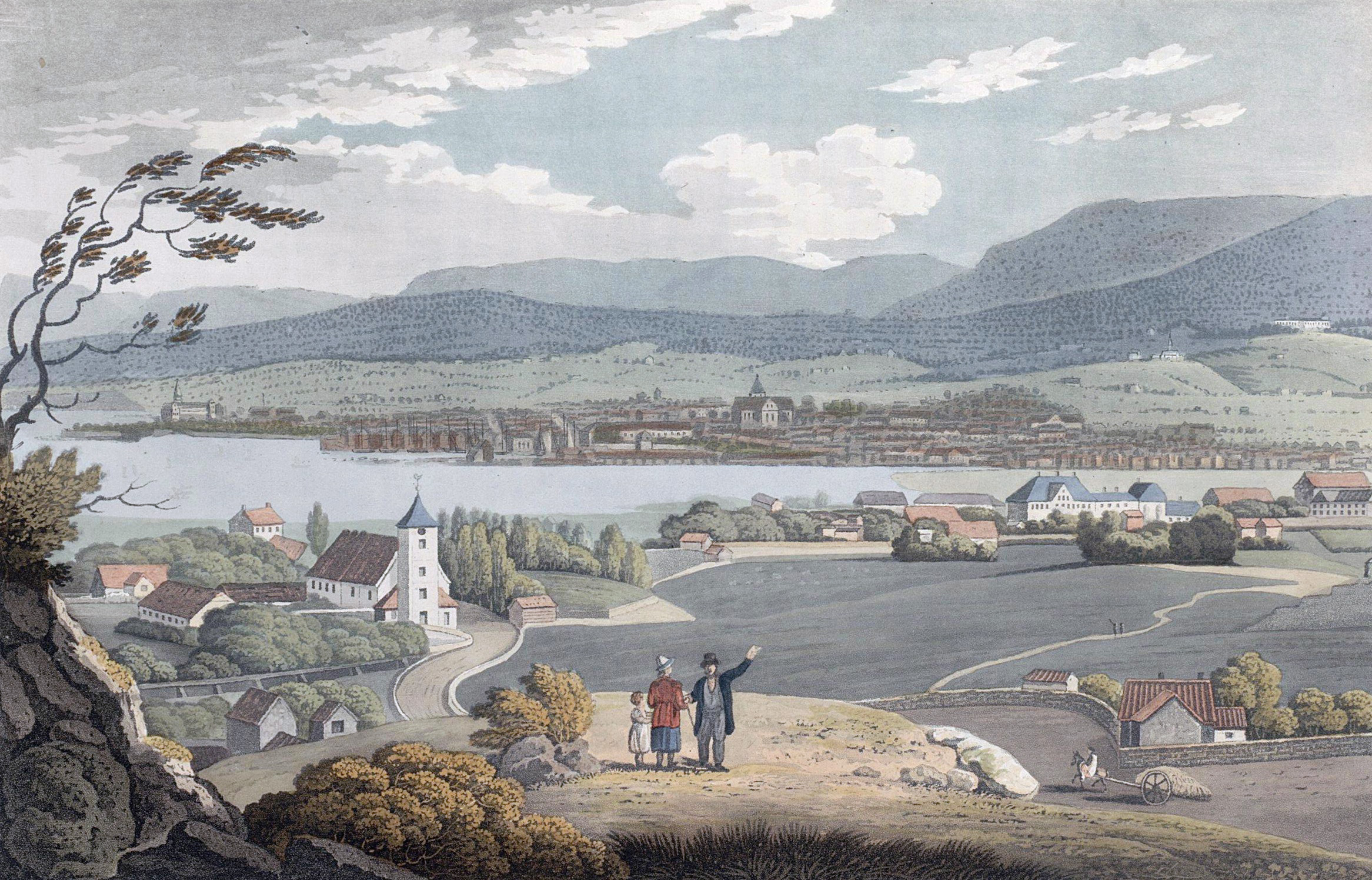
View of Christiania (Oslo) 1800, with the Old Town and Gamlebyen Church nearest, from Boydell's picturesque scenery of Norway by John William Edy

The abbey Church which was built towards the end of the 1200s, was one of Oslo's earliest buildings constructed of brick which came from Duke Hakon's brickworks on the banks of the Alna River.

After the Protestant Reformation in 1536 the church was converted into a hospital.

In 1567, during the Swedish attack, the first church was destroyed. On the ruins of the abbey, the building was divided into several floors and served thereafter as a hospital building with a church on the first floor. The house now known as the "stone building" was added later. This is regarded today as the oldest hospital building. During the 1700s there were also several buildings, including "Dollhuset" for psychiatric patients.

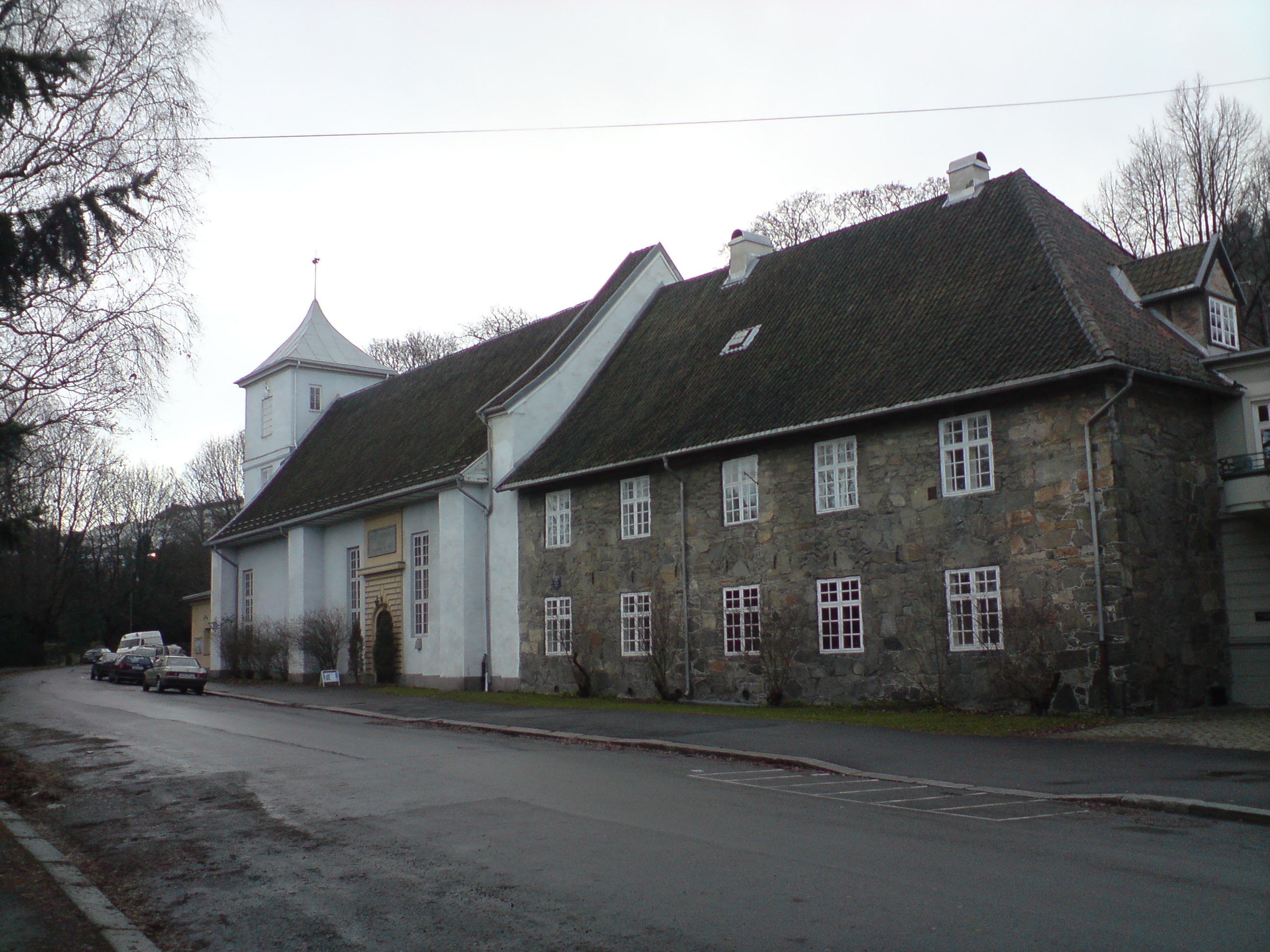
Gamlebyen Church and the "stone building" from 1737 as seen from the south

In 1734, a new church was built on the foundations of the nave. After the last fire on 13 January 1794 the church was rebuilt in Louis XVI style two years later, again in brick. The old medieval choir was demolished and replaced with a tower that stands there today. The newly built church was opened on 11 May 1796. In the 1800s the church was rebuilt several times. In the period 1934–1939, it was renovated by architect William K. Essendrop, reestablishing its earlier appearance. The flat murtaket was replaced with an arched vault, and a new sacristy was built. The church was reopened on Christmas Eve 1939, in the presence of King Haakon VII.

== Today's church ==
The church has seating for just 200 people. It is one of the oldest churches in Oslo that is still in use. The main building is from 1796. The Stone Building is from 1737. In 1880, seating was added and changes were made to the altar and pulpit. From 1934 to 1939, extensive restoration reestablished the look of 1796. The pulpit from 1880 hangs above the altar but is not in use.
