= Oslo Kongsgård estate =

Former royal residence in Oslo, Norway

Oslo Kongsgård
- Kongsgården i Oslo
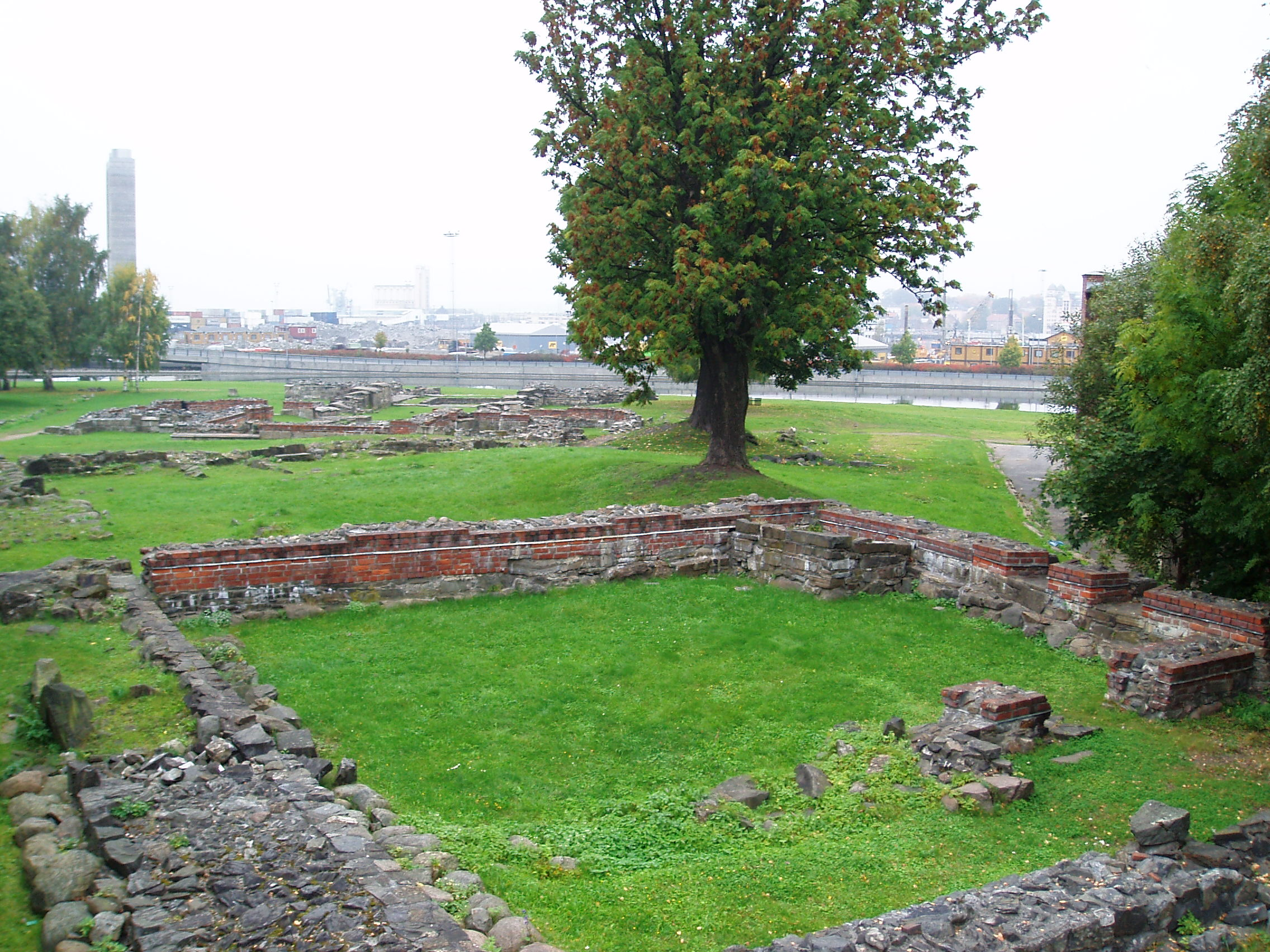
- Ruins of the former royal estate in Oslo

- Location within Oslo Oslo Kongsgård estate (Norway)

General information
- Location: Oslo, Norway
- Coordinates: 59°54′13″N 10°45′48″E
- Construction started: 13th century

The Oslo Kongsgård estate (Norwegian: Oslo kongsgård) was a royal residence and fortified Kongsgård estate located in the Oslo, Norway. The ruins of the former estate and its buildings can today been seen in Middelalderparken in Old Town of Oslo.

== History ==
The oldest parts of the estate that have been excavated are barricade walls built in a classic motte-and-bailey style. These walls likely date from the years between 1040 and 1060, a time when Norway was ruled by King Harald Hardrada. The estate was located close to St Mary's Church and later expanded during the reign of King Haakon Haakonsson, who built larger and stronger walls, transforming the estate into a castle-like structure.

The estate eventually became a royal residential palace with towers, a Haakon's hall-inspired great hall and the largest medieval log houses recorded in Norway. The location of the estate played a significant role when King Haakon V decided to gradually move the capital of Norway from Bergen to Oslo. The estate eventually lost its status and role as a regional administrative center to Akershus Fortress and became the residence of the Chancellor of Norway in the late Middle Ages.
