= Holy Cross Church, Oslo =

Ruined church building in Oslo, Norway

Coordinates: 59°54′25″N 10°46′10″E

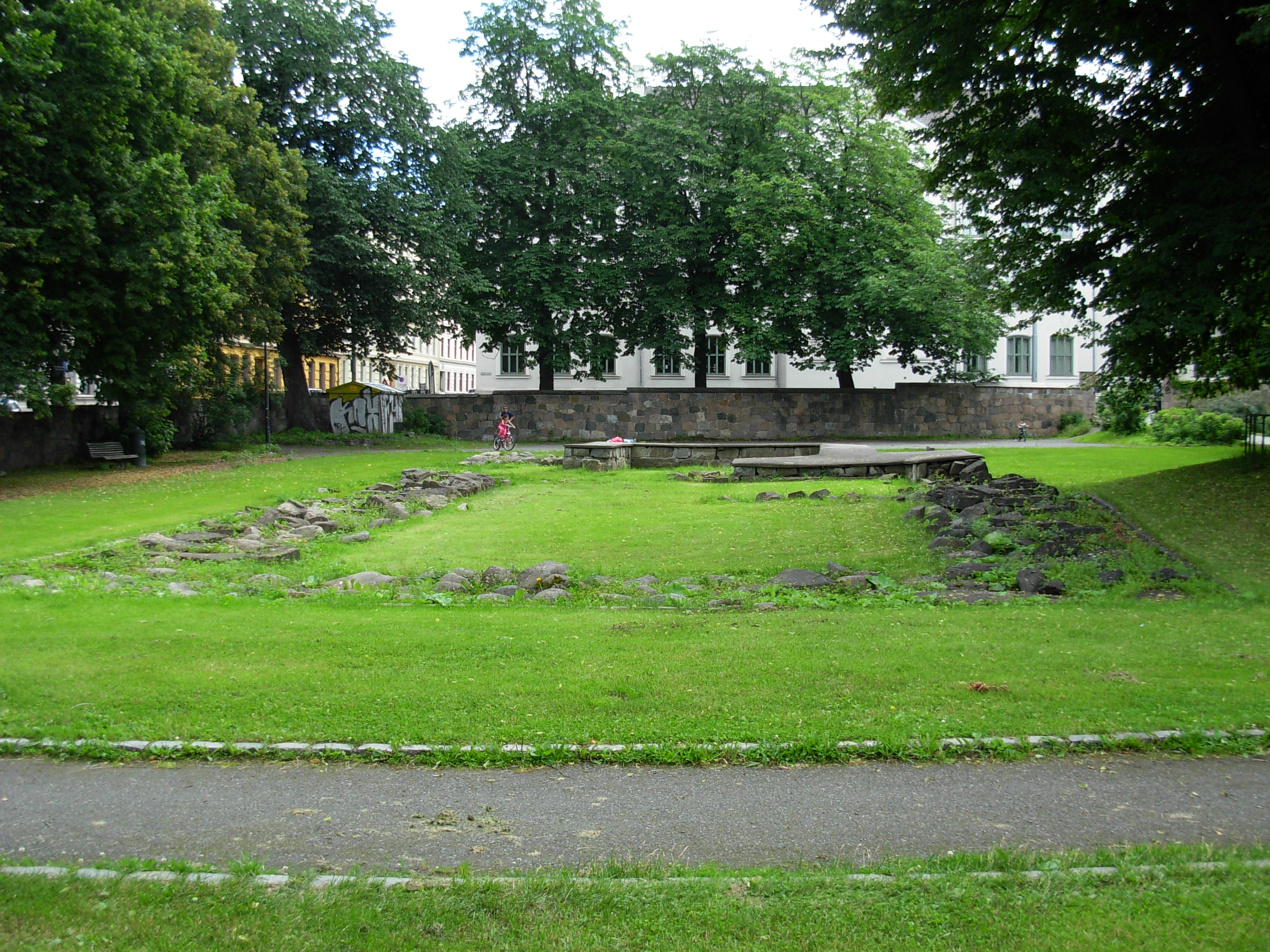
Holy Cross Church, ruin at the Ruin Park, Oslo

The Holy Cross Church (Norwegian: Korskirken) was a small medieval parish church for the northern part of the Old Town of Oslo, Norway. The ruin was rediscovered in 1922 and is now a part of Minneparken containing the ruins of the church and the larger St. Hallvard's Cathedral.

== History ==
There is no definitive information about when the church was built. The church is not mentioned in the accounts of the fighting in Oslo in 1240 between King Haakon IV and Duke Skule, suggesting that the church was built prior to the battle. In 1989, a stick with runic inscriptions, dated to the first half of the 13th century, was found. The name 'Holy Cross Church' occurs in these inscriptions, and it indicates that it may be older than 1240. When the church was built, it was located far north in the city, and an urban development north of the church came in the second half of the 13th century and the 14th century.

The Holy Cross Church had an entrance from the west, from the cemetery, and an entrance directly to the chancel from the south. The remains of the original altar foundation are visible. Around the church sit the remains of the cemetery wall.
