= Middelalderparken =

Park in Oslo, Norway

Coordinates: 59°54′12″N 10°45′44″E

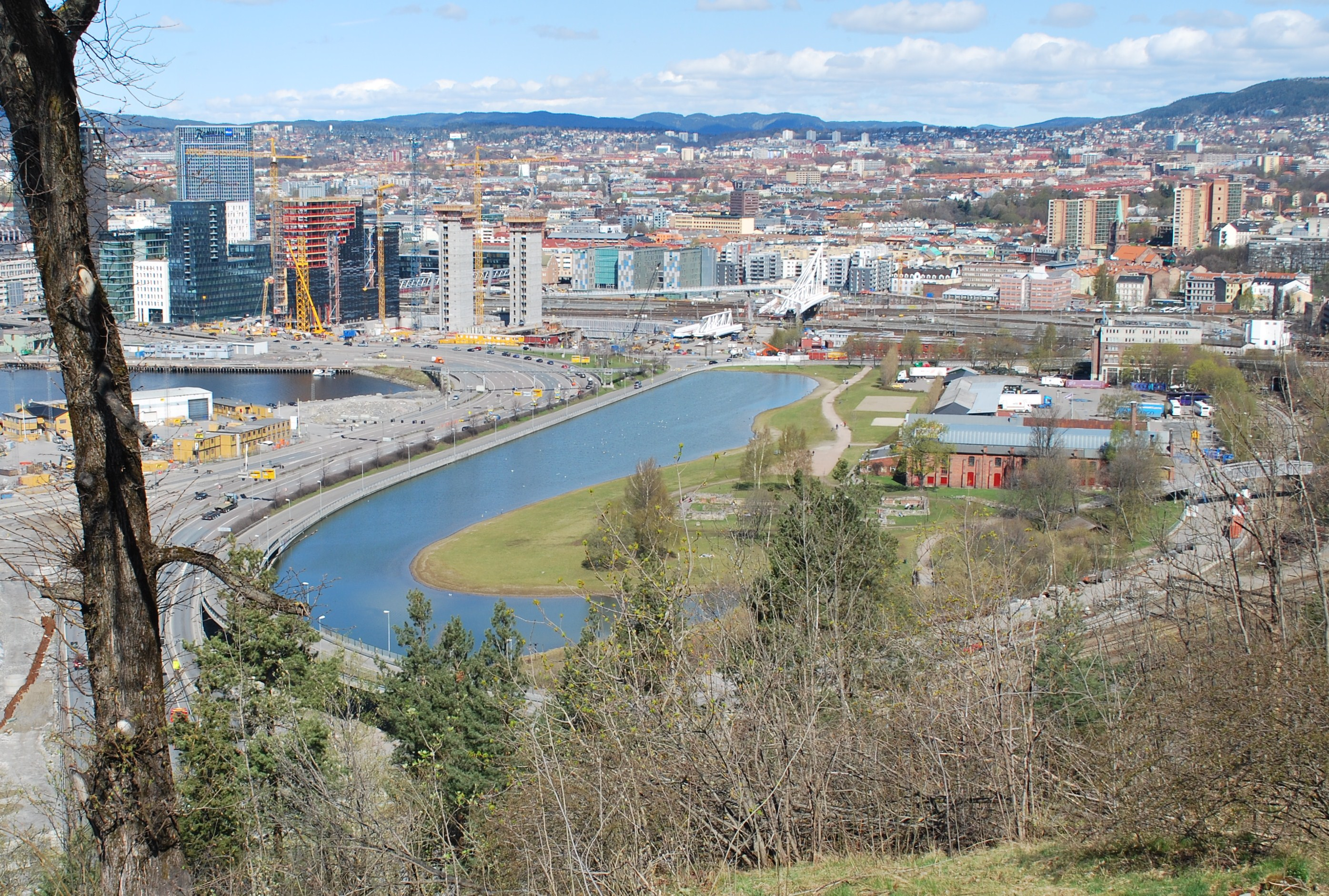
Middelalderparken as seen from Ekeberg

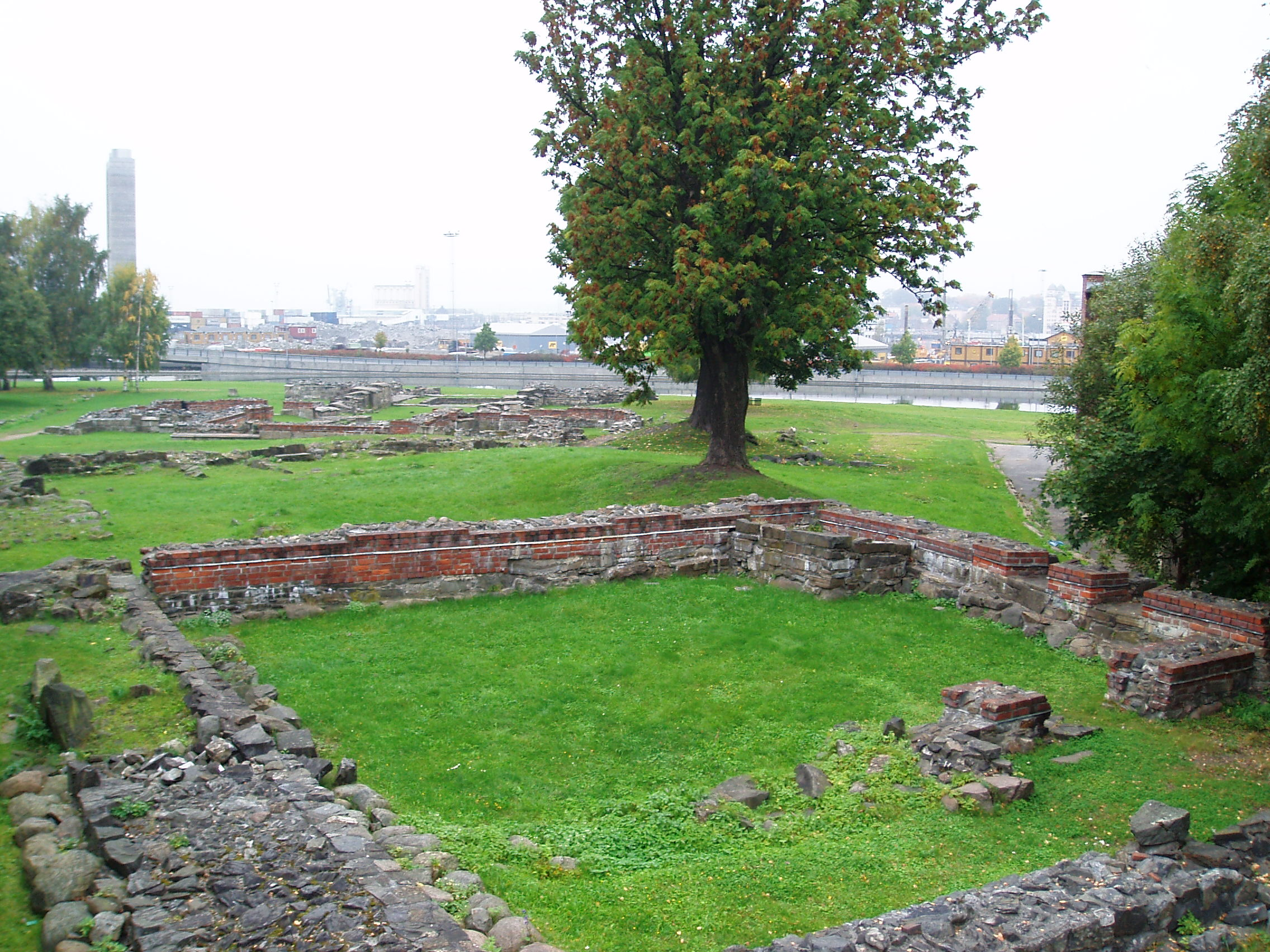
Ruins of the former Royal Estate

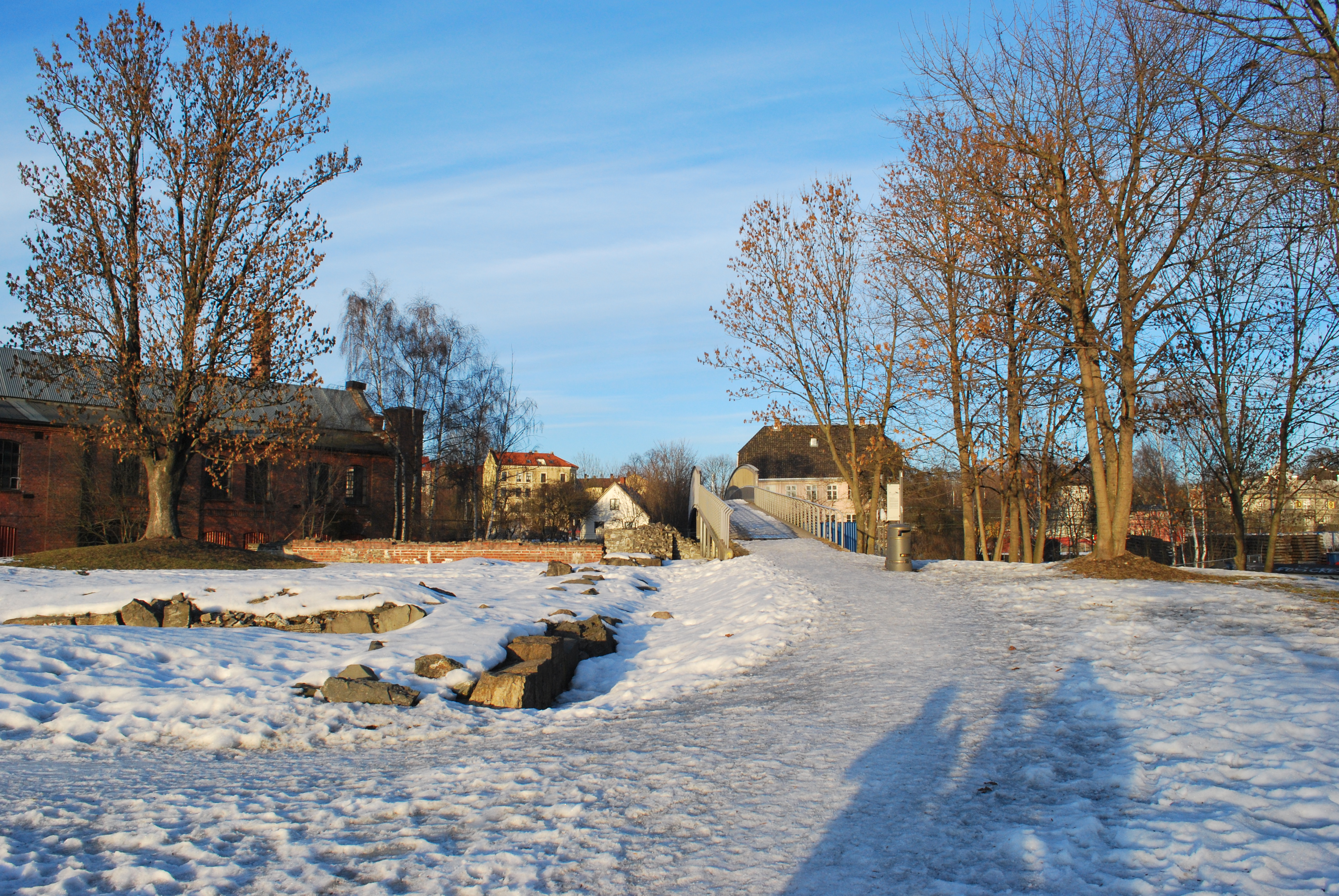
The bridge entrance to Middelalderparken from Saxegaards gate

The Medieval Park (Norwegian: Middelalderparken) is located in the borough of Gamle Oslo in Oslo, Norway. The park was opened in the year 2000 at Sørenga in what was once the southern part of the medieval city of Oslo. The park is located within an area which also included the Minneparken and Ladegården on the north side of Bispegata. Development in the area is prohibited due to ruins and cultural layers above and below ground.

In the park are the ruins of St. Clement's Church, St. Mary's Church and the former royal estate (Oslo Kongsgård). In the west the shoreline meets the park's land area approximately where Oslofjord met Oslo during the Middle Ages (about the year 1300). The part of the park located at the lake is 43 acres in addition to the water on 22 acres. The park facility at the ruins of St. Clement's Church is also considered for the park and this area is 4.7 acres, of the park that total is 70 acres.

Oslo Middelalderfestival and Øyafestivalen were annual events located in the park. In 2014, the event was moved to Tøyenparken. In 2014, Oslo Middelalderfestival was located at Akershus Castle.

== See also ==
- Minneparken
