= Gerhard Fischer (architect) =

Norwegian architect and archaeologist

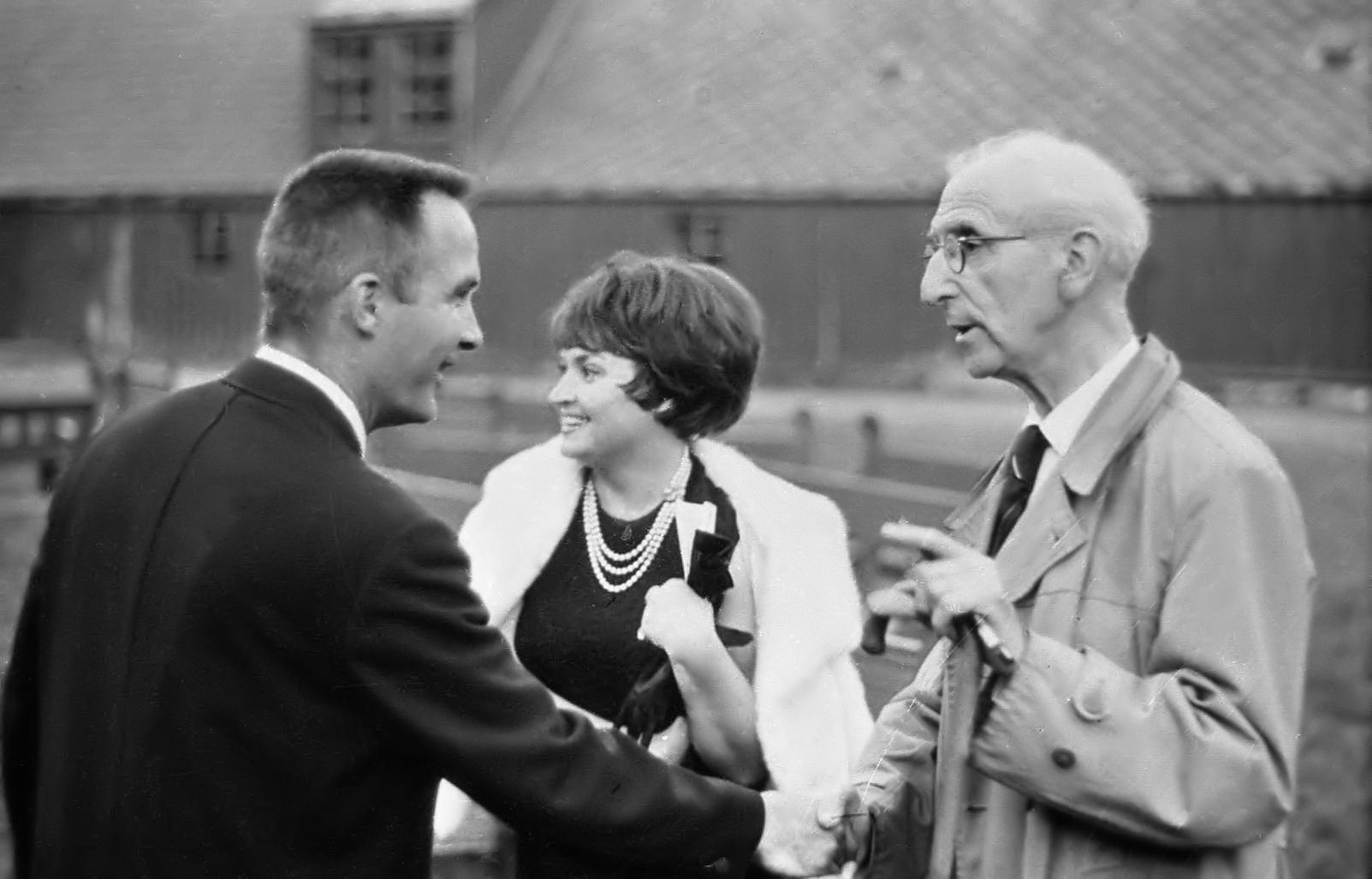
- Fischer (right) around 1967
- Born: 12 July 1890; Bergen, Norway
- Died: 10 September 1977 (aged 87); Oslo, Norway
- Occupations: Architect; Archeologist
- Spouse: Dorothea Stoud Fischer
- Awards: Medal of St. Hallvard; Order of St. Olav; Honorary member of Society of Antiquaries of Scotland; Honorary member of Society of Antiquaries of London

Gerhard Fischer (12 July 1890 – 10 September 1977) was a Norwegian architect and archaeologist.

== Biography ==
Johan Adolf Gerhard Fischer was born in Bergen, Norway. He was the son of architect Adolph Fischer (1844–1925) and Dorothea Margaretha Elisabeth Wilcken (1857–1943). Fischer studied at the Bergen Technical School (Bergens Tekniske Skole), the Norwegian National Academy of Craft and Art Industry (Statens håndverks- og kunstindustriskole) in Oslo and the Royal Danish Academy of Fine Arts (Det Kongelige Danske Kunstakademi) in Copenhagen.

From 1916 to 1926 he was employed by the Norwegian State Railways architectural office. During that period, he designed the Lillestrøm Station, Notodden Station, Åneby Station, Ljan Station and Bekkelaget Station.

From 1938 until 1960, he was employed as a conservator at Universitetets Oldsaksamling, now part of Museum of Cultural History in Oslo. He chaired several excavations of sites dating from the Middle Ages in Norway including Sverresborg in Trondheim and the Bergenhus Fortress in Bergen. He was also associated with archeological excavations at Utstein Abbey, Hovedøya Abbey, Tønsberg Fortress, Stavanger Cathedral, Nidarosdomen and the Archbishop's Palace in Trondheim. He also led the final stage of excavation in Minneparken at Gamlebyen in Oslo.

His books include Oslo under Eikaberg from 1950, Norske kongeborger (two volumes, 1951 and posthumously 1980), Domkirken i Stavanger from 1964, Domkirken i Trondheim (1965), and Utstein kloster from 1965.

He was awarded the Medal of St. Hallvard in 1956, and was decorated Commander of the Order of St. Olav in 1965. He was an honorary member of the Society of Antiquaries of Scotland, and of the Society of Antiquaries of London.

He married the art historian Dorothea Stoud Fischer.

== Gallery ==
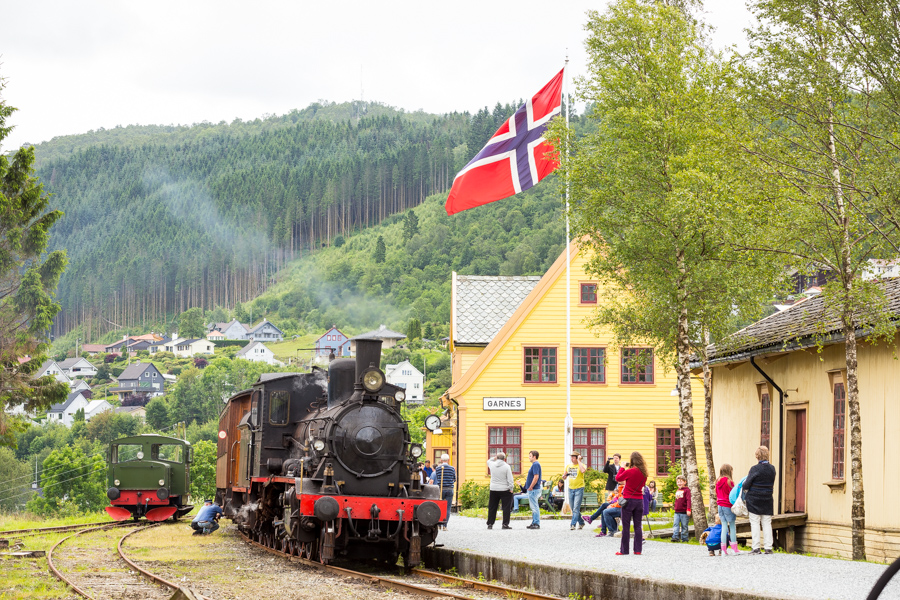
Garnes Station (1918)

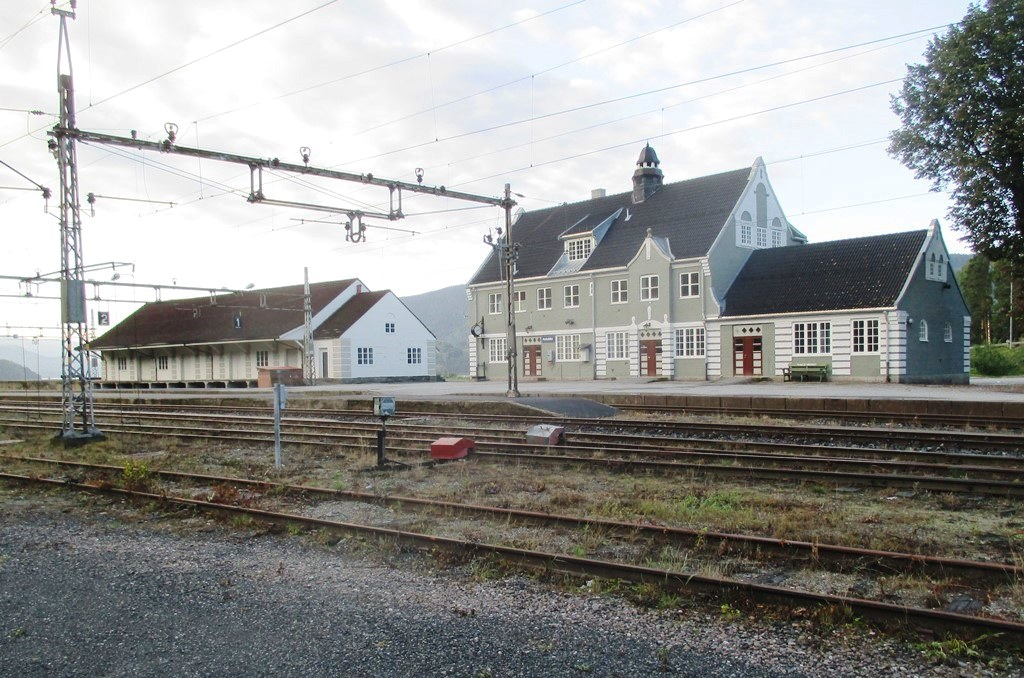
Notodden Station (1919)

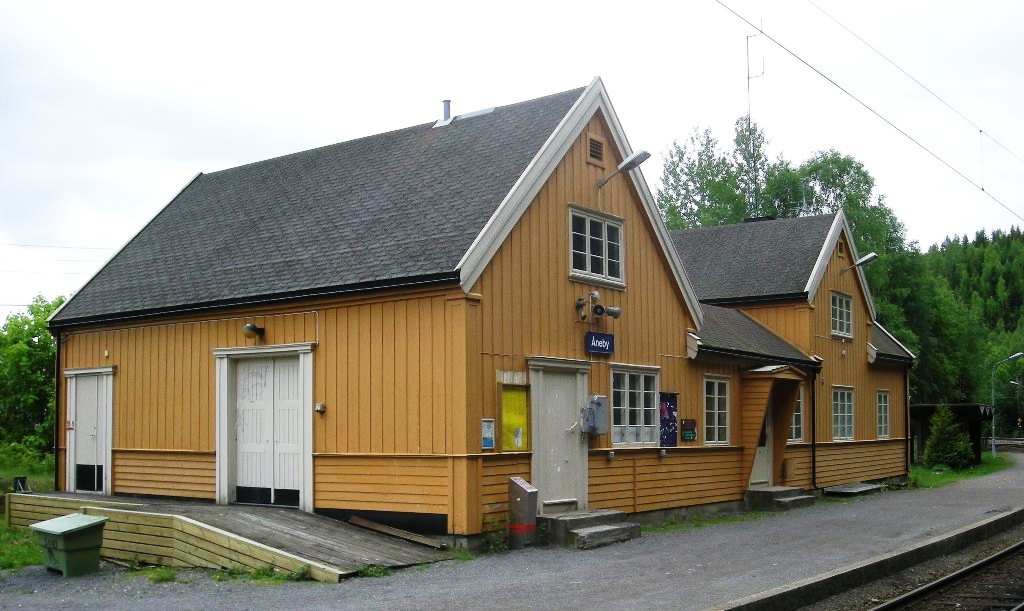
Åneby Station (1919)

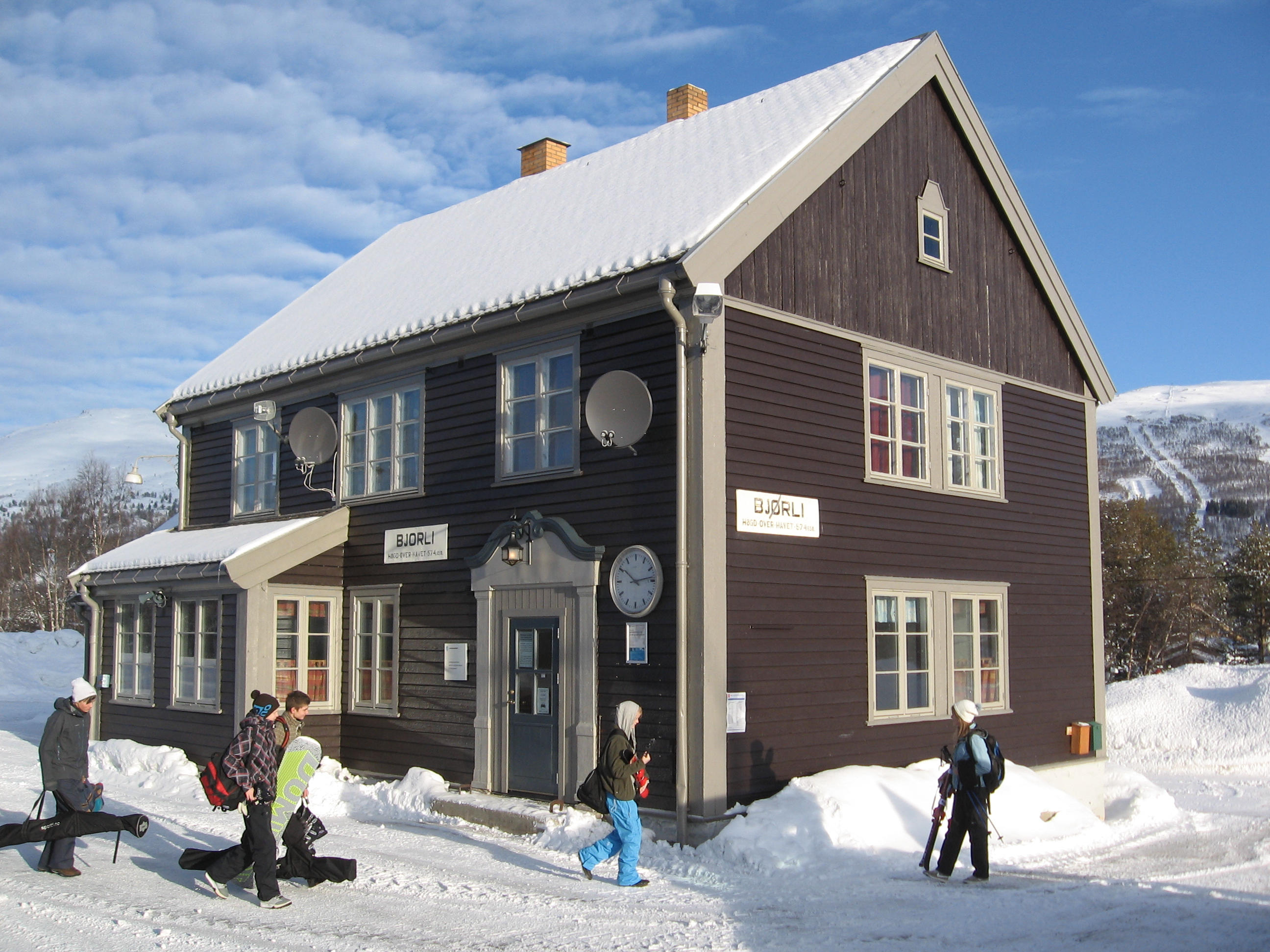
Bjorli Station (1923)

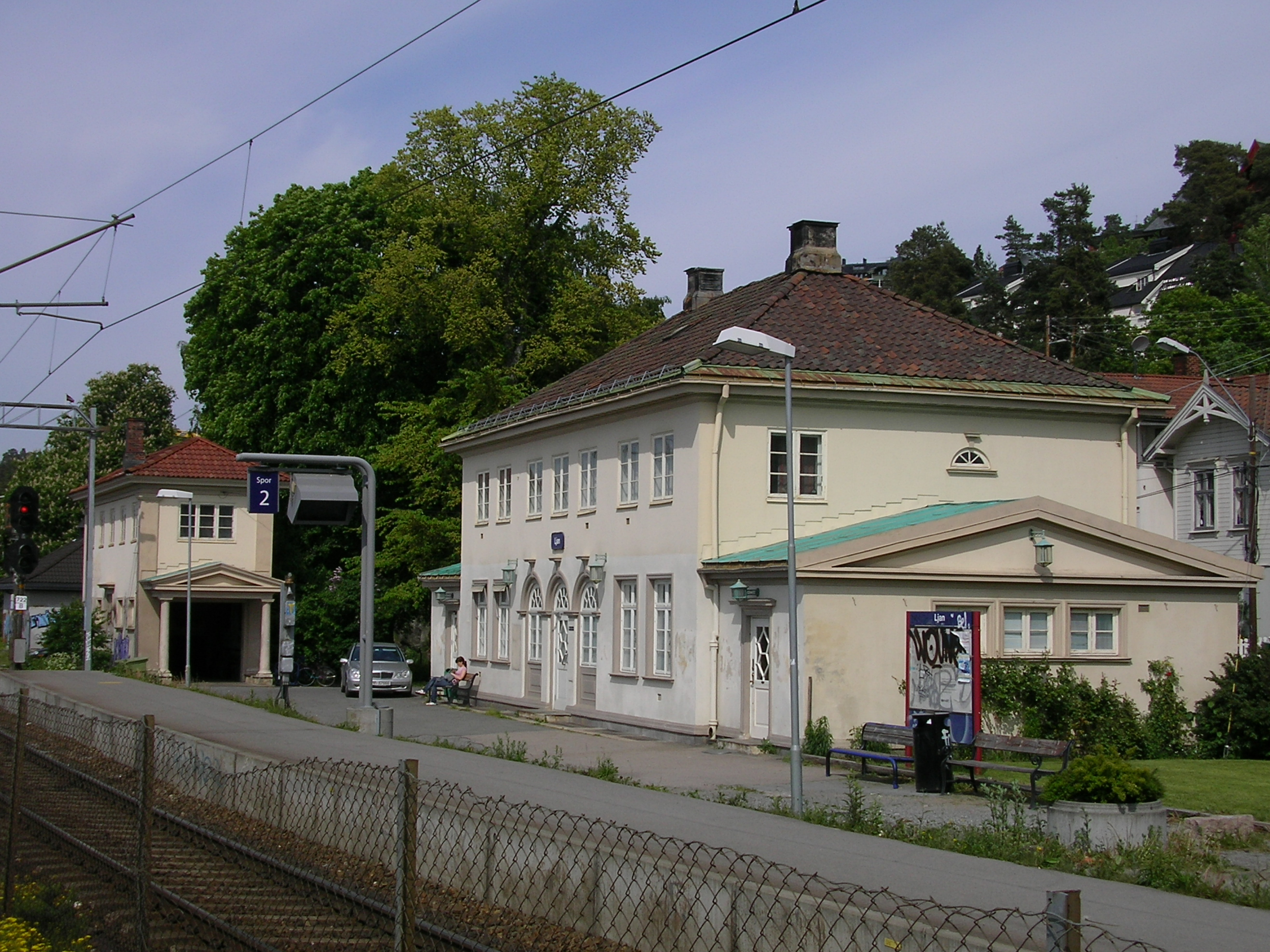
Ljan Station (1923)
