= St. Mary's Church, Oslo =

Church ruin in Oslo, Norway

Coordinates: 59.9035°N 10.7622°E

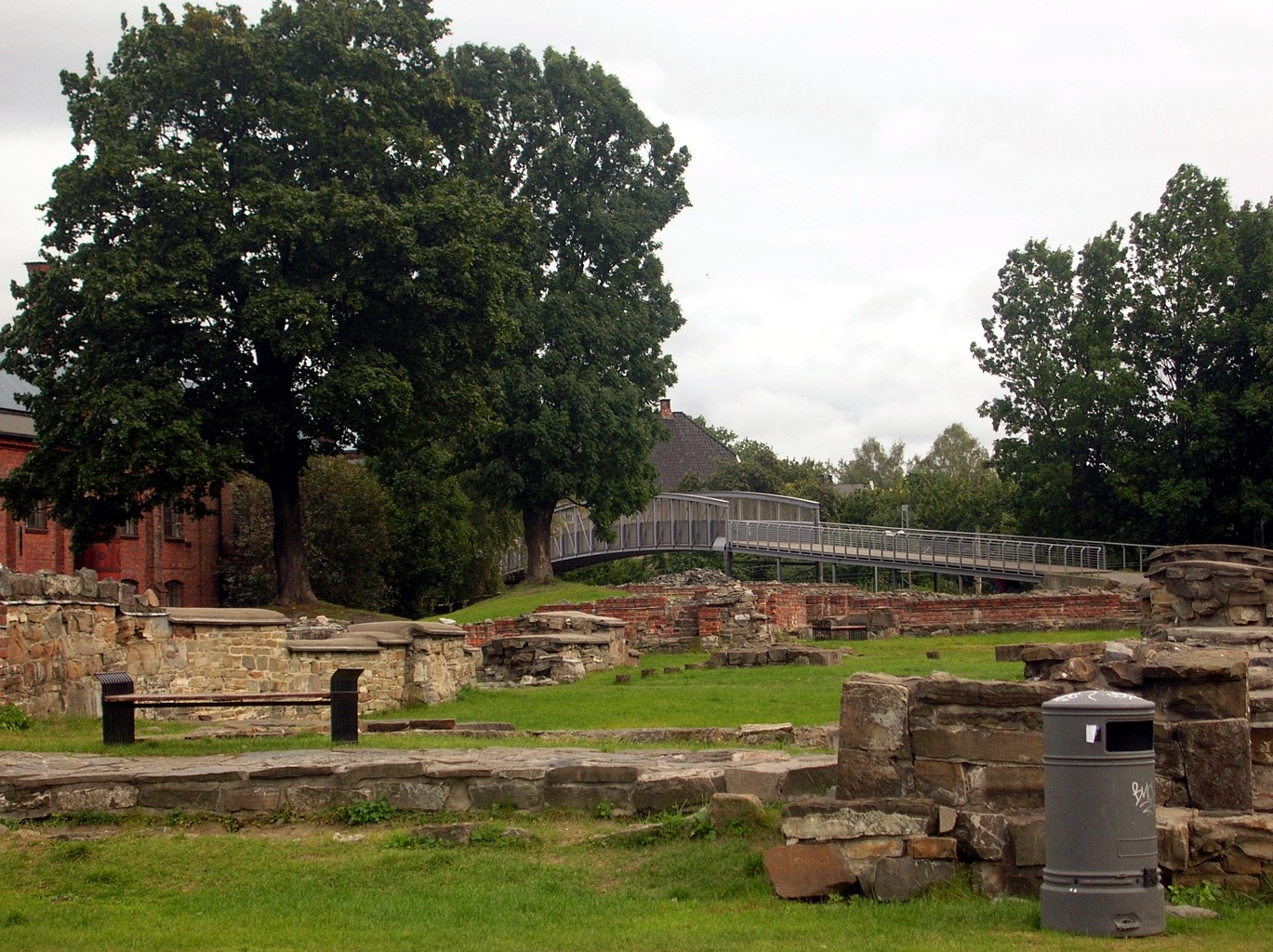
Ruins of St. Mary's Church at Middelalderparken in Oslo

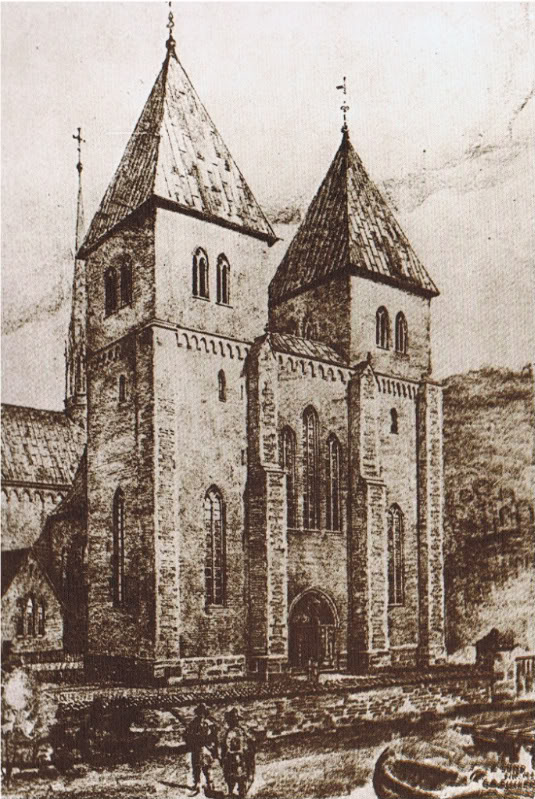
Drawing of St. Mary's Church, based on a reconstruction

St. Mary's Church (Norwegian: Mariakirken i Oslo) was a medieval church located in Oslo, Norway. The church ruins are located in Middelalderparken near the neighborhood of Sørenga in the borough of Gamlebyen. The area where the Norwegian Crown Prince Residence of Skaugum is located today in the municipality of Asker, originally belonged to the St. Mary's Church.
