= Old Town, Oslo =

Neighborhood in the inner city of Oslo, Norway

Coordinates: 59°54′20″N 10°46′6″E

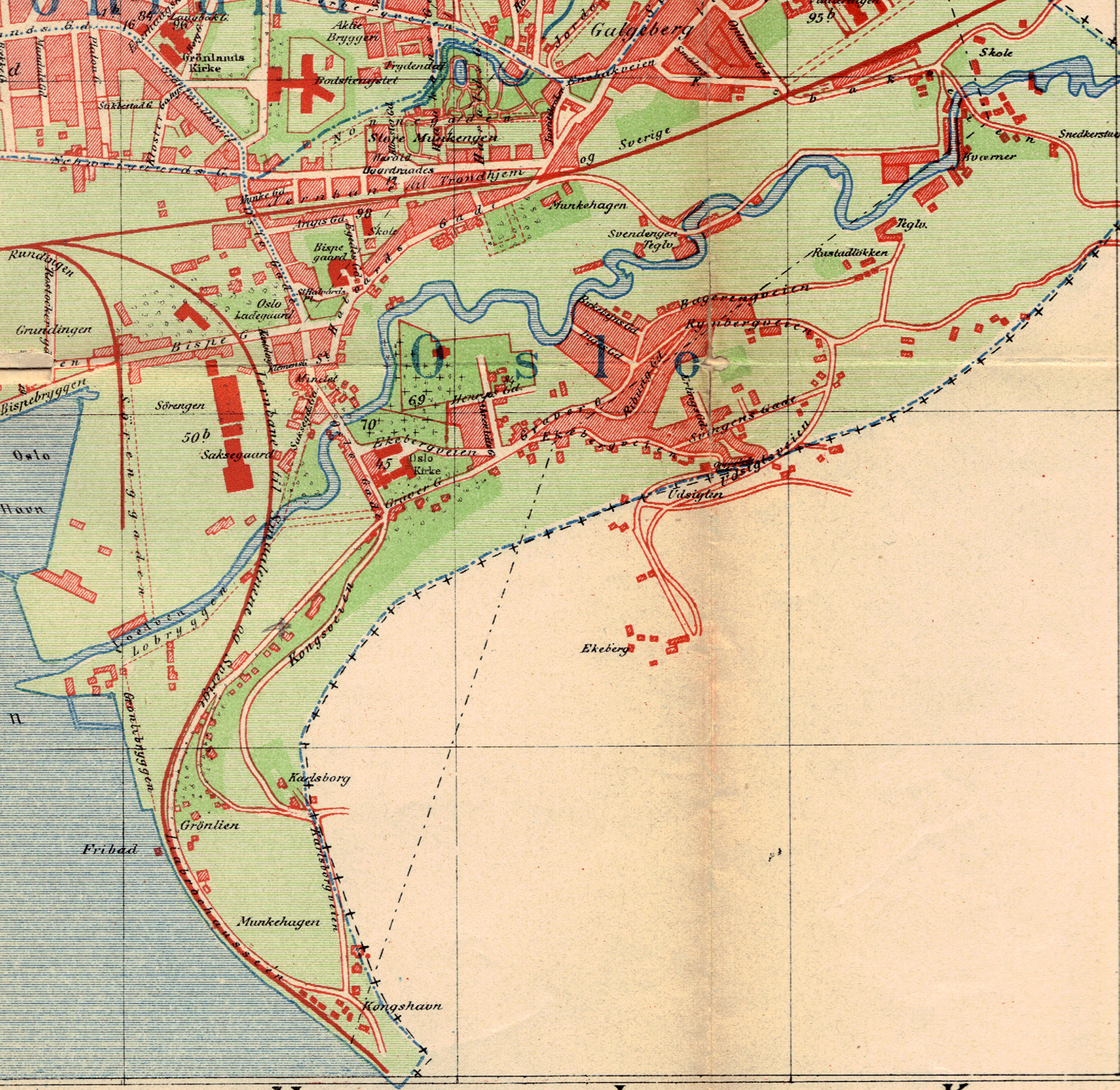
Map of Old Town, Oslo from year 1900

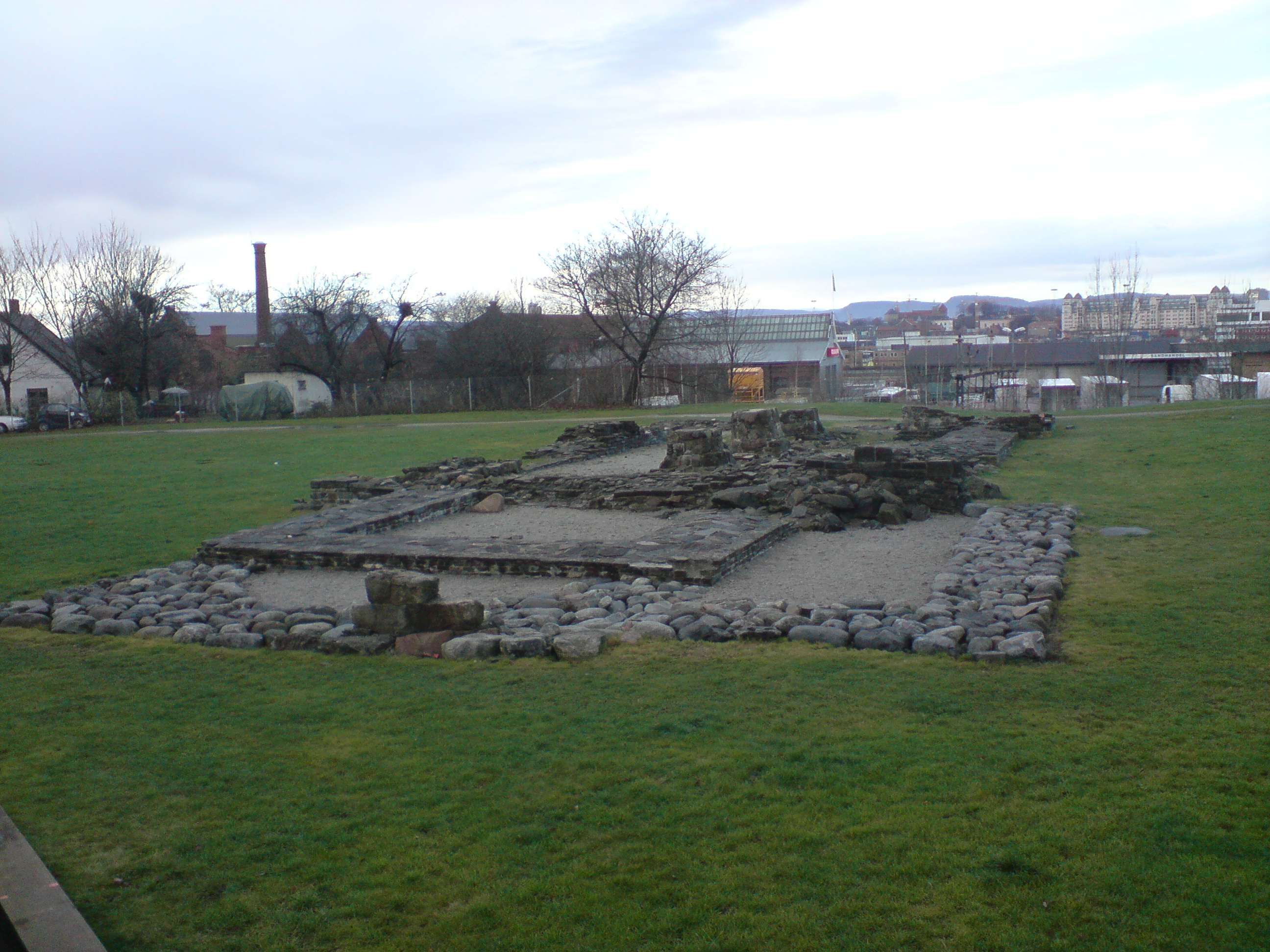
The ruins of St. Clement's Church, Oslo

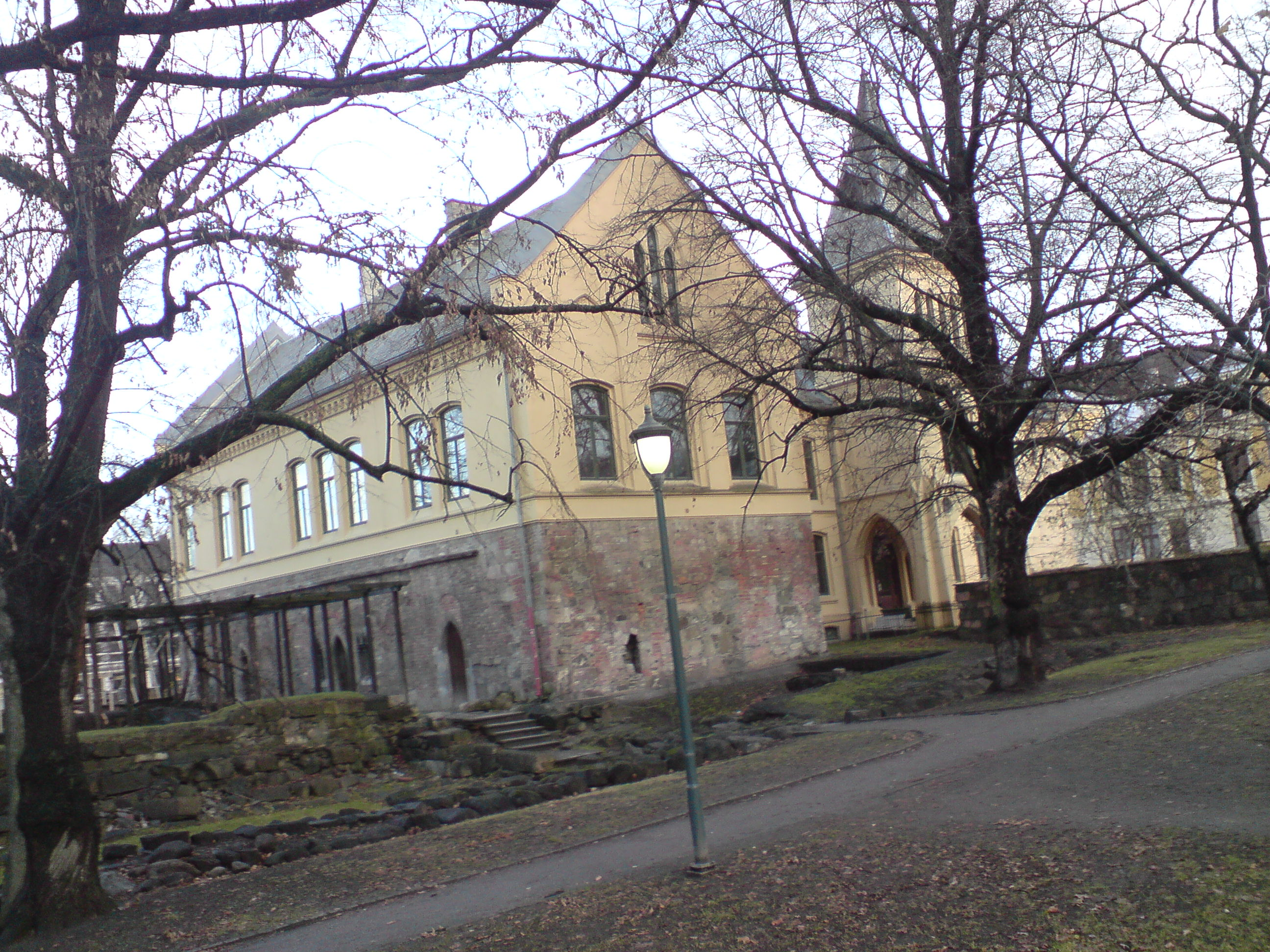
Current Oslo bishop's residence with the remains of St. Olav's Monastery as cellars

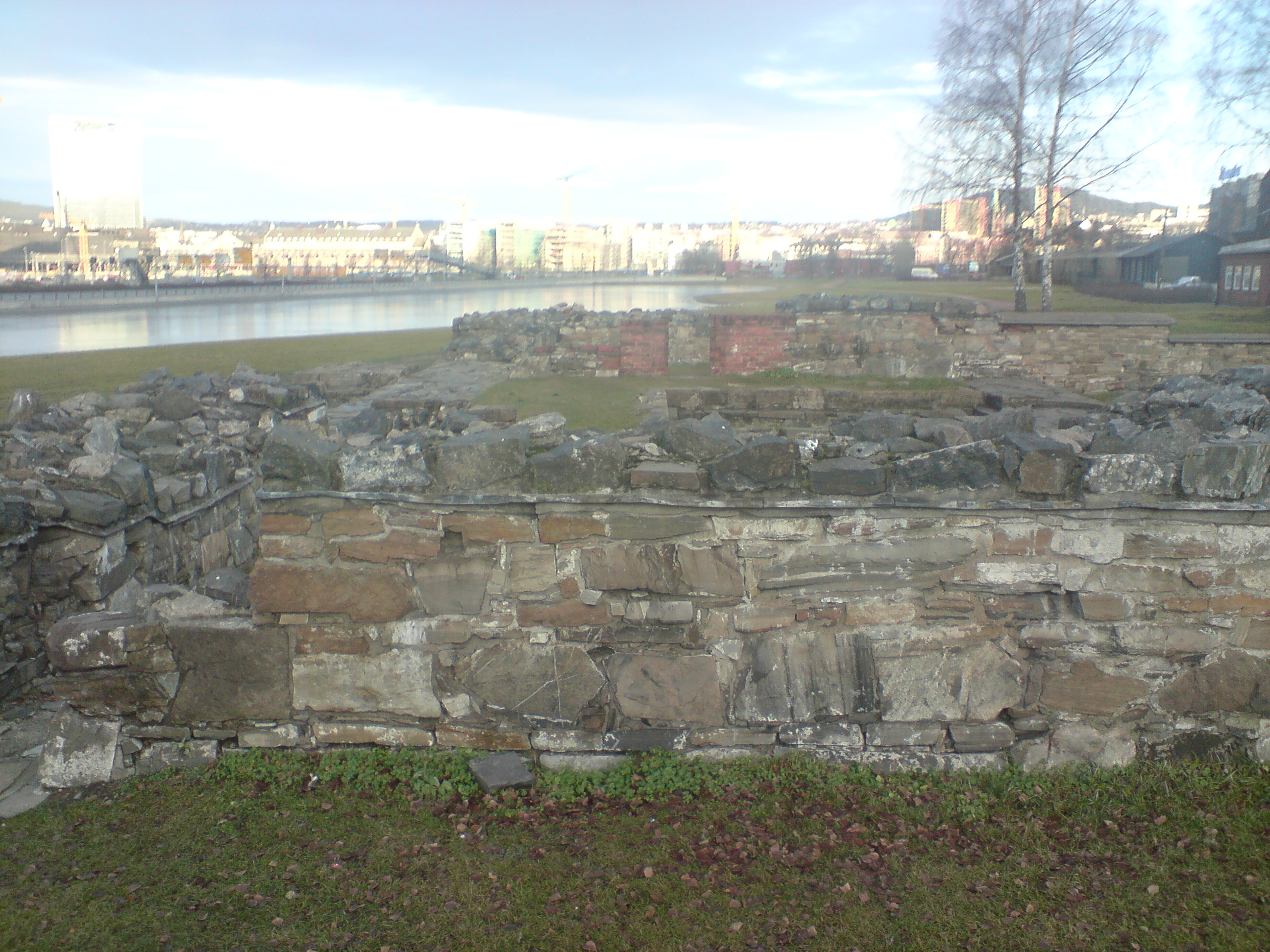
Ruins of St. Mary's Church, seen to the north, the water level indicating the shore of the Middle Ages and the settlement buildings of Bjørvika in the background

The Old Town of Oslo (Norwegian: Gamlebyen, pronounced [ˈɡɑmɽəˌby̌ːn]) is a neighbourhood in the inner city of Oslo, Norway, belonging to the borough of Gamle Oslo and is the oldest urban area within the current capital. This part of the capital of Norway was simply called Oslo until 1925 while the city as a whole was called Kristiania. Oslo's old town was established with the urban structure around the year 1000 and was the capital of Norway's dominion in 1314. The main Old Town area (i.e. the southern and central parts of Old Town) has several ruins of stone and brick lying above ground, and large amounts of protected culture underground. The core area also has listed 1700s buildings. Towards Ekeberg slope and further up are some 17th- and 18th-century wooden houses that are zoned for conservation under the Planning and Building Act, though there exist in the Old Town many four-storey brick houses, built at the end of the 1800s, and some heritage railway buildings from different eras.

== Medieval Oslo ==
The mediaeval town of Oslo is the area in which Oslo's mediaeval ruins of stone and brick are located. Ruins are located in the area known today as Old Town, roughly delineated by Hovin creek in the north, Alna river's original course to the south and east, and water associated with the Middelalderparken in the west. The Franciscan Monastery (partly covered by the Gamlebyen Church and Oslo Hospital) just east of Alna are also in the mediaeval town, despite its location on the "backside" of Alna. Also Akershus fortress and castle (begun in 1297) and the Hovedøya of the Cistercians former monastery belong to the mediaeval town. In the centre of the mediaeval town of Oslo is a square, the city's oldest market. The market was in the area where today's street intersections Oslogate - Bispegata are located.

Mediaeval Oslo had its heyday in the 1300s, when Haakon V Magnusson ruled first as duke (1284–1299) and then as king (1299–1319).

== Church centre ==
Oslo was a village with St. Clement's Church and cemetery already extant around the year 1000. According to Snorri's Heimskringla, the city was built by King Harald Hardrada in 1050. Subsequent archaeological excavations and research have established that Oslo had an urban structure as early as the end of the Viking Age. Towards the end of the 11th century, King Olav Kyrre made the city a bishop's seat. Around the year 1100 Oslo's former two stave churches, the old Clement's Church and Old St. Mary's Church, were replaced with stone churches. King Sigurd the Crusader began St. Hallvard's Cathedral in the early 12th century. The cathedral was named after St. Hallvard of Husaby in Lier, Norway, who was shot when he tried to save an innocent pregnant woman who was accused of theft from two men. The church's most important sections were completed by 1130 when King Sigurd was buried in the chancel south wall, and the body of St. Hallvard was moved from his former grave in Lier and placed in a magnificent silver casket that was placed on the high altar. He was Oslo's patron saint.

King Haakon IV Haakonsson built a new royal residence in stone and brick. The bishop replaced a former bishop's palace with a new stone, Oslo Bishop's Castle. The Dominican monastery (St. Olav's Monastery) was built close to the somewhat older St. Olaf's Church.

In around 1290 the Franciscans established their monastery in the south-eastern outskirts of town upon the north-facing slope of Ekeberg (current Ekeberg slope). In 1299 King Eirik II Magnusson died. As he had no sons, his brother took over the throne as Haakon V Magnusson. King Haakon had Oslo as his ducal seat while his brother was king, and he made Oslo his permanent royal residence. At the same time he started construction of the Akershus Fortress, as weapons development made the palace an easy target for artillery from Ekeberg Hill. In the early 1300s, St. Mary's Church was converted into a large brick cathedral with two strong west towers – a landmark for the entrance to the city.

In 1314 the king decided that the dean of St. Mary's Church was to be made Chancellor, and be given the State seal of "forever", and so he made Oslo the capital of the kingdom of Norway. King Haakon died in 1319, and was buried in St. Mary's Church. Under Hakon Magnusson, the city reached its peak in cultural diversity.

== Destruction ==
After King Haakon's death the political situation became unclear and the city experienced an economic downturn. Not least the Black Death of 1348 and several subsequent plague epidemics and fires were setbacks. In 1397 the Kalmar Union was established. After the Protestant Reformation in 1537, all church and monastery properties were confiscated by the Danish-Norwegian king who had his main residence in Copenhagen, and Oslo lost the last remnants of being an economic centre. There were several attempts to move the city closer to Akershus Fortress, but the citizens rebuilt the town on fire sites. After a fire in 1624 (research shows that this may have been the 14th fire), Christian IV forced the inhabitants to rebuild the town around the fortress of Akershus. The old town was covered with soil and turned into farmland to ensure supplies to the garrison of the fort.

As the Old Town became part of the capital of Oslo in 1859, it was ordered that brick houses be built in this area. The main part of the current Old Town buildings stems from the construction boom in the late 1800s. Many new streets were laid out that broke with the Old Town's original footprint.

Today the Old Town (Gamlebyen) is an area in the borough of Gamle Oslo, characterised by apartment buildings from the late 1800s and some shops, restaurants and pubs. The area was formerly dominated by noise from automobile and railroad traffic, but most traffic has been placed underground in recent years and the area is now much quieter.

== Historical monuments ==
- Oslo Ladegård.
- "Bishop Nicholas' Chapel". Rooms from Old Bishop's Palace in Oslo, rebuilt in the 20th century.
- Ruin Park (Memorial Park) with the ruins of St. Hallvard's Cathedral and the Holy Cross Church. Besides Olav's Monastery, partially ruined, partial basement in the current bishop of Oslo's palace.
- The mediaeval park (Middelalderparken) with the ruins of St. Mary's Church (Royal Chapel), the former Royal Palace and St. Clement's Church. In recent years the park has been the scene of the festival Oslo Medieval Festival.
- Oslo Hospital, established in 1538 in the former Franciscan monastery (founded ca. 1290). Oldest existing building: Gamlebyen Church, originally from the 13th century. Gamlebyen Church, formerly Oslo Hospital Church, was built on the site of the Franciscan monastery from 1290. The old abbey, originally built in the 1290s, was destroyed by fire and has undergone changes many times. However, the walls of the mediaeval church remain today. The church obtained its present form in 1796 after a fire. Restored under the supervision of architect William K. Essendrop in time from 1934 to 1939. Church bells are from 1705.
- Gamlebyen gravlund, the Old Town's Cemetery. Among those buried are "Eidsvoll man" Christian Magnus Falsen and painter Adolph Tidemand, in addition to many of the first railway employees; and the British railway guide publisher George Bradshaw, who died in Oslo in 1853.

== See also ==
- History of Oslo
- History of Oslo's name
- History of Norway
- Gamlebyen Line
