= St. Hallvard's Cathedral =

Cathedral ruin in Oslo, Norway

Coordinates: 59°54′21.1″N 10°46′7.55″E

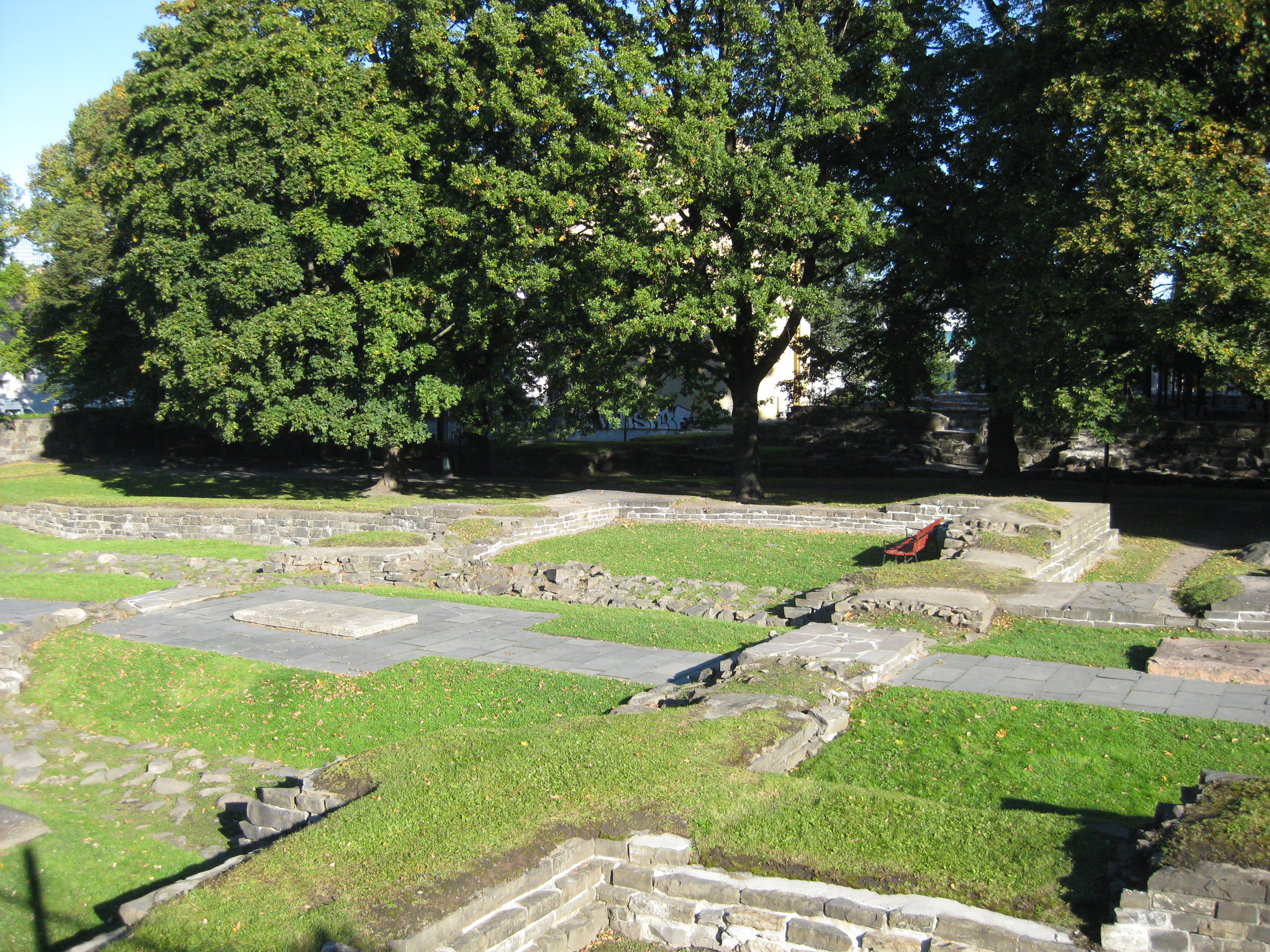
St. Hallvard's Cathedral Church ruins in Oslo, Norway at Memorial Park in Old Town (Minneparken i Gamlebyen)

St. Hallvard's Cathedral (Hallvardskatedralen) was the former Oslo Cathedral. It fell into disrepair in the 17th century and is today in ruins. The site is located between Bispegata and St. Halvards gate in Oslo, Norway.

== Summary ==
St. Hallvard's Church was the earliest cathedral in Oslo. The cathedral was built during the early 12th century. Oslo was abandoned after a devastating fire in 1624 and the foundation of a new city, Christiania, about one kilometre further west. St. Hallvard's Cathedral was used as a church until about 1655. Besides being the bishop's seat and religious center of eastern Norway for about 500 years, the cathedral was the coronation church, royal wedding church, chapel royal, and one of Scandinavia's most visited places of pilgrimage. St. Hallvard cemetery is located mainly south of the cathedral. It was the honorary cemetery in Oslo and eastern Norway from around 1130 to 1639. Bishops and other prominent men and women were interred in the church along with Norwegian kings.

First excavations of the ruins were conducted in 1865 by Nicolay Nicolaysen. Towards the end of the 1800s, Bispegata was extended in an easterly direction over the cathedral site. In the early 1920s, Johan Adolf Gerhard Fischer (1890–1977) led the final stage of excavation. Parts of the ruins were removed by digging for a culvert for the Østfold Line in between 1920 and 1922. The cathedral was the main attraction when Memorial Park in Old Town (Minneparken i Gamlebyen) opened in 1932. Neighboring the site of the former cathedral are the ruins of the medieval parish church, Holy Cross Church (Korskirken).

== Prominent interments ==
- King Sigurd the Crusader
- King Magnus the Blind
- King Inge I of Norway

== See also ==
- St. Hallvard's Church and Monastery

== Gallery ==
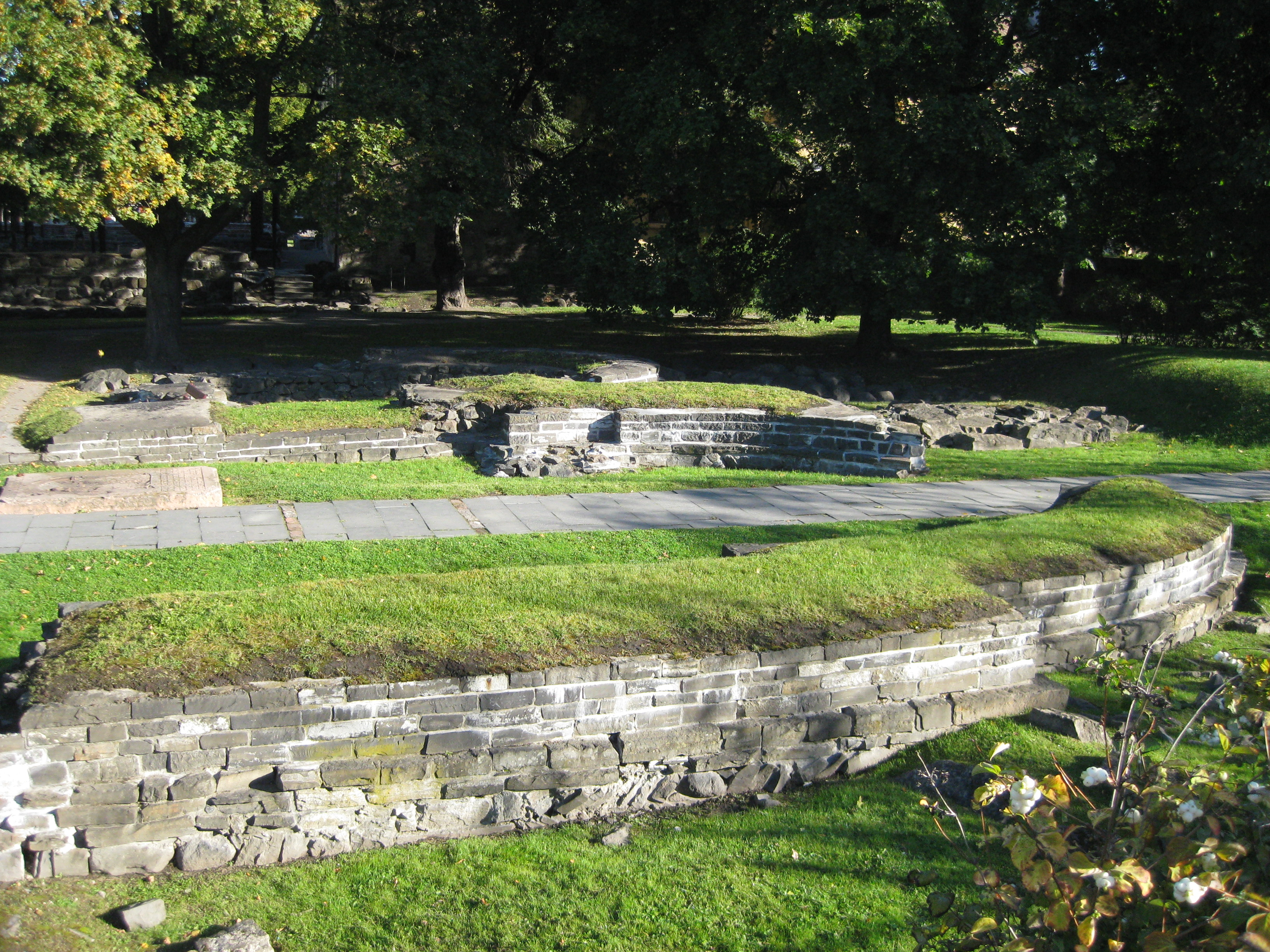

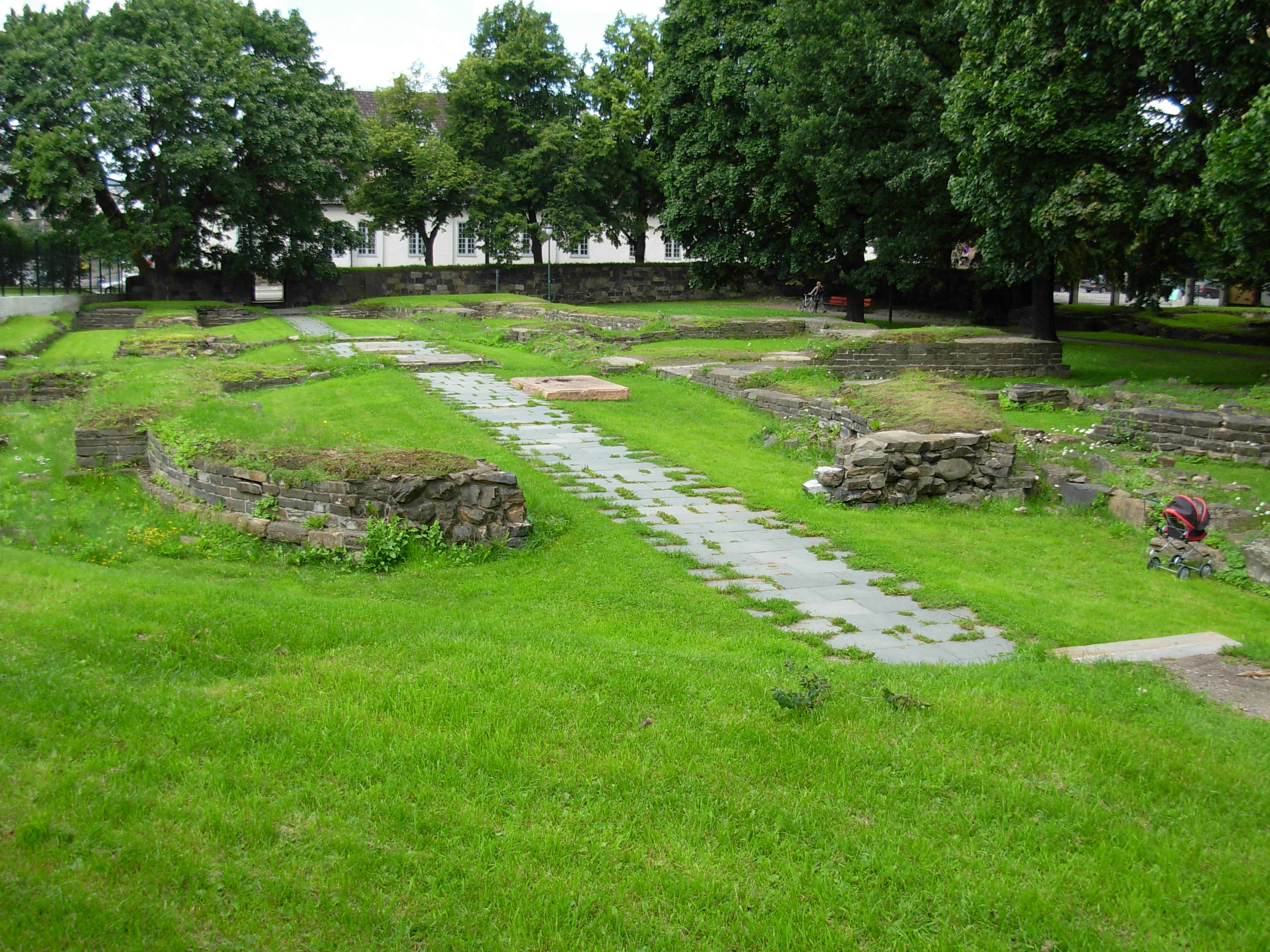

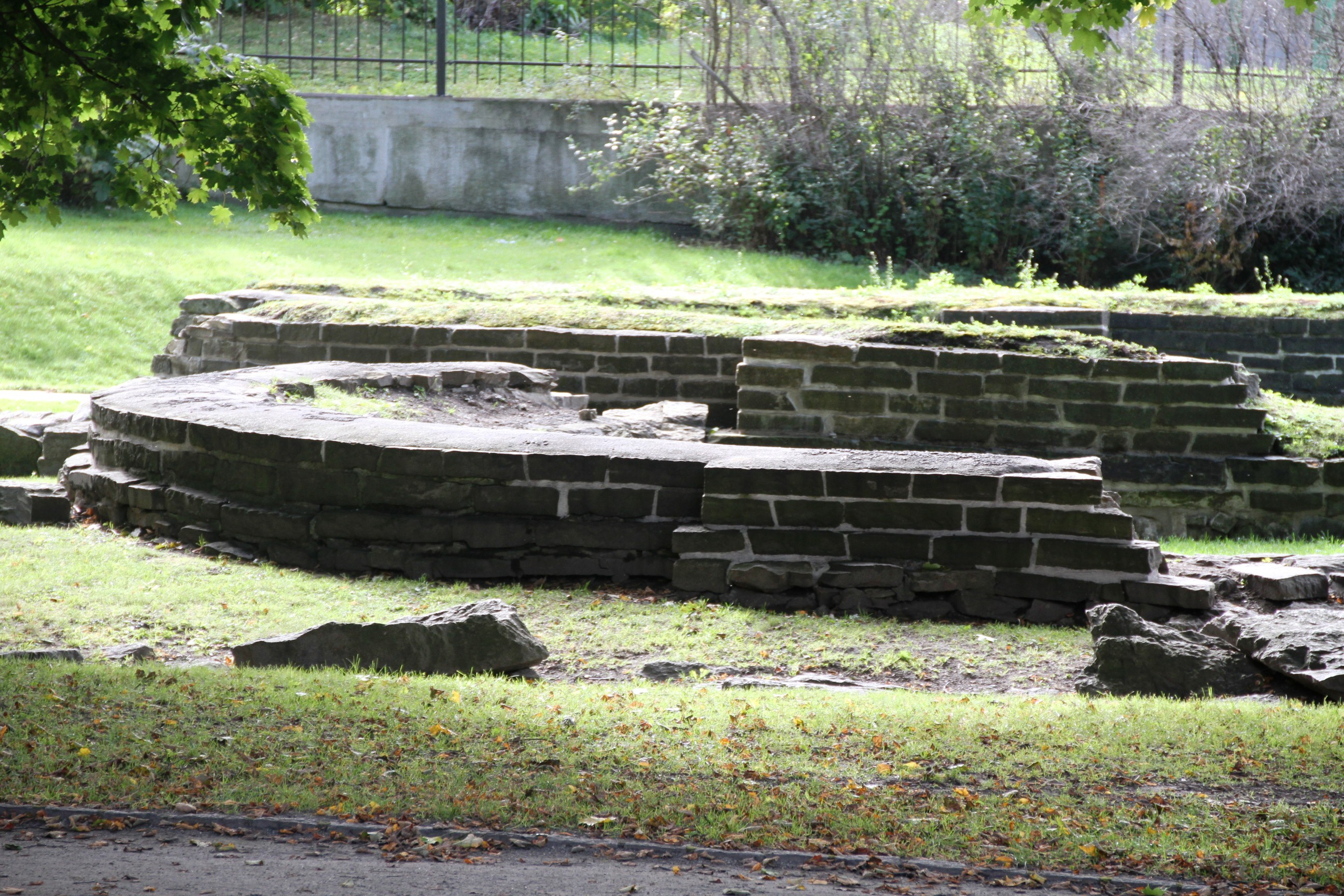

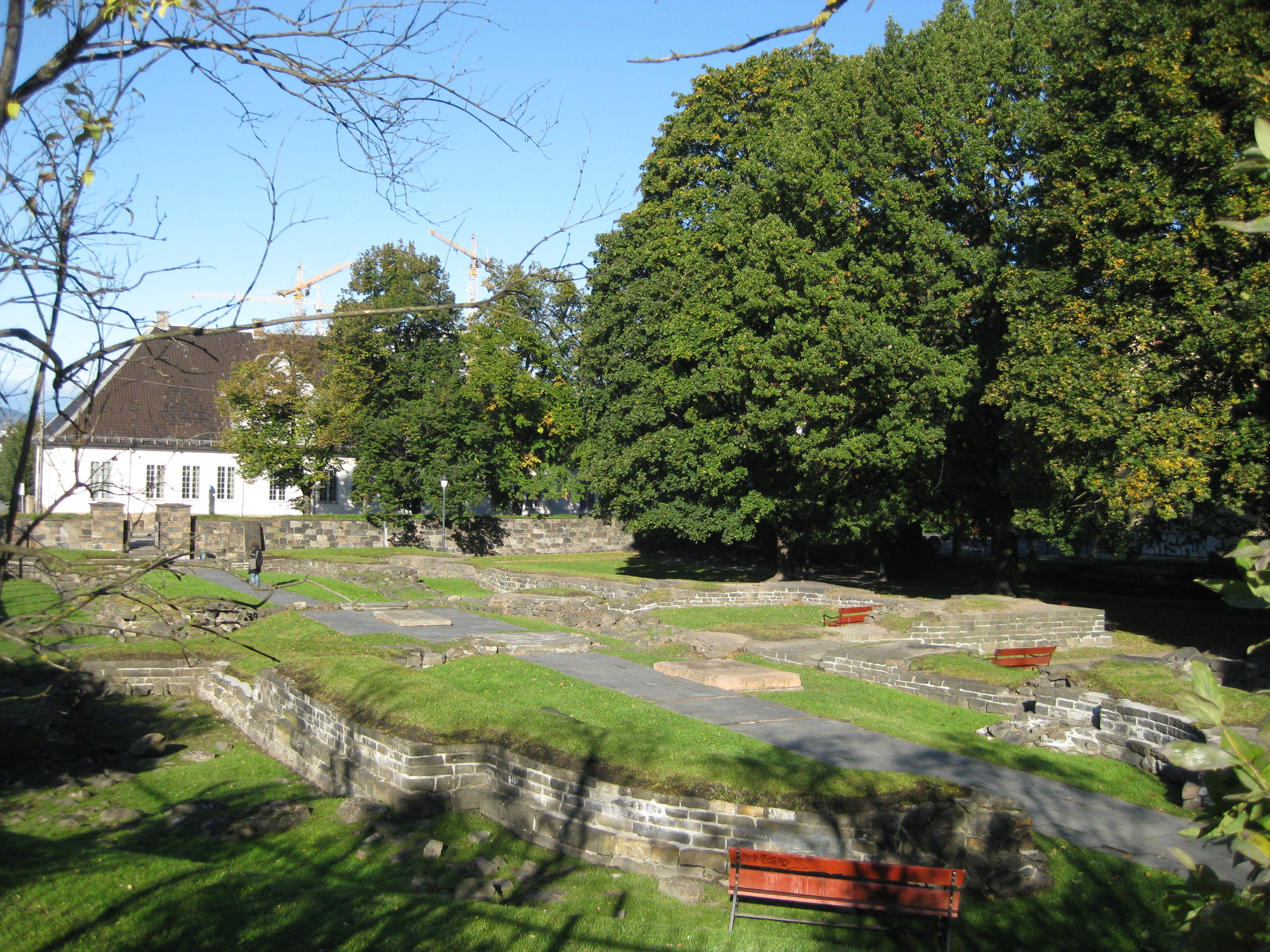
