= Oslo-Fergene =

Passenger ferry operator in Oslo, Norway

Oslo Fergene AS
- Type: Private
- Industry: Transport
- Founded: 1917
- Headquarters: Oslo, Norway
- Area served: Oslo
- Website: www.oslo-fergene.no

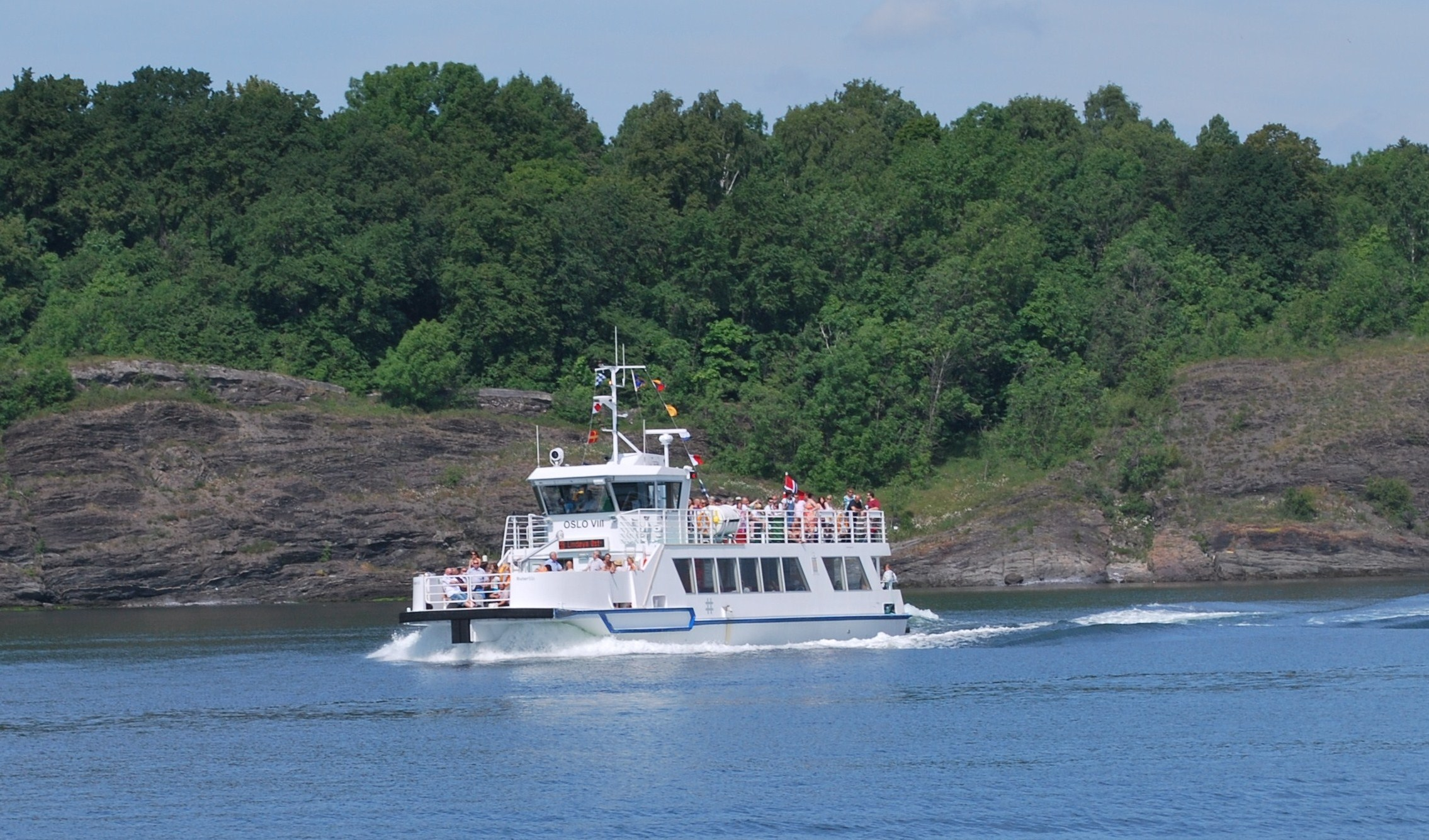
Ferry on its way from Vippetangen to Bleikøya. Hovedøya in the background.

Oslo Fergene was a passenger ferry operator in Oslo, Norway.

The company had contracts with Ruter to operated ferries from Vippetangen, up till 2015, and then from Oslo City Hall to the islands of Hovedøya, Bleikøya, Gressholmen, Lindøya, Nakholmen and Langøyene on routes 91–94. In 2014, the ferries carried 700,000 passengers, a record number. In 2016, Oslo-Fergene announced they had the world's first passenger ferry to run on renewable diesel.

On October 31st, 2021, the company completed its last voyages.
