= Gamle Oslo =

Borough of Oslo, Norway

Coordinates: 59.9129°N 10.7819°E

Bydel Gamle Oslo
- Borough
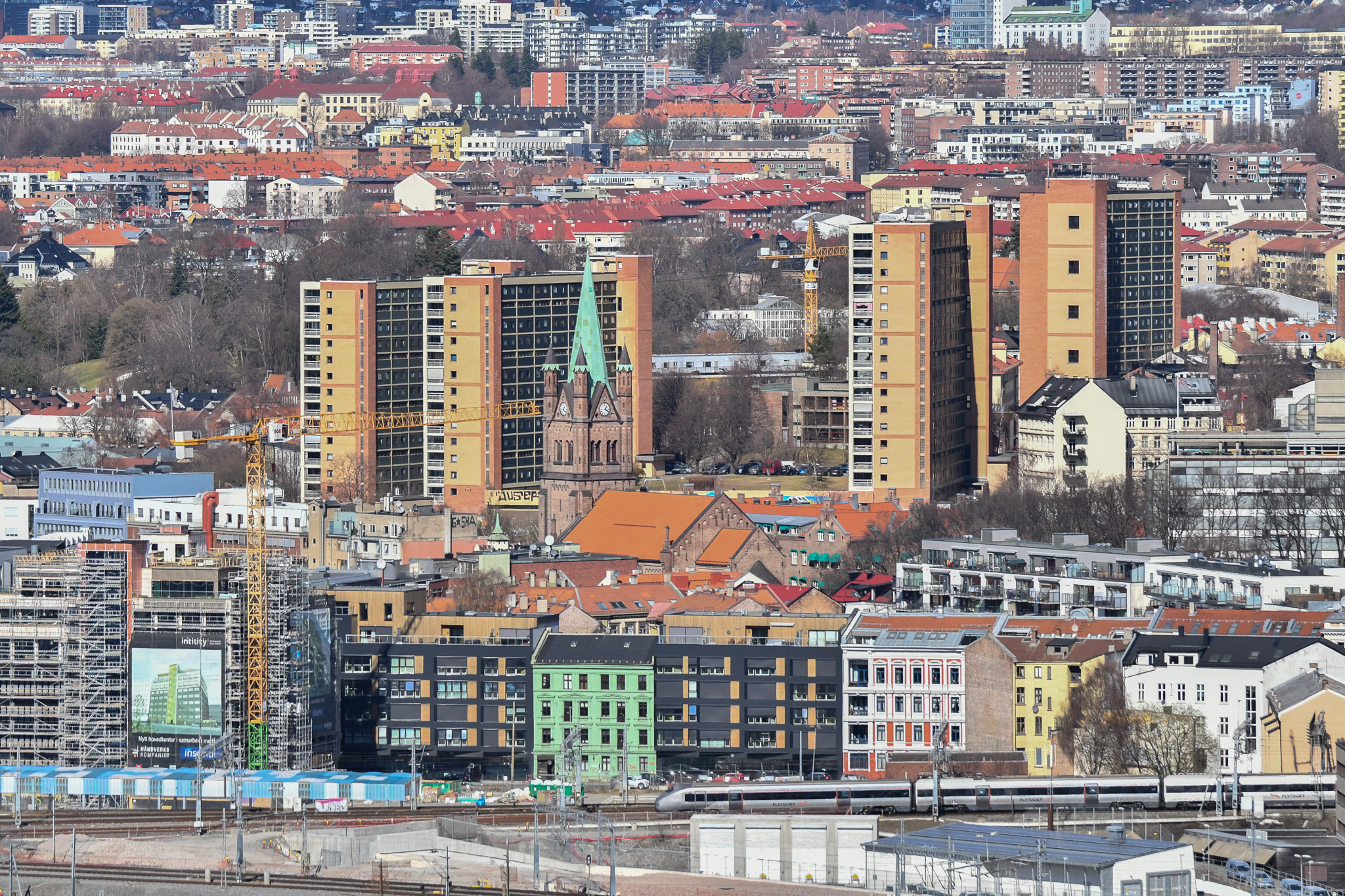
- Grønland og blokkene på Enerhaugen sett fra Ekeberg

- Coat of arms

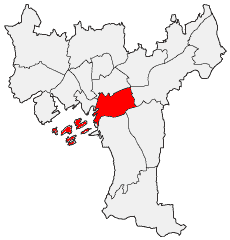
- Country: Norway
- City: Oslo

Area
  - Total: 7.45 km^{2} (2.88 sq mi)

Population (2020)
  - Total: 58,671
  - Density: 7,875/km^{2} (20,400/sq mi)
- Time zone: UTC+1 (CET)
  - Summer (DST): UTC+2 (CEST)
- ISO 3166 code: NO-030101
- Website: bgo.oslo.kommune.no

Gamle Oslo is a borough of the city of Oslo, Norway. The name means "Old Oslo", and the district contains Old Town.

The borough has several landmarks and large parks, including the Edvard Munch Museum, the Botanical Gardens and a medieval park.

During the time that present Oslo was named Christiania, this area was called Oslo. H. P. Lovecraft alludes to the fact in his story The Call of Cthulhu:

One autumn day I landed at the trim wharves in the shadow of the Egeberg. Johansen's address, I discovered, lay in the Old Town of King Harald Hardrada, which kept alive the name of Oslo during all the centuries that the greater city masqueraded as "Christiana".

Neighborhoods of Oslo belonging to this borough are:

- Ekebergskråningen
- Enerhaugen
- Ensjø
- Etterstad
- Gamlebyen
- Grønland
- Helsfyr
- Kampen
- Tøyen
- Vålerenga
- Valle-Hovin

The borough also includes islands and islets in the Oslofjord: Kavringen, Nakholmen, Lindøya, Hovedøya, Bleikøya, Gressholmen, Rambergøya, Langøyene and Heggholmen. In the Oslo borough reform in 2004, the borough Helsfyr-Sinsen was removed, and the neighborhoods Ensjø, Etterstad Valle-Hovin and Helsfyr were included in Gamle Oslo.

In the municipal election of 2007 all borough councils became elective, until then most had been appointed by the city council. Labour became the largest party with five representatives, the Socialist Left have three, the Conservatives, Liberals and the Red Electoral Alliance two each, and the Progress party one.

== Politics ==
As a borough of Oslo, Gamle Oslo is governed by the city council of Oslo as well as its own borough council. The council leader is Emil Snorre Alnæs from the Green Party and the deputy leader is Agnes Viljugrein, of the Labour Party. The Green Party has the most seats. The 15 seats are distributed among the following political parties for the 2019–2023 term:

- 4 from the Green Party (Miljøpartiet de Grønne)
- 3 from the Labour Party (Arbeiderpartiet)
- 2 from the Conservative Party (Høyre)
- 2 from the Socialist Left Party (Sosialistisk Venstreparti)
- 2 from the Red Party (Rødt)
- 1 from the Liberal Party (Venstre)
- 1 from the Progress Party (Fremskrittspartiet)

== Squatting ==
Places formerly known for squatting, includes Brakkebygrenda (a.k.a. Brækkers).

== Gallery ==
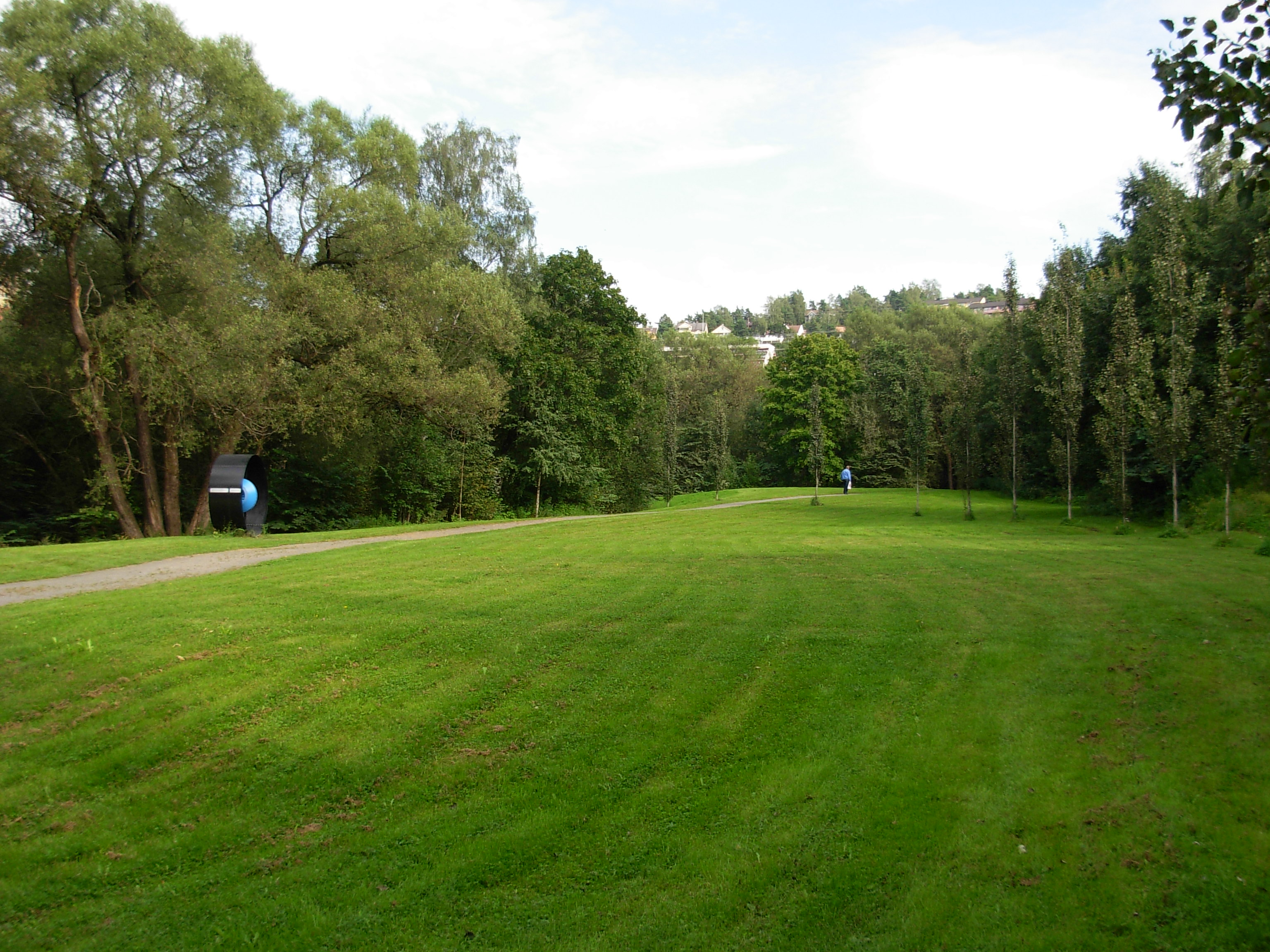
Svartdalsparken

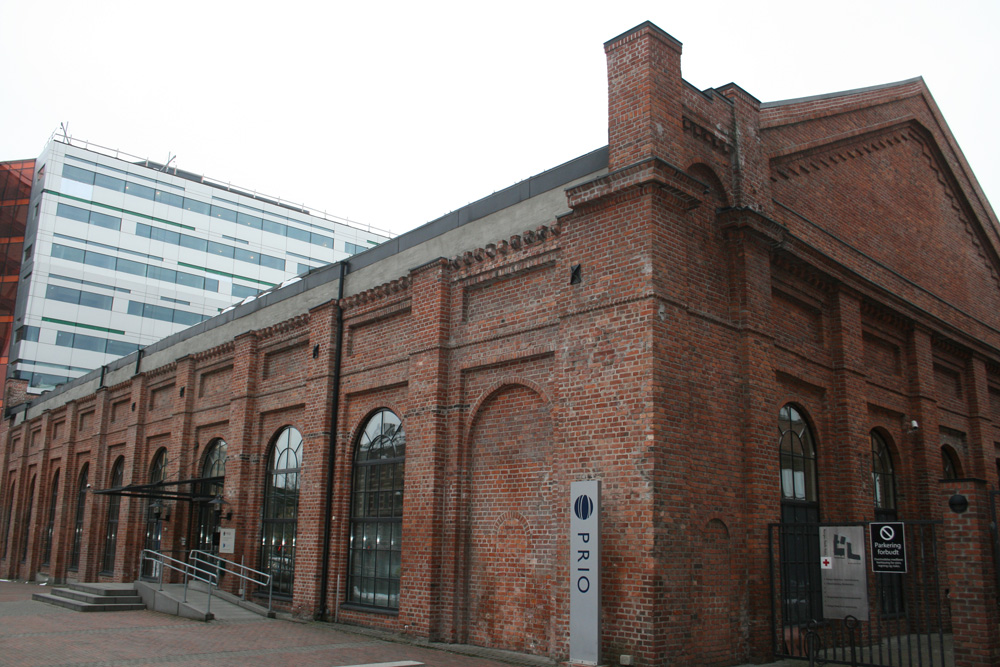
Office building of the Peace Research Institute of Oslo
