= Gressholmen =

Island in Oslo, Norway

Coordinates: 59°53′04″N 10°43′13″E

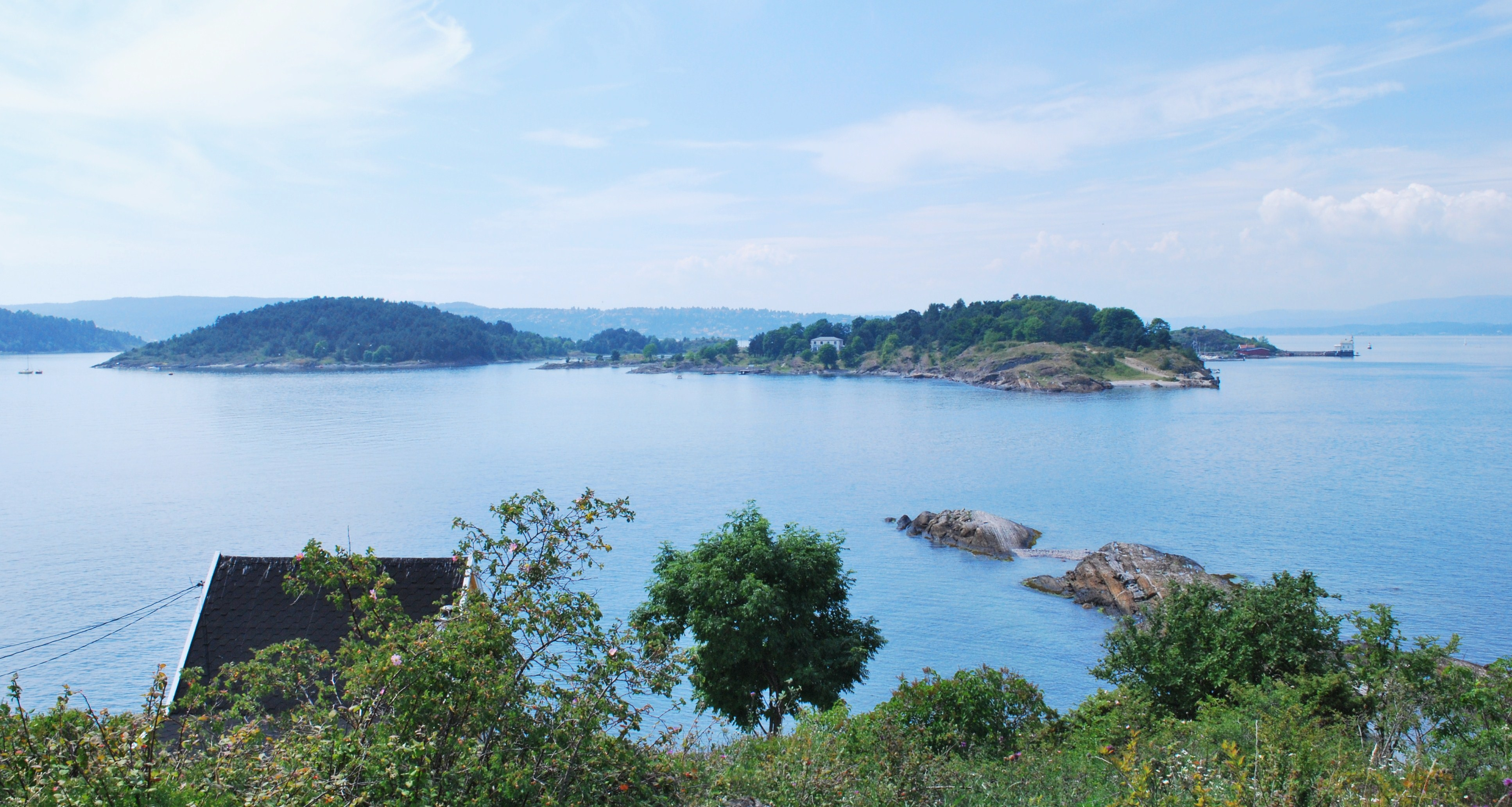
Gresholmen, seen from Bleikøya

Gressholmen is an islet located in the Oslofjord, just south of central Oslo. Administratively it belongs to the borough of Gamle Oslo.

Gressholmen airport was for the years 1927 through 1939 the location of the main airport for Oslo, until the construction of Fornebu airport. The airport was only for seaplanes. The ramp with rail tracks and the hangar are reused for boat storage and maintenance. There is railway point with the big track gauge.

The island is easily accessible from Oslo with the local ferries. The access point is on the North side.

A big part of the island is a nature reserve.

== The name ==
The first element is gress ('grass') - the last element is the finite form of holme ('islet'). The island is today connected with the two former islands of Rambergøya ('Raven rock island') and Heggholmen ('hagberry islet').
