= Lindøya =

Island in Oslo, Norway

Coordinates: 59.8906°N 10.7119°E

Lindøya is a small island located in the Oslofjord, just south of central Oslo. Administratively it belongs to the borough of Gamle Oslo.

In 1920, Lindøya was the Oslo base for the pioneer Norwegian airline, Det Norske Luftfartrederi, and its seaplanes. The operation only lasted until the autumn of 1920. When regular seaplane routes were again established in 1927, the operation was moved to neighboring Gressholmen.

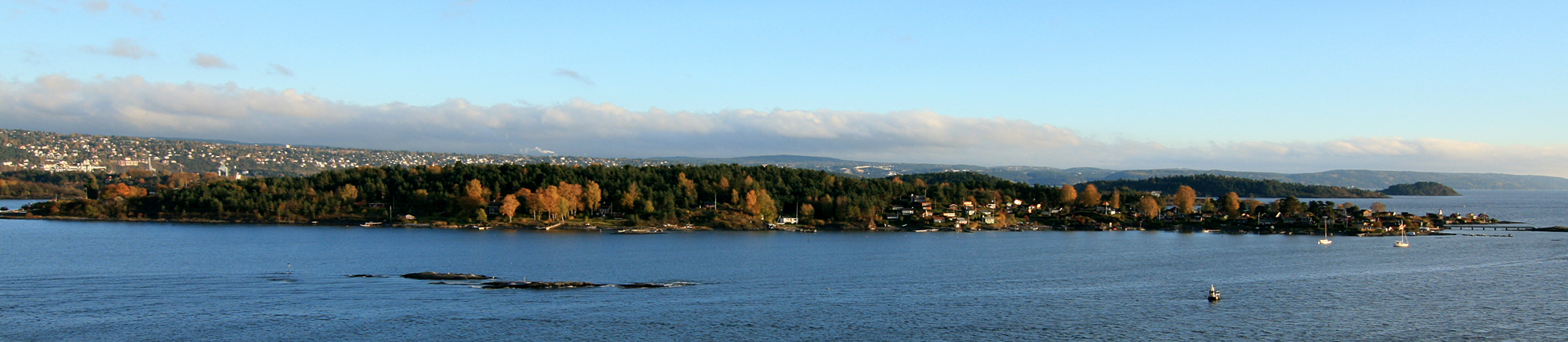

== Visiting Lindøya ==
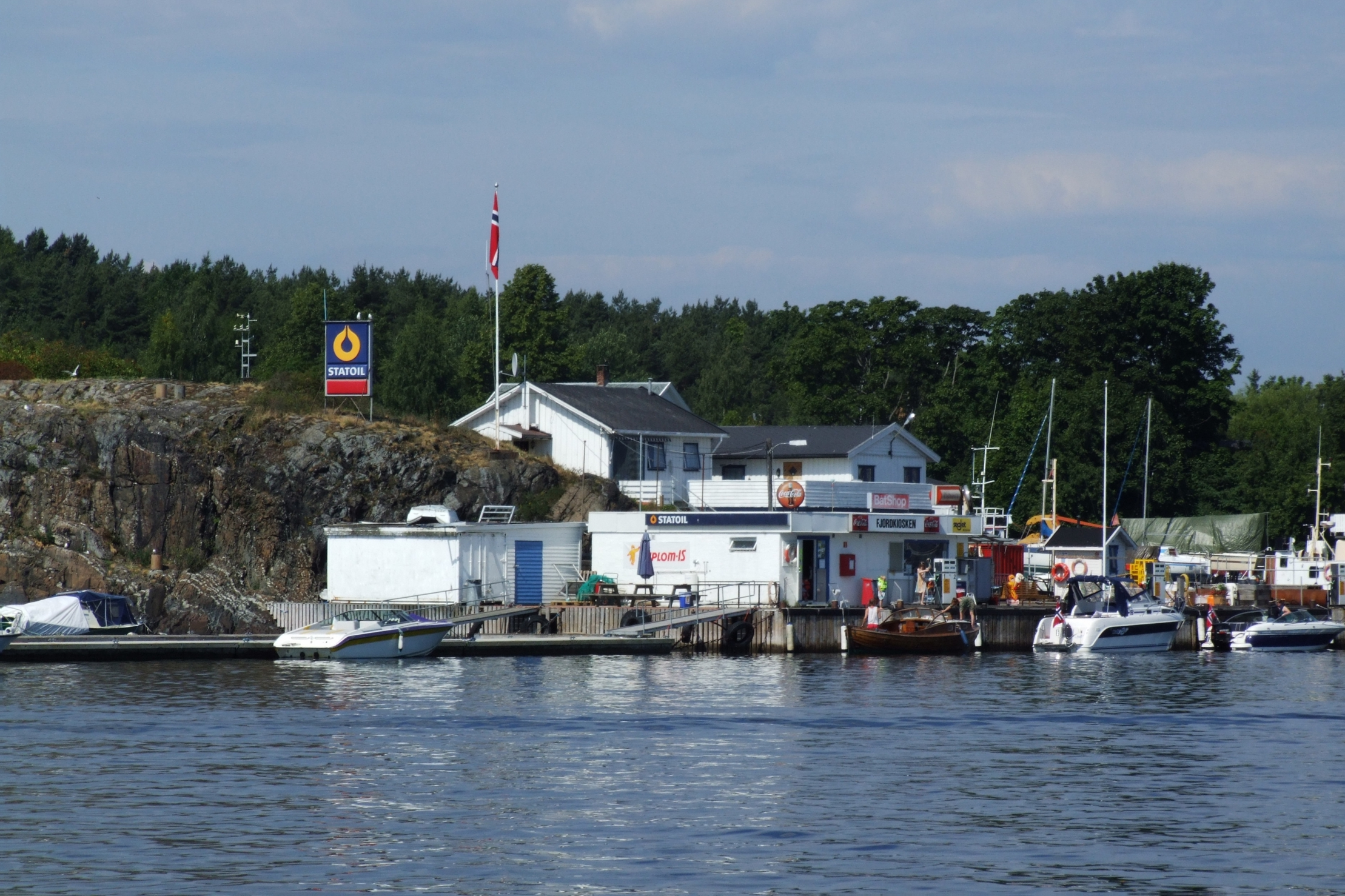
Small harbour on north side of Lindøya island, Oslo, Norway

The island is connected to Oslo by means of the B1 public transit ferry route which docks on the western side of the island, and the eastern side. Service is year-round although very limited during the winter season.

== The name ==
The first element is lind 'linden' (Tilia cordata), the last element is the finite form of øy 'island'.
