= Nakholmen =

Uninhabited island in the inner part of Oslofjord

Coordinates: 59°53′N 10°42′E

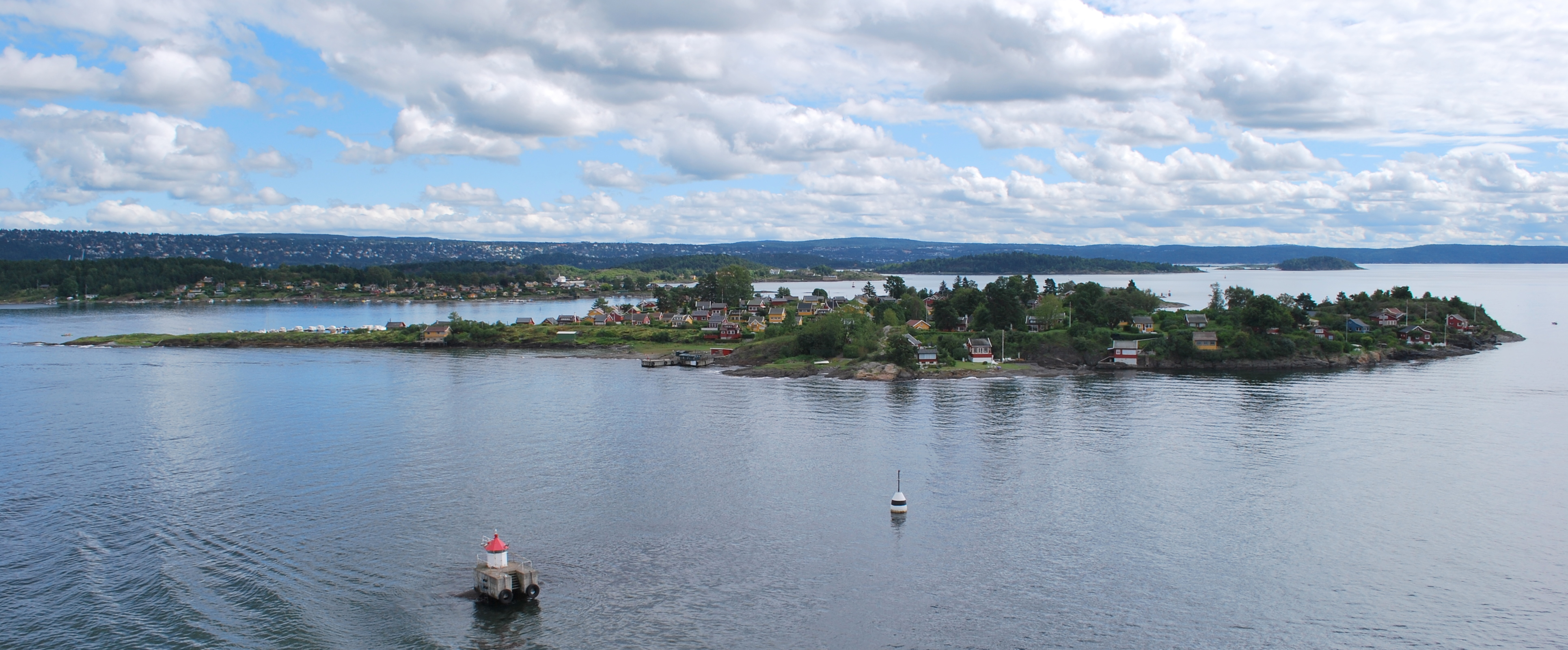
Nakholmen from the west.

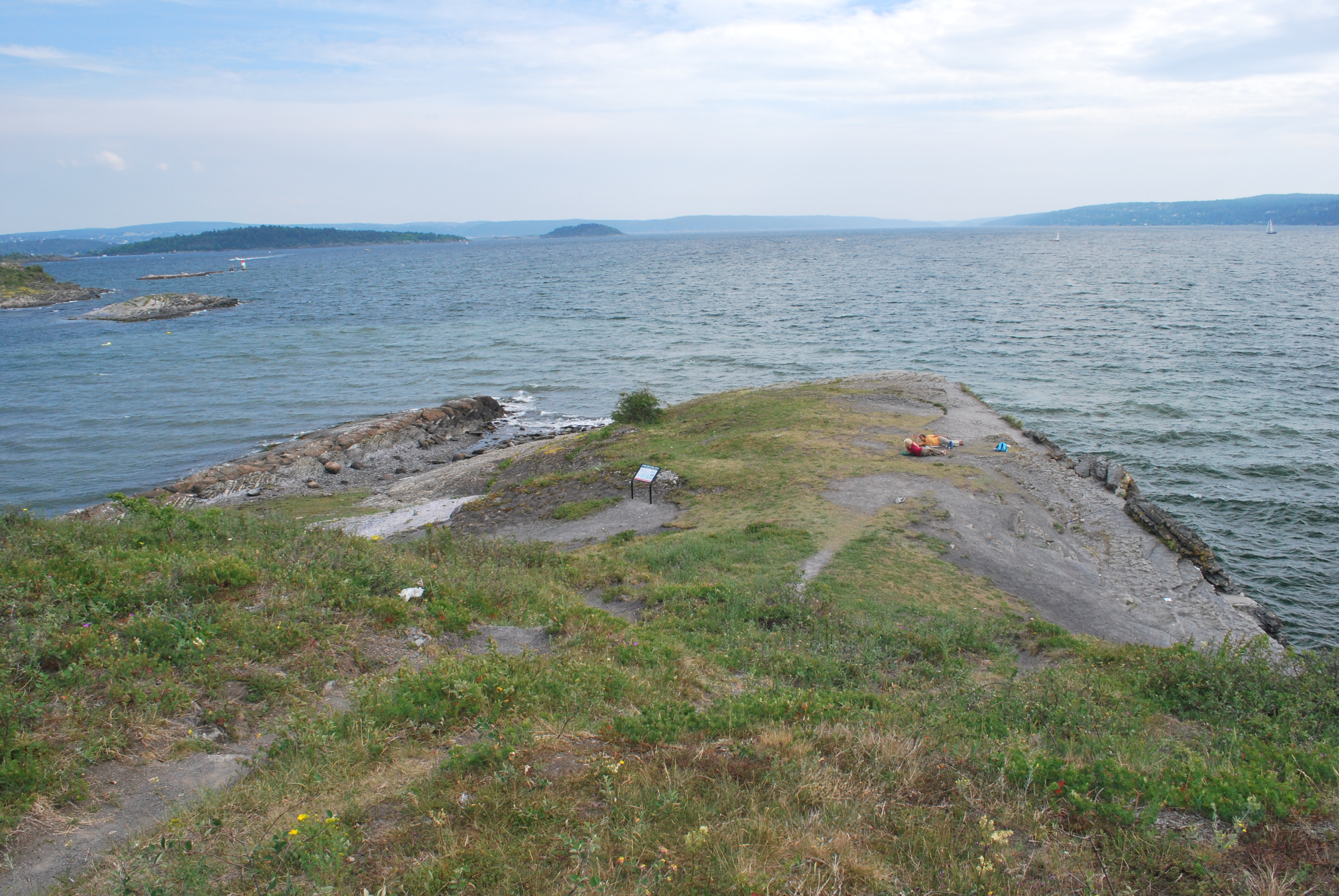
Roodden, southern part of Nakholmen.

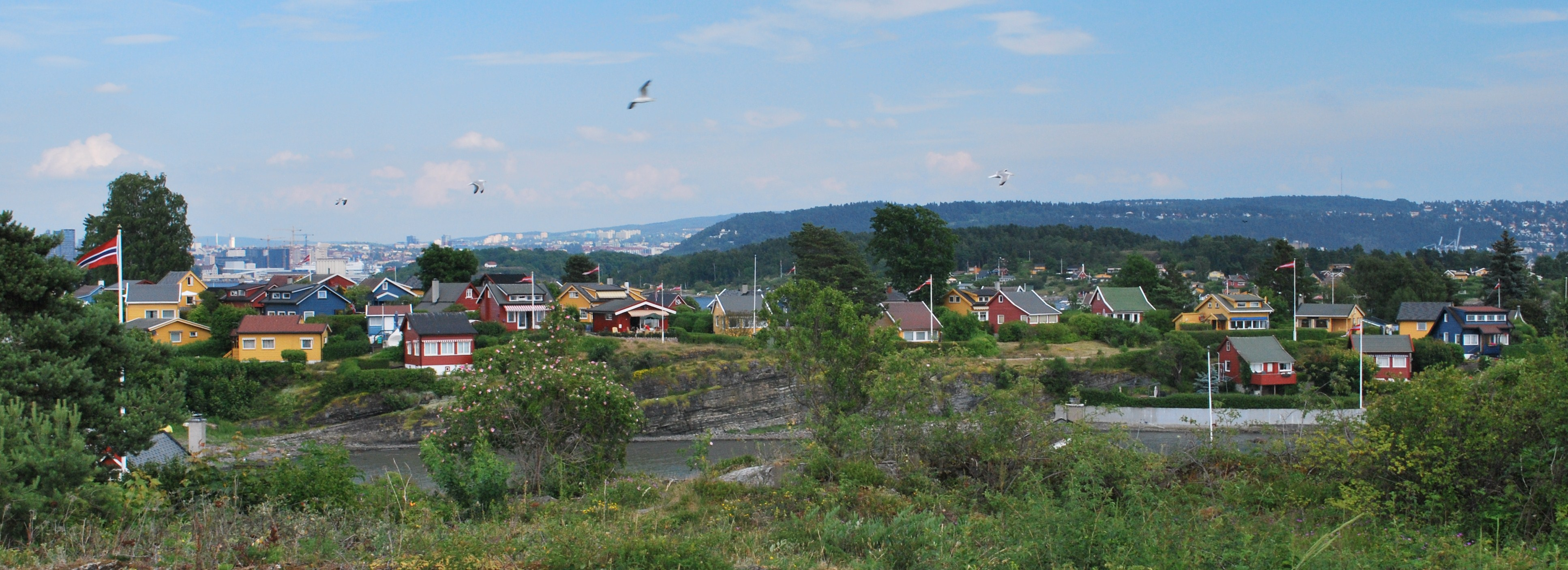
Cottages on Nakholmen.

Nakholmen (also spelled Nakkholmen) is an uninhabited island in the inner part of Oslofjord, in the municipitality of Oslo. It is located west of Lindøya and southeast of Bygdøy. The island has more than 180 weekend cottages.

== The name ==
The first element is nakke ('(nape of the) neck') - the last element is the finite form of holme ('islet'). The name is referring to a rock formation on the islet. (See also Hovedøya.)
