= Hovedøya Abbey =

Monastery on Hovedøya Island, Norway

Coordinates: 59.900°N 10.733°E

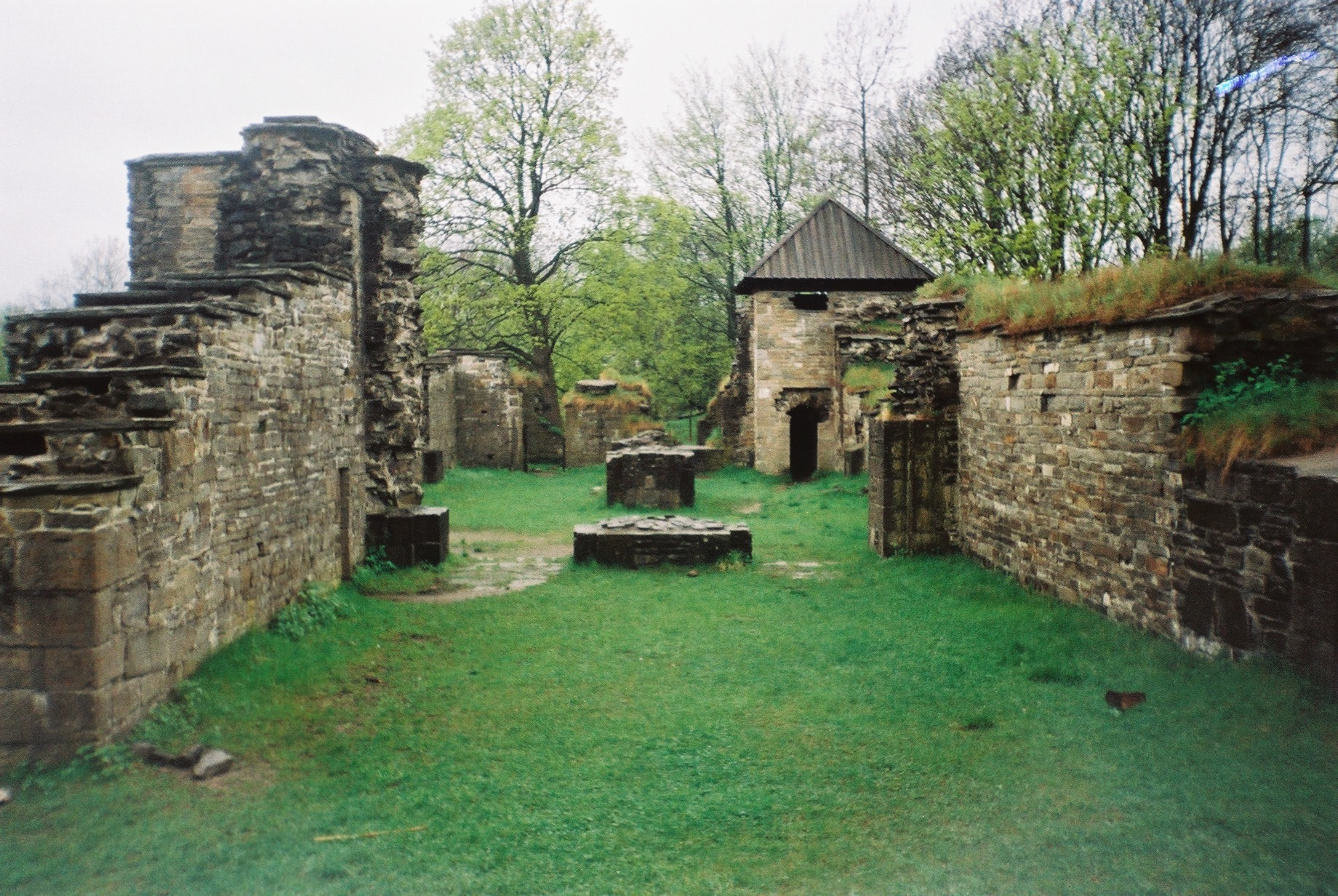
Hovedøya Abbey, Church of St. Edmund, seen from the choir.

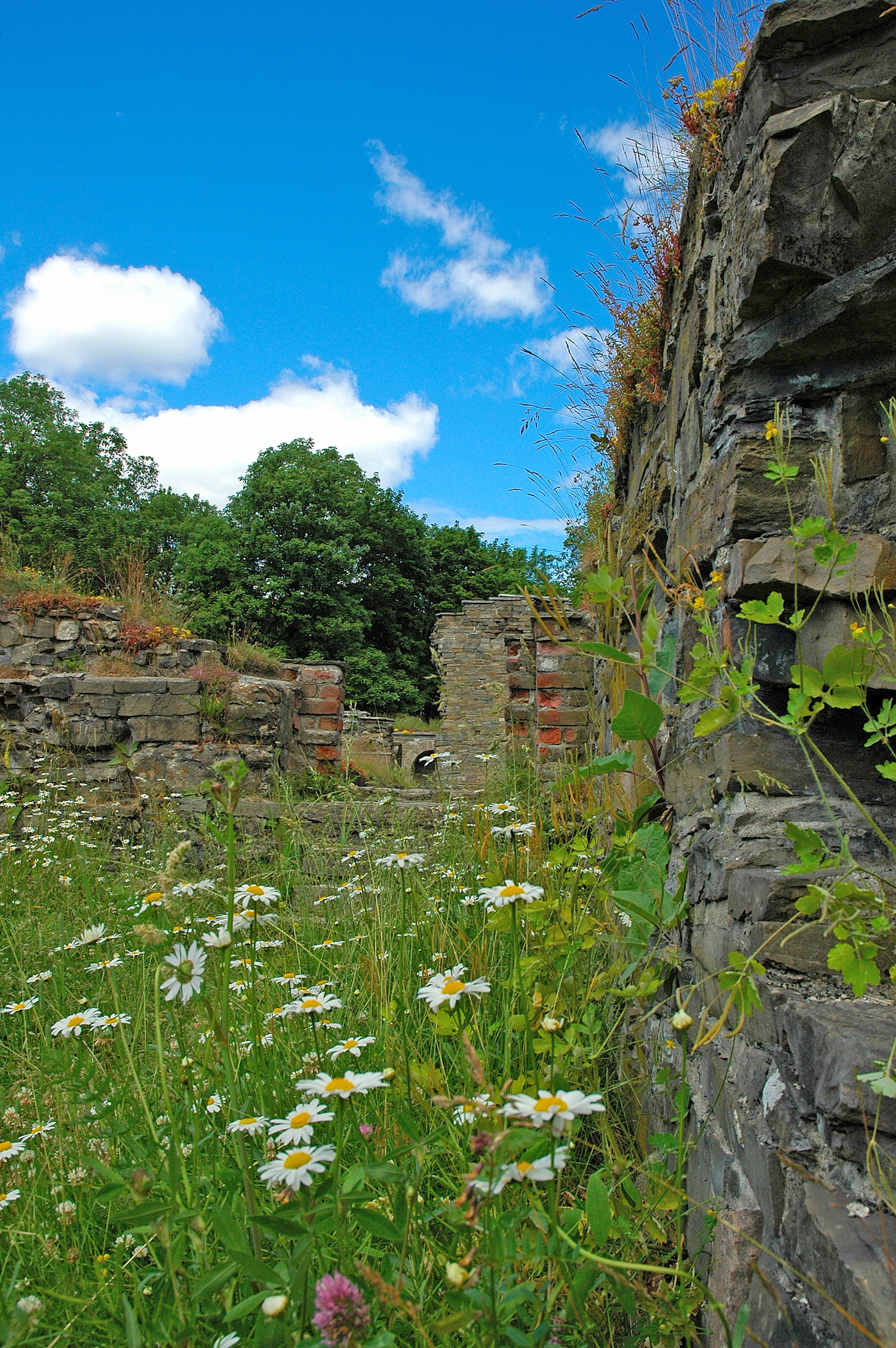
The ruins of Hovedøya Abbey, near Oslo

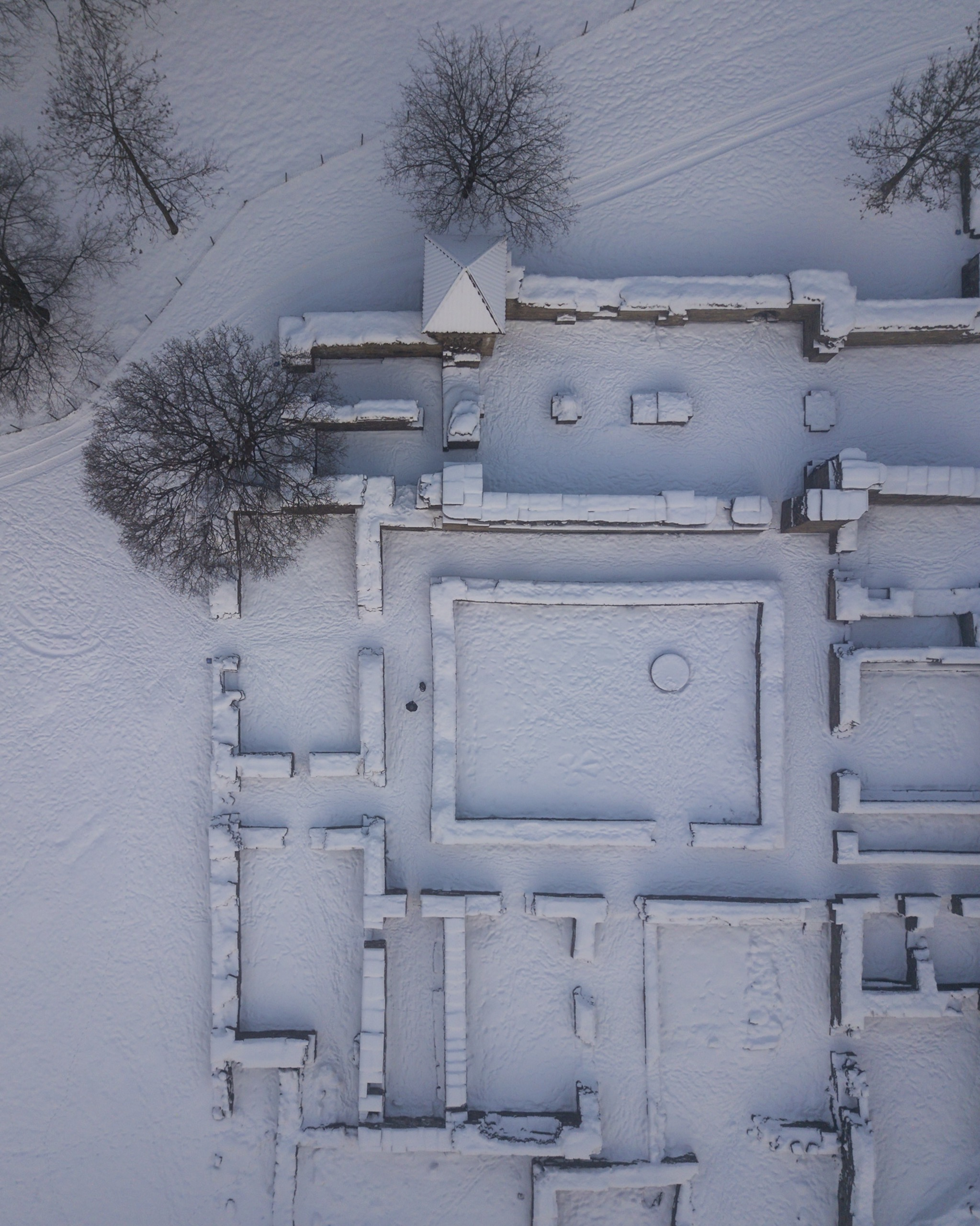
A view of the ruins of Hovedøya Abbey

Hovedøya Abbey (Hovedøya kloster) was a medieval era Cistercian monastery on the island of Hovedøya in Oslofjord outside of Oslo, Norway.

== History ==
The monastery was founded on 18 May 1147 by monks from Kirkstead Abbey in England on Hovedøya island, and dedicated to the Blessed Virgin Mary and Saint Edmund. A church dedicated to Edmund already stood on the island, and the monks took this over as the abbey church, modifying it to meet Cistercian requirements. The rest of the monastery follow a modified Cistercian building plan, to take into account a small local hill. The church itself is built in Romanesque style; the rest of the monastery was presumably Gothic. During the medieval period the abbey was one of the richest institutions in Norway, holding over 400 properties, including a fishery and timber yards.

== End of the abbey ==
Political turmoil during the succession to the throne of Denmark-Norway led to the end of the monastery. The abbot, having supported the former king Christian II, was imprisoned for supporting him in the hope of saving the catholic monasteries. He was imprisoned from January till July 1532. In the meantime Christian made two attempts to become king again by taking the Akershus fortress, but did not succeed. The monks who had fled joined Hans after he became priest in the church of St. Hallvard. The monastery had been burned at the beginning of April by a Danish rescue expedition.

Any hope the order might have had in restoring the rich abbey was dashed 4 years later, when the Reformation swept over Denmark-Norway.

The site was later used as a quarry for stone for Akershus Fortress. The remaining ruins are nevertheless among the most complete of a medieval Norwegian monastery. Between the years 1930–1938, architect Gerhard Fischer performed excavations on site.

== Other Sources ==
- Fischer, Gerhard (1974) Klosteret på Hovedøya : et Cistercienseranlegg (Oslo:Fortidsminneforeningen) ISBN 8290052049
