= Langøyene =

Island in Nesodden, Norway

Coordinates: 59°52′16″N 10°43′15″E

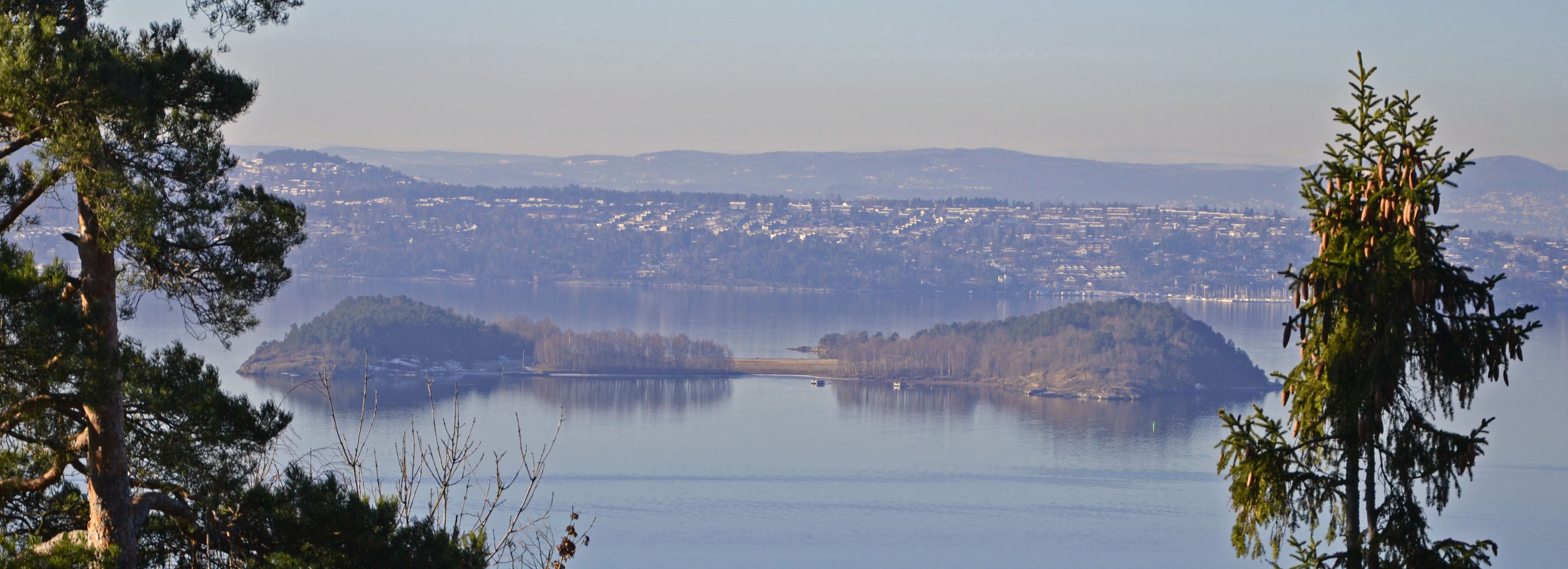
Langøyene, as seen from the hills of Ekeberg

Langøyene is an island in Bunnefjorden in the inner part of Oslofjord, in the municipitality of Nesodden in Akershus, Norway. It is owned by the municipality of Oslo. Langøyene were originally two islands, Nordre Langøy and Søndre Langøy. The islands were bought by the municipitality of Kristiania in 1902, and the strait between the two islands has been filled with garbage deposits.

== The name ==
The meaning of the name Langøyene is 'the [two] long islands'. Although today it is just one H-formed island.
