= Bleikøya =

Island in Oslo, Norway

Coordinates: 59°53′N 10°44′E

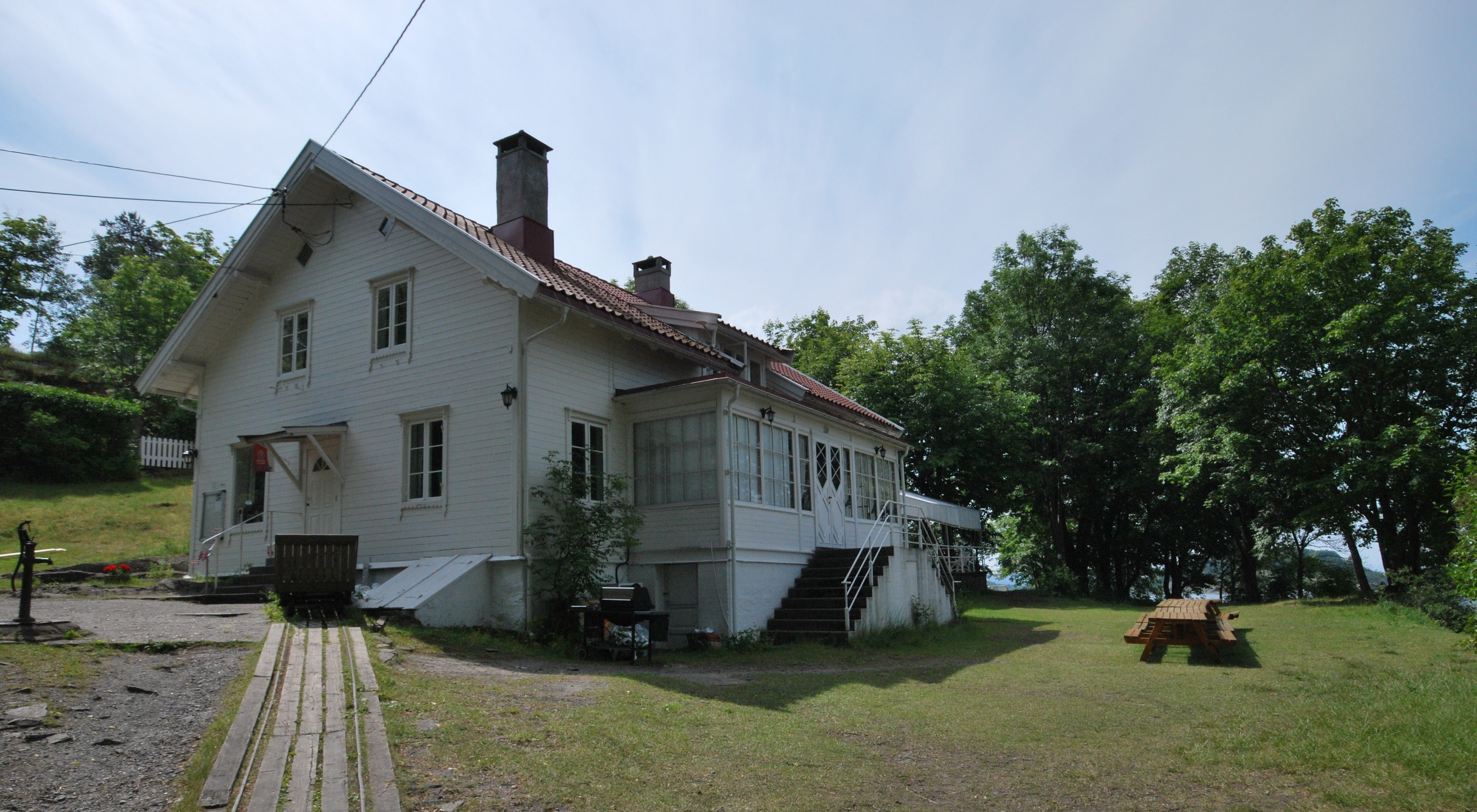
The former sanatorium building at Bleikøya

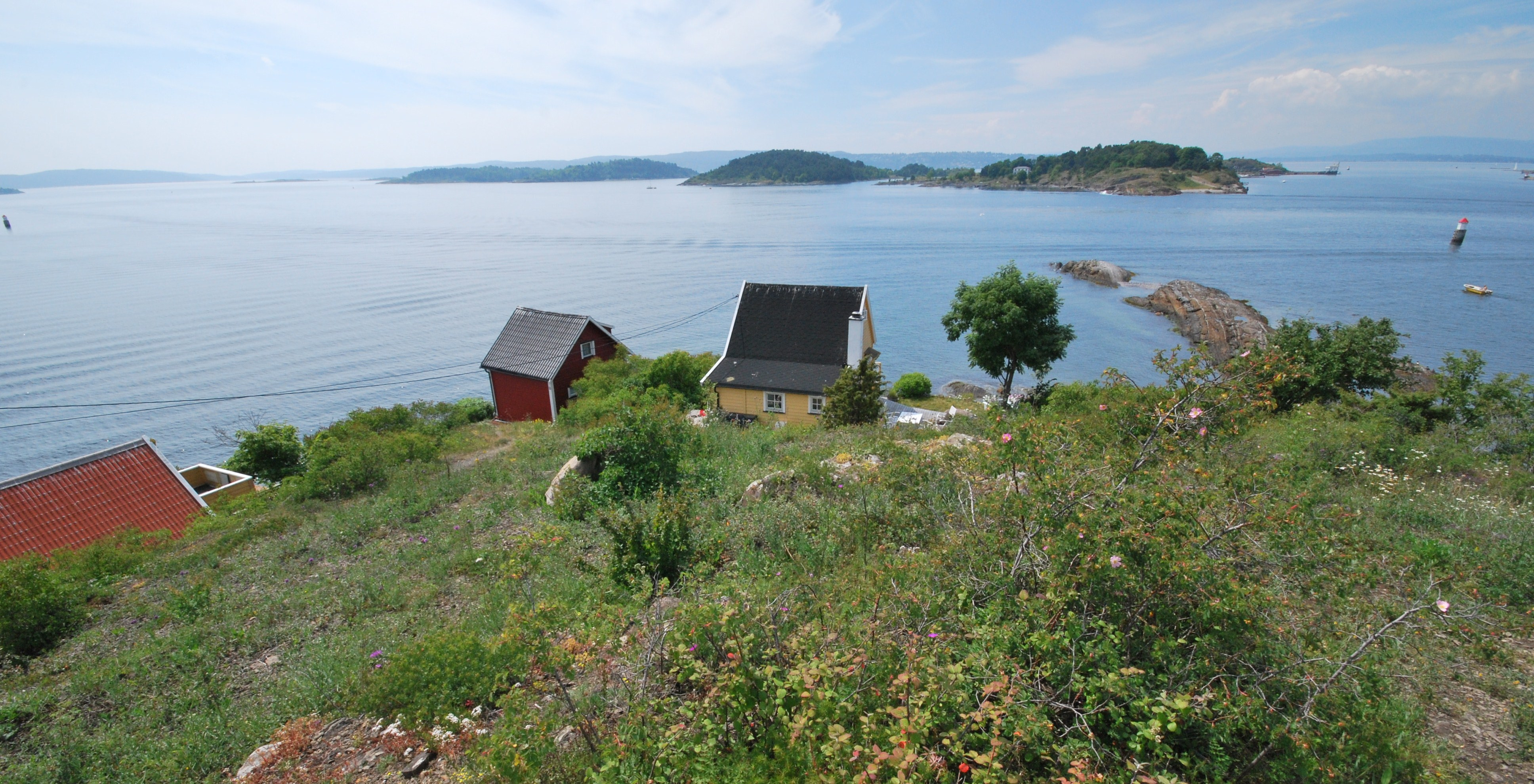
View from the southern part of Bleikøya

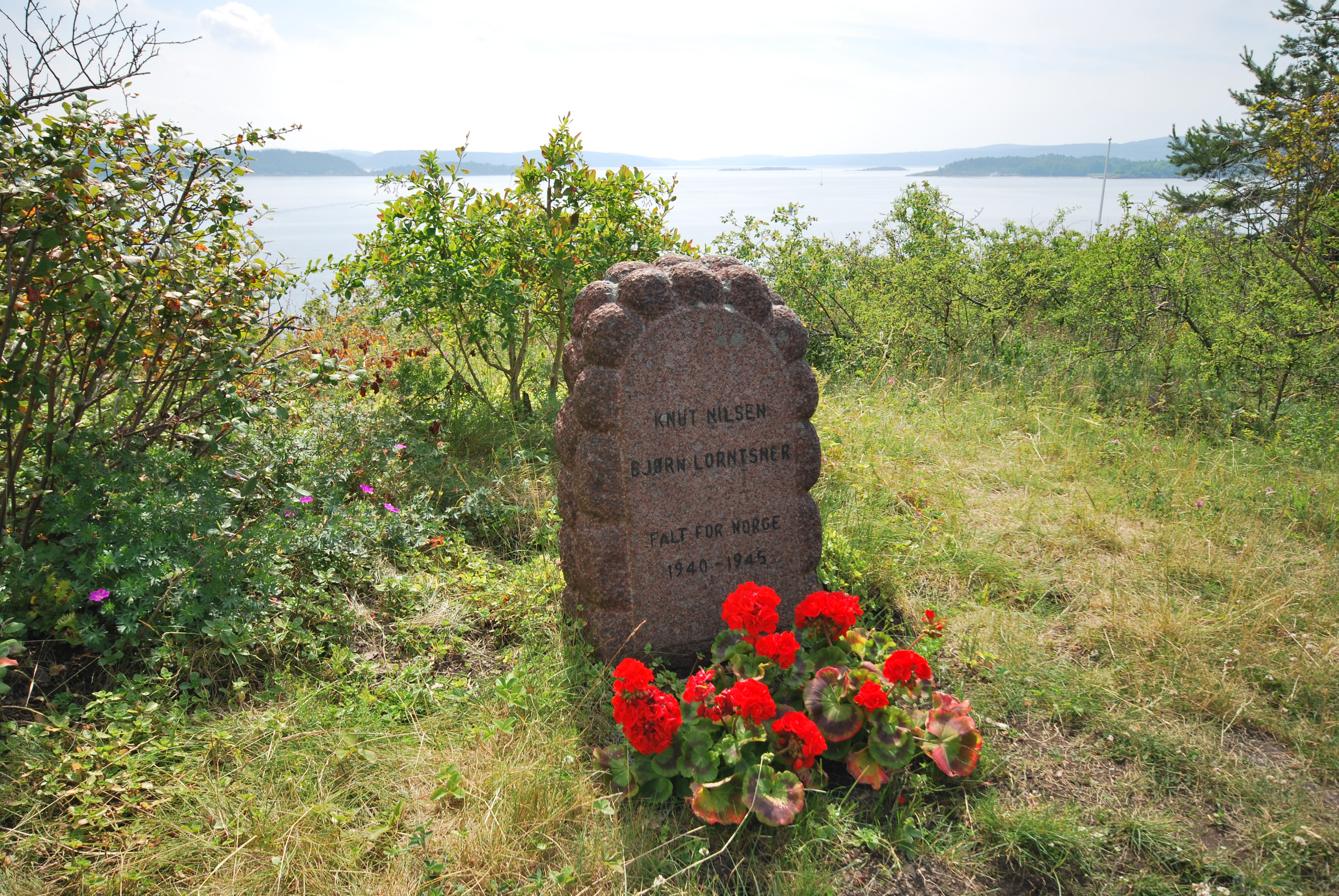
World War II memorial on Bleikøya

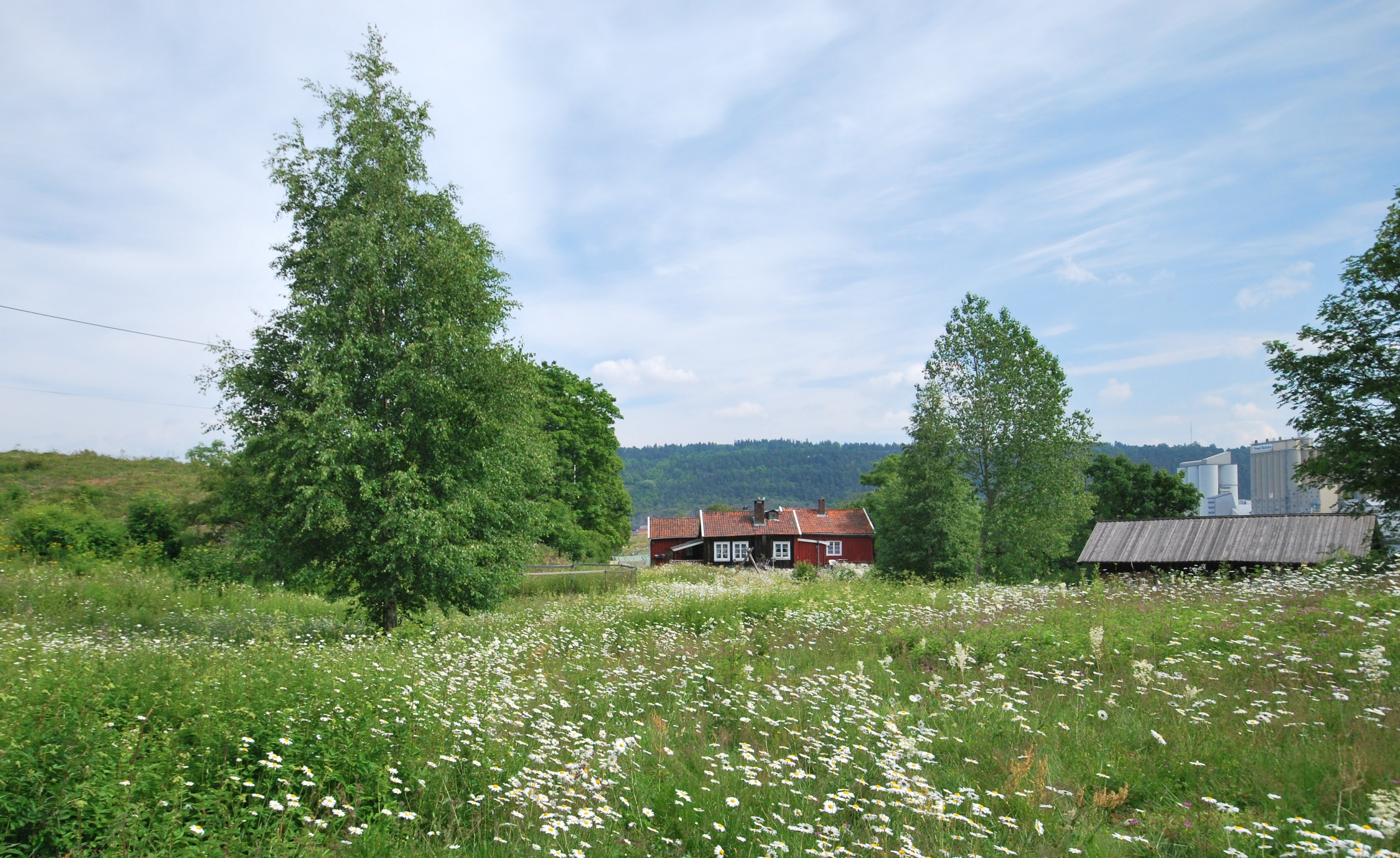
Farm on Bleikøya

Bleikøya is an island in the inner part of Oslofjord, in the municipitality of Oslo. It is located between Hovedøya and Sjursøya. From the late 19th century, a sanatorium for children suffering from scrofula was located on the island.

In 2008 the Bleikøya Nature Reserve was established on the northeastern part of Bleikøya, including the islet Bleikøykalven.

== The name ==
The først element is bleik ('pale') - the last element is the finite form of øy ('island'). The name is probably referring to the color of the rock of the island.
