= Hovedøya =

Island in Oslo, Norway

Coordinates: 59°54′N 10°44′E

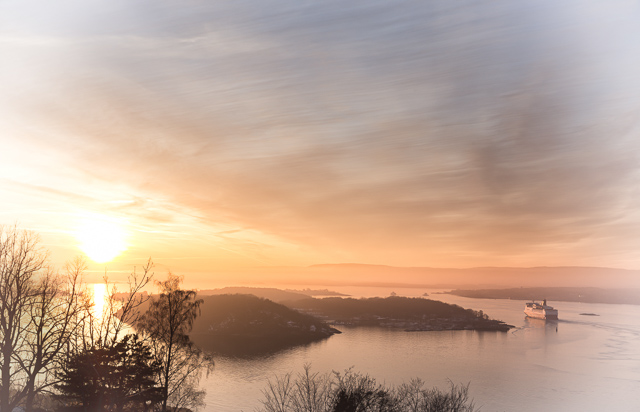
Hovedøya seen from the mainland in Oslo

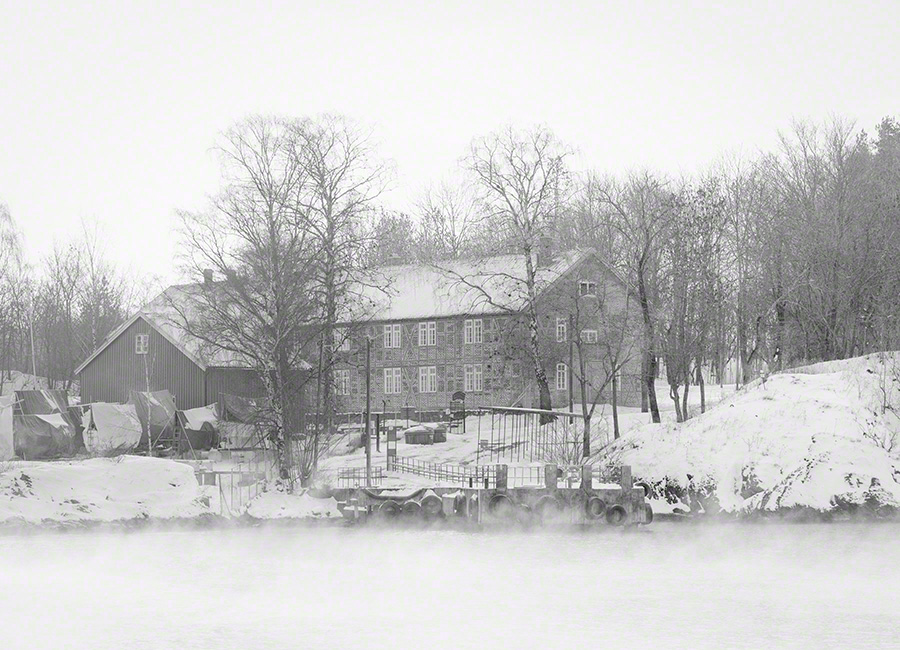
The old military storage facility on Hovedøya

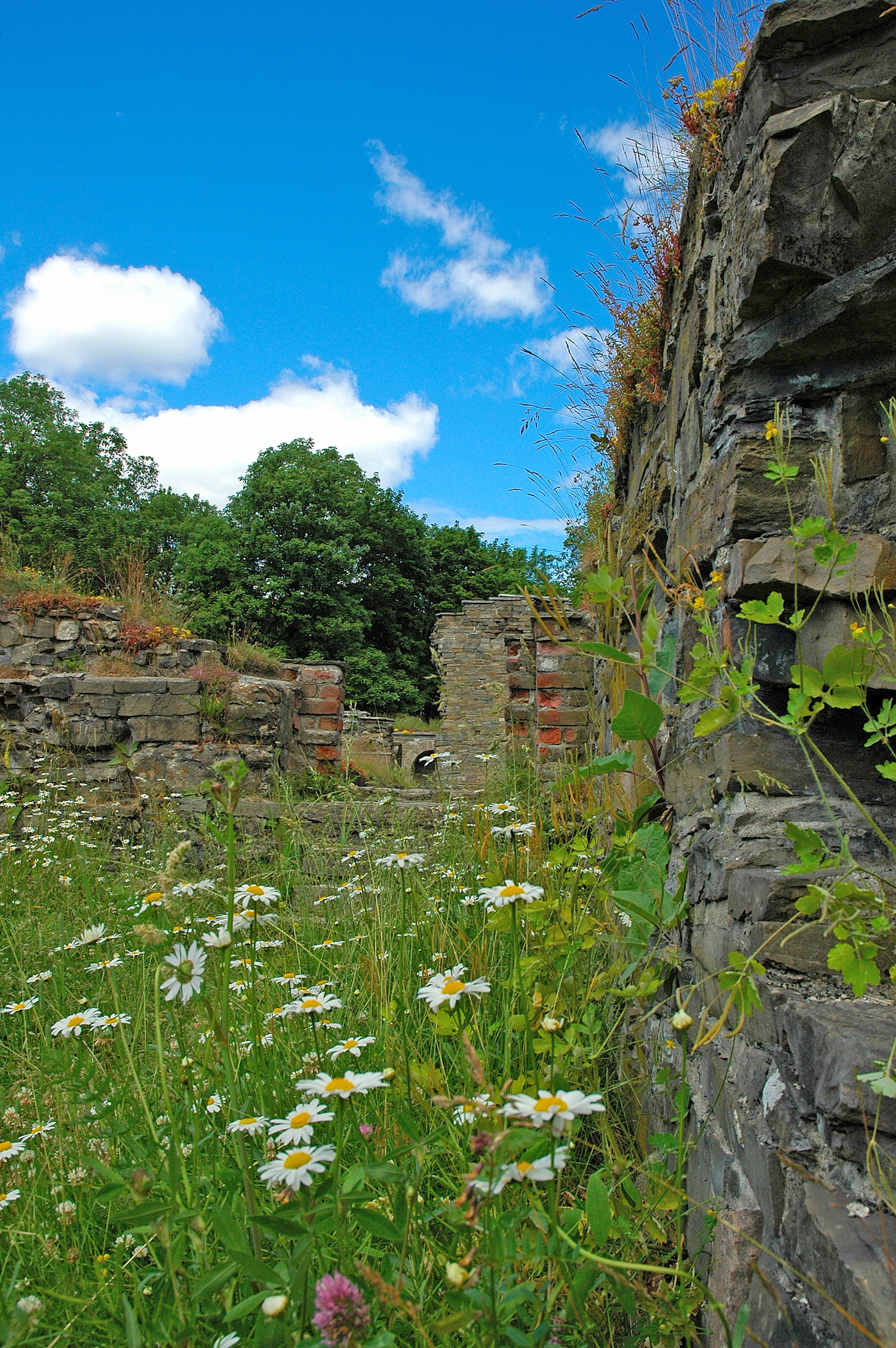
The ruins of the Cistercian monastery on Hovedøya, Oslo

Hovedøya is one of several small islands off the coast of Oslo, Norway in the Oslofjord. The island is quite small, no more than 800 metres across in any direction, the total area is 0.4 square kilometre. Its population is 5. It is well known for its lush and green nature, with a wide variety of trees, bushes and flowers. For many, many years there was a military base on the island.

== The name ==
The name is from Norse times (Hǫfudøy). The first element is hǫfud 'head' (here in the sense 'hill' or 'height'), the last element is the finite form of øy 'island'. The name is a reference to the top of the hill on the island - at 47 metres it is the tallest point of the inner Oslofjord islands by a good margin. (See also Nakholmen.)

== History ==
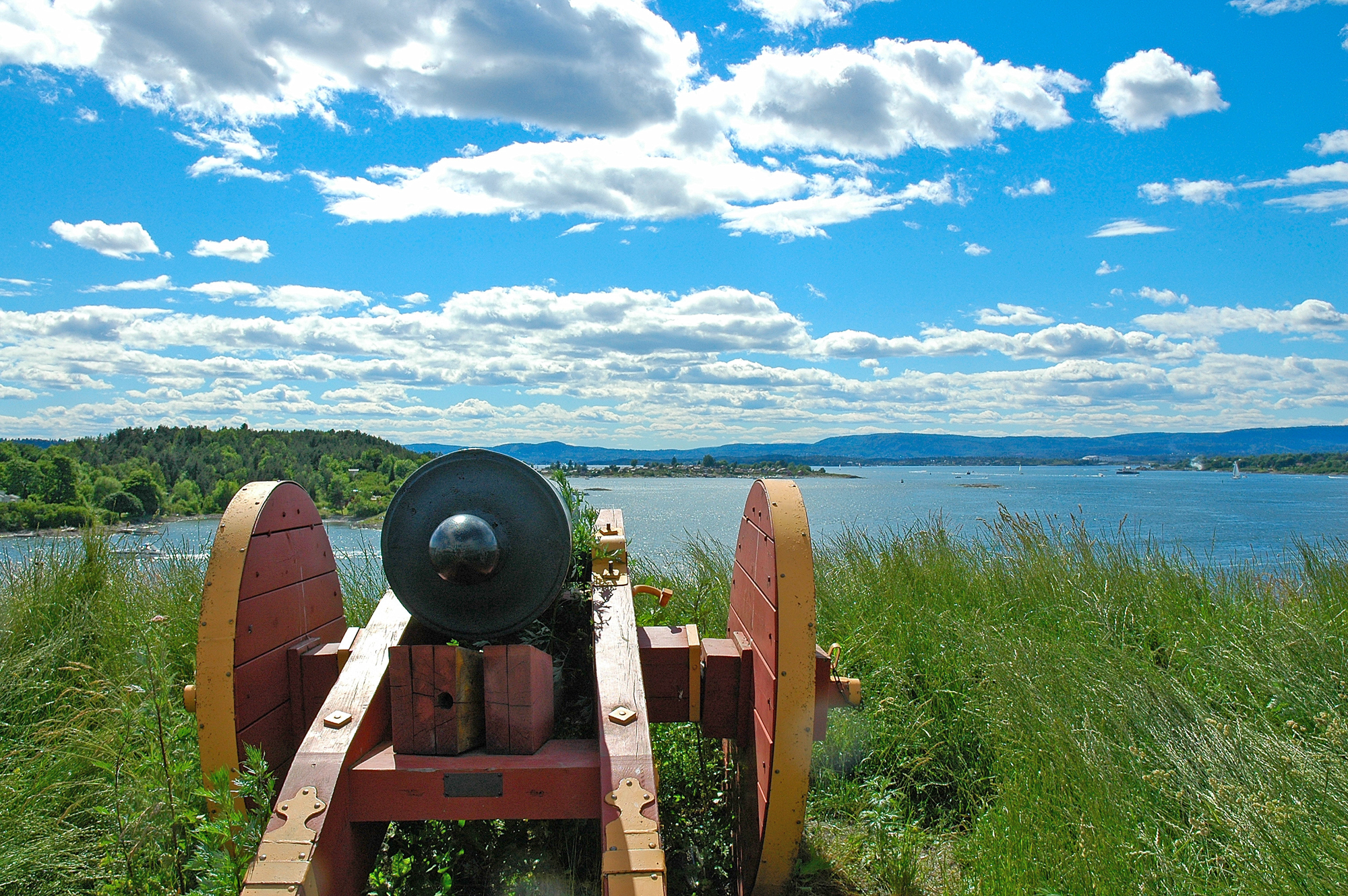
The Western cannon battery, sporting copies of early 19th-century cannons

The Cistercian monastery, Hovedøya Abbey, was built on the island, and opened on 18 May 1147. During the Medieval period, the monastery was a leading economical force in the Oslo region. It was, however, closed down before the Reformation after the abbot came into conflict with King Christian II. The military official at Akershus Fortress had the abbot imprisoned and the monastery looted and burned down in 1532. Parts of the ruins of the monastery remain on the island, but much of the stonework was used in the expansion of Akershus Fortress in the 17th century.

The island has also been used for military installations, and former military buildings and artillery remain on the island. When Denmark-Norway became involved in the Napoleonic Wars, two cannon batteries were built to defend Oslo and Akershus Fortress in 1808 (again using the monastery ruins as a quarry). Four depots for gunpowder were built in 1826 on the high points of the island to ward off intruders, and a fifth was built in 1867. On the eastern half of the island is a Victorian house, popularly known as the "Laboratory". It was used by Director of Armory Ole Herman Johannes Krag, co-inventor of the Krag–Jørgensen rifle in the late 19th century.

There was once a large German camp on the island, with several barracks, which would later be turned into National Internment Camp for Women in Hovedøya. Today, only a single barracks from the camp remains, located near the ruins of the monastery.

Today the island is a destination for tourists and bathers, who can enjoy the island's natural environment, pastures, historic buildings as well as fairly benign (for Norway) bathing temperatures.

== Natural history ==
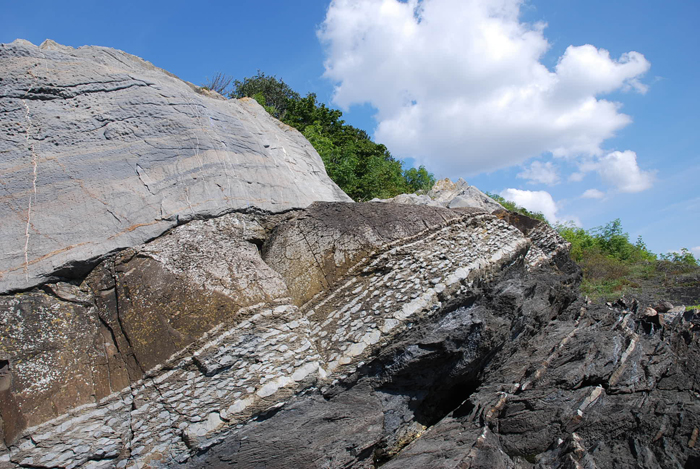
Border between the Ordovician and Silurian sediments, showing the marked difference from the late Ordovician brownish mudstone with calcareous nodules of the Langøyene Formation and black Silurian deep water shale of the Solvik Formation. The layers have been inverted by the effects of folding and thrusting during the Caledonian orogeny.

The island has an interesting geology, being composed mainly of Ordovician and some Silurian mudstone and limestone. The transition between rocks of the two periods is exposed on the south-eastern tip of the island, illustrating the sudden marine transgression that marks the shift between two important parts of Earths history. The sequence has been affected by both folding and thrusting as part of the Caledonian orogeny with the strata lying vertically or in some case becoming overturned.

The island is cross-cut by diabase dikes associated with a major rift in the Oslo area in the Permian. The diabase has been heavily quarried for building material, and the island has about 20 quarries dating from the medieval period through to the 19th century. The oldest rock on the island dates back to late Ordovician and the eastern parts is littered with erratic boulders deposited during the last ice Age, thus the island illustrates well the local geological events spanning nearly half a billion years.

The mostly sedimentary geology has given the island a very fertile soil, giving it Norway's highest biodiversity found in such a small place. A few plant species found on the island do not occur anywhere else in Norway.

Due to the geology and natural diversity, the island has been declared a natural preserve. While no part of the island is off limit to the public, collecting plants and taking rock-samples is banned.

== Visiting Hovedøya ==
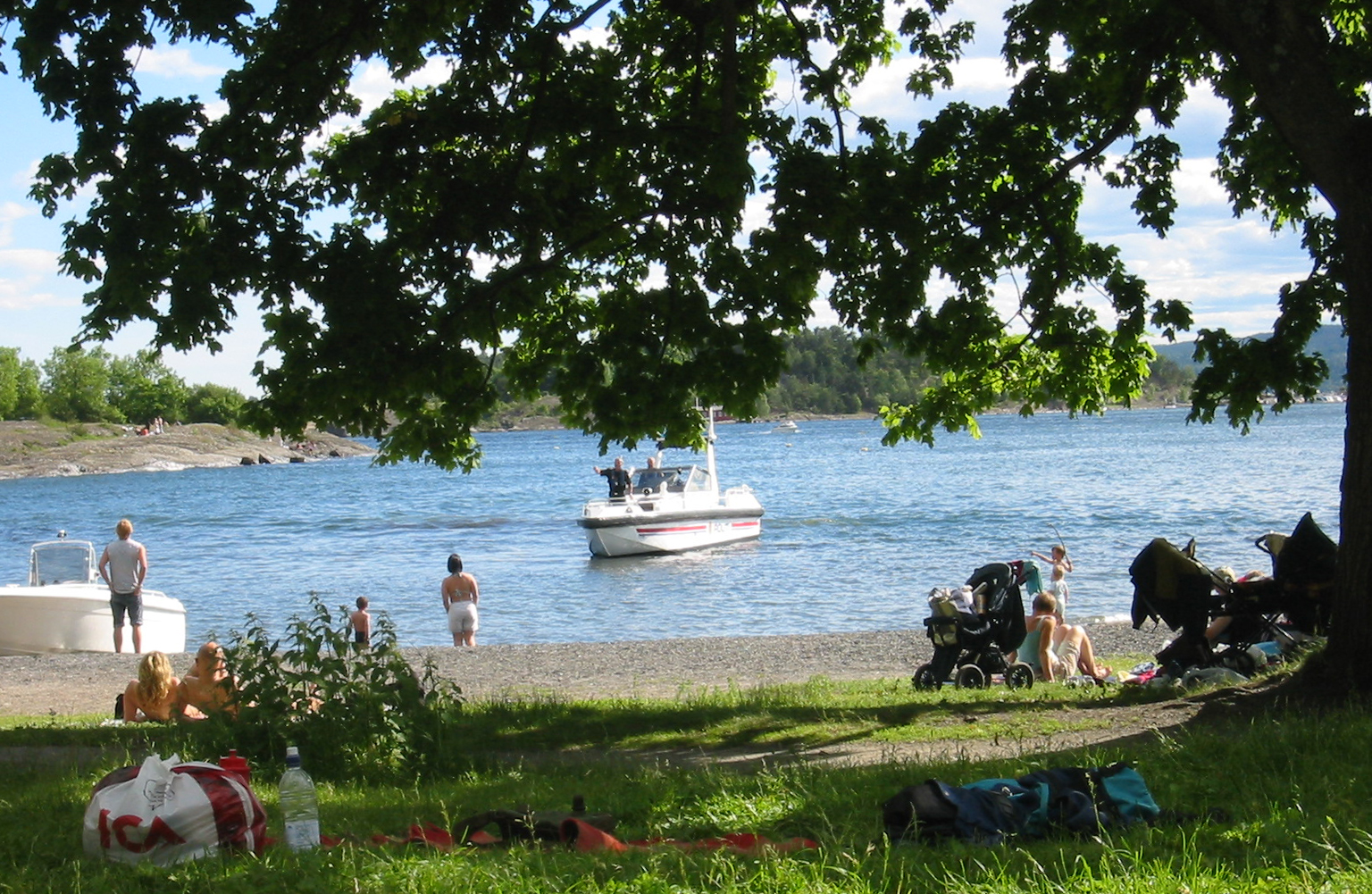
Hovedøya is a popular destination in summer

The island is connected to Oslo by means of two boat routes (lines B1 and B4) which dock on the north side of the island. Service is year-round although it's only running during daylight and therefore is limited during the winter season. In summer time a small cafeteria right by the monastery ruins is open to the general public.

== Curiosities ==
There is a fox living on the island that is often photographed by internet users and is known to occasionally steal things.
