= Oslofjord =

Inlet in southeast Norway

- Oslofjorden
- Map of the inlet
- Interactive map of the fjord
- Location: Southeast Norway
- Coordinates: 59.80229°N 10.55237°E
- Type: Rift valley
- Primary outflows: Skagerrak
- Basin countries: Norway
- Max. length: 120 kilometres (75 mi)
- Settlements: Oslo

The Oslofjord (Norwegian: Oslofjorden, Urban East Norwegian: [ˈʊ̂ʂlʊˌfjuːɳ]; English: Oslo Fjord) is an inlet in southeastern Norway. The 120-kilometre (75 mi) fjord begins at the small village of Bonn in Frogn Municipality and stretches northwards to the city of Oslo, and then curves to the east and then south. It then flows south to an imaginary line running between the Torbjørnskjær Lighthouse and Færder Lighthouse where it becomes part of the Skagerrak strait. The Skagerrak connects the North Sea and the Kattegat sea area, which leads to the Baltic Sea. The Oslofjord is not a fjord in the geological sense, but in the Norwegian language, the term fjord can refer to a wide range of waterways including inlets such as this one.

The bay is divided into the inner (indre) and outer (ytre) Oslofjord, separated by the 17 km (11 mi) long by 1 km (0.62 mi) wide Drøbak Sound. The innermost part is known as Bunnefjorden.

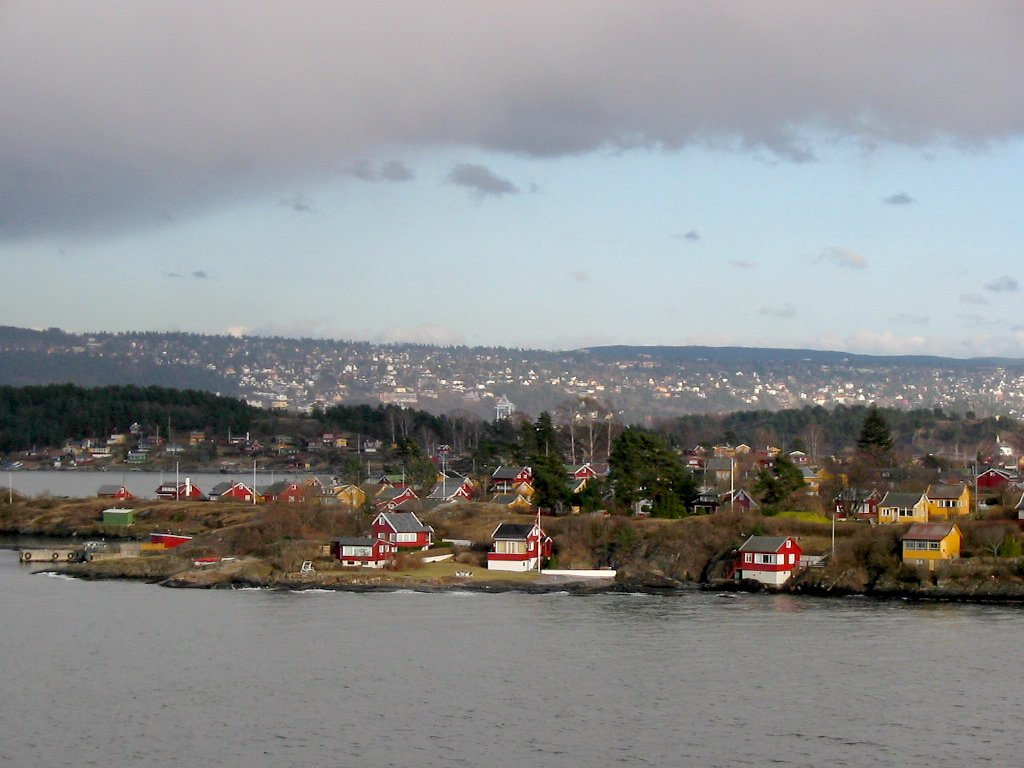
Summer houses in the Oslofjord

== Fjord ==
From 1624 until 1925 the name of the fjord was Christianiafjorden (or Kristianiafjorden), since Christiania was the name of the capital during this period (the Ch was changed to a K in 1877). Before that time, the Old Norse name of the fjord was Fold. The old name Fold led to the names of the counties of Vestfold ('the district west of Fold') and Østfold ('the district east of Fold') as well as the nearby district of Follo.

== Geography ==
Each of the islands in the innermost part of the fjord has its own identity and distinguishing history. Among them are Hovedøya, Lindøya, Nakholmen, Bleikøya, Gressholmen, and Langøyene. These islands can be reached with the Oslo boats from Aker Brygge. Hovedøya is known for containing monastery ruins, Gressholmen for its rabbits, Nakholmen, Bleikøya, Lindøya for their cosy cabins at the water's edge, and finally Langøyene for its camping possibilities and beach.

The inner part of the Oslofjord has steep and forest covered hill slopes down towards the fjord.

=== Climate ===
Satellite image by Sentinel-2

The Oslofjord has Norway's highest all year temperature: 7.5 °C (45.5 °F). February is the coldest month in the fjord with −1.3 °C (29.7 °F), while July normally reaches 17.2 °C (63.0 °F). The islands in the middle of the fjord are among Norway's warmest with high summer temperatures and moderate winters. The Oslofjord's relatively high temperatures enable various flora to flourish.

== History ==
The oldest settlements in the area surrounding the Oslofjord date from the Stone Age and the Bronze Age. It was here on the eastern and western shores that three of the best preserved Viking ships were unearthed, including the Gokstad ship. In historical times, this bay was known by the current name of the region, Viken ('the bay').

Oslofjord has been an important body of water strategically due to its proximity to the capital city of Oslo. During World War II, there were German installations at several points on its coastline. One installation in Hovedøya held 1,100 Wehrmacht soldiers and later women deemed Nazi collaborators at the National Internment Camp for Women in Hovedøya.

Norwegian painter Edvard Munch had a cottage and studio in Åsgårdstrand on the fjord and the Oslofjord appears in several of his paintings, including The Scream and Girls on the Pier.

=== Second World War ===
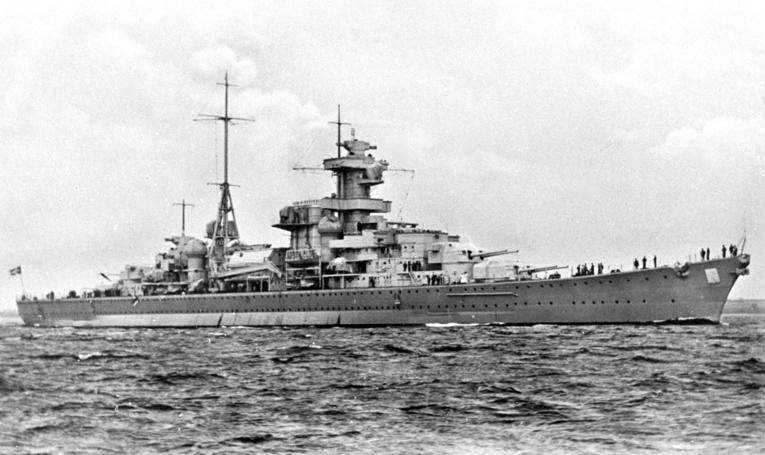
German cruiser Blücher

The fjord was the scene of a key event in the German invasion of Norway in April 1940, the Battle of Drøbak Sound. The invasion plan envisaged landing of 1,000 troops transported by ship to Oslo. Colonel Eriksen, Commander of the Oscarsborg fortress near Drøbak, mainly maintained for historical purposes, sank the German heavy cruiser Blücher in the Drøbak narrows.

The fortress's resistance blocked the route to Oslo, thus delaying the rest of the invading group long enough for the Norwegian royal family, government, parliament, and national treasury to evacuate. Thus Norway never surrendered to the Germans, leaving the Quisling government illegitimate and permitting Norway to participate as an ally in the war, rather than as a conquered nation.

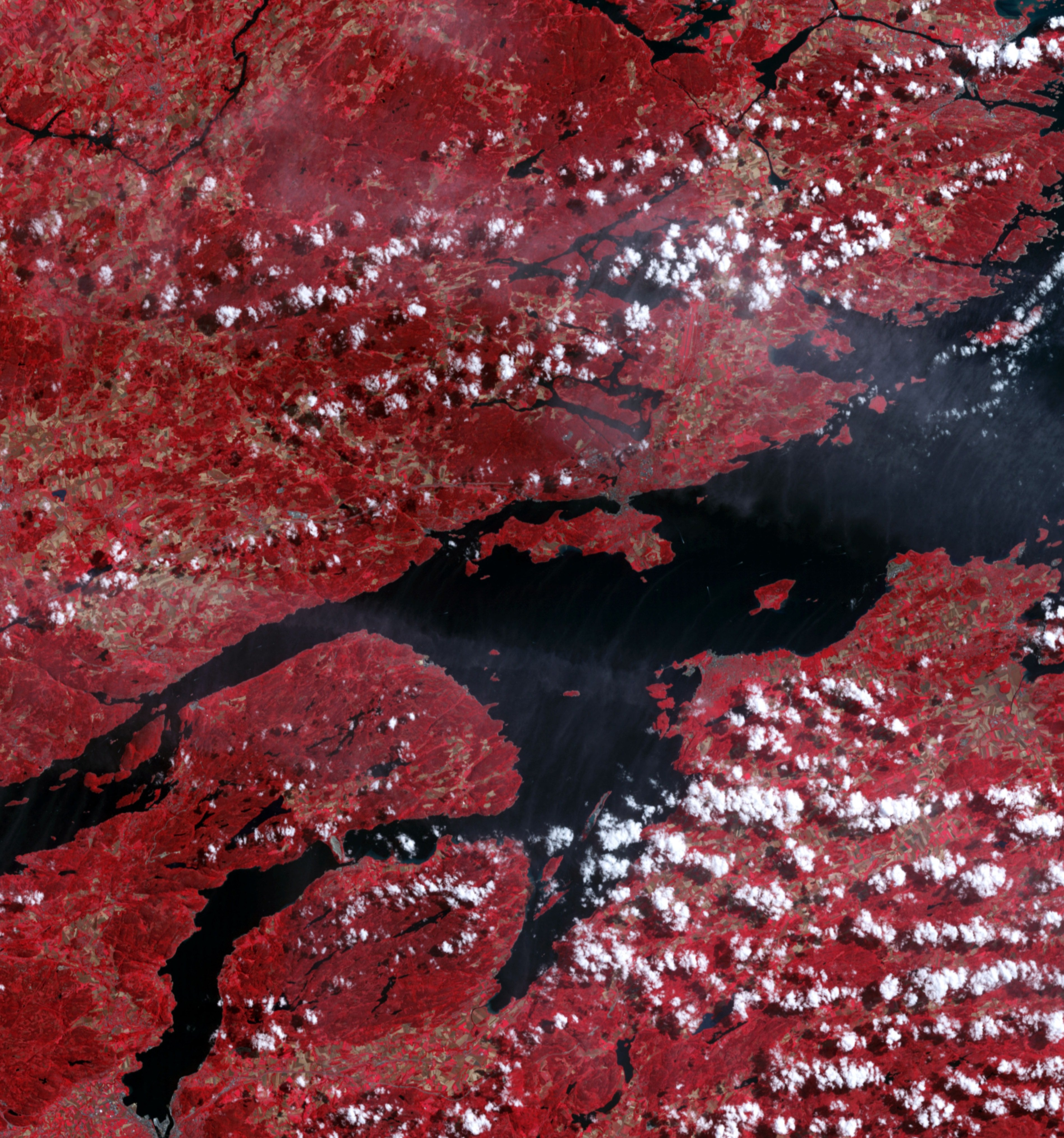
False-colour image of middle parts of Oslofjorden. North is to the left

== Demographics ==
The entire population situated around the Oslofjord including Oslo is about 1.96 million, and the total population of all the counties situated around the fjord is approximately 2.2 million.

More than 40% of Norway's population resides under 45 minutes of driving from the Oslofjord. The Oslofjord has Norway's busiest traffic of ferries and cargo boats.

Although the Oslofjord contains hundreds of populated islands, most of the population of the fjord resides on the mainland.

== Recreation ==
In the summer there are boats of all sizes on the fjord, and it is possible to go kayaking, canoeing, fishing, and sailing.

The Oslofjord is one of the nine venues of the Class 1 World Powerboat Championship.

== Media gallery ==
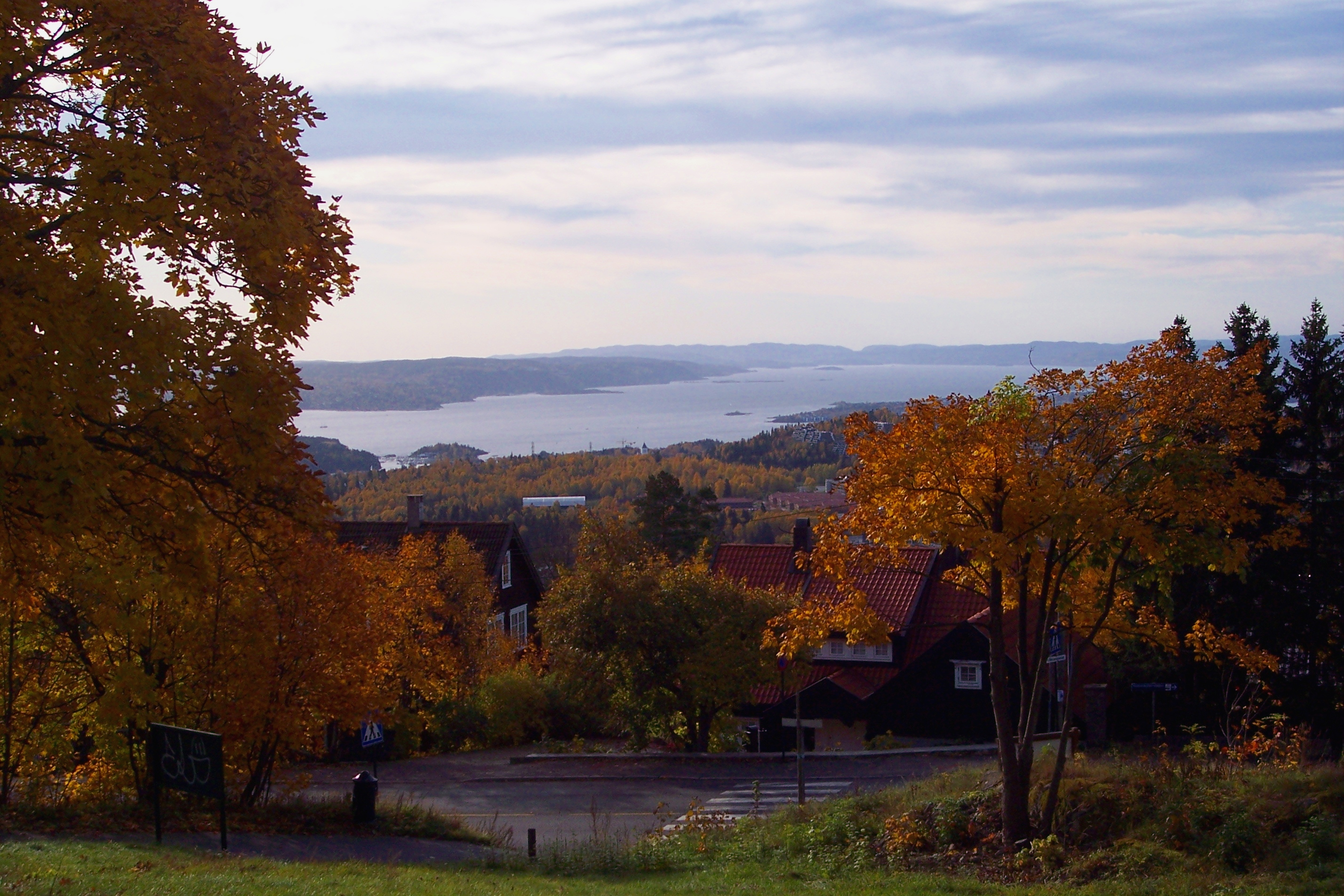
Oslofjord seen from Holmenkollen.

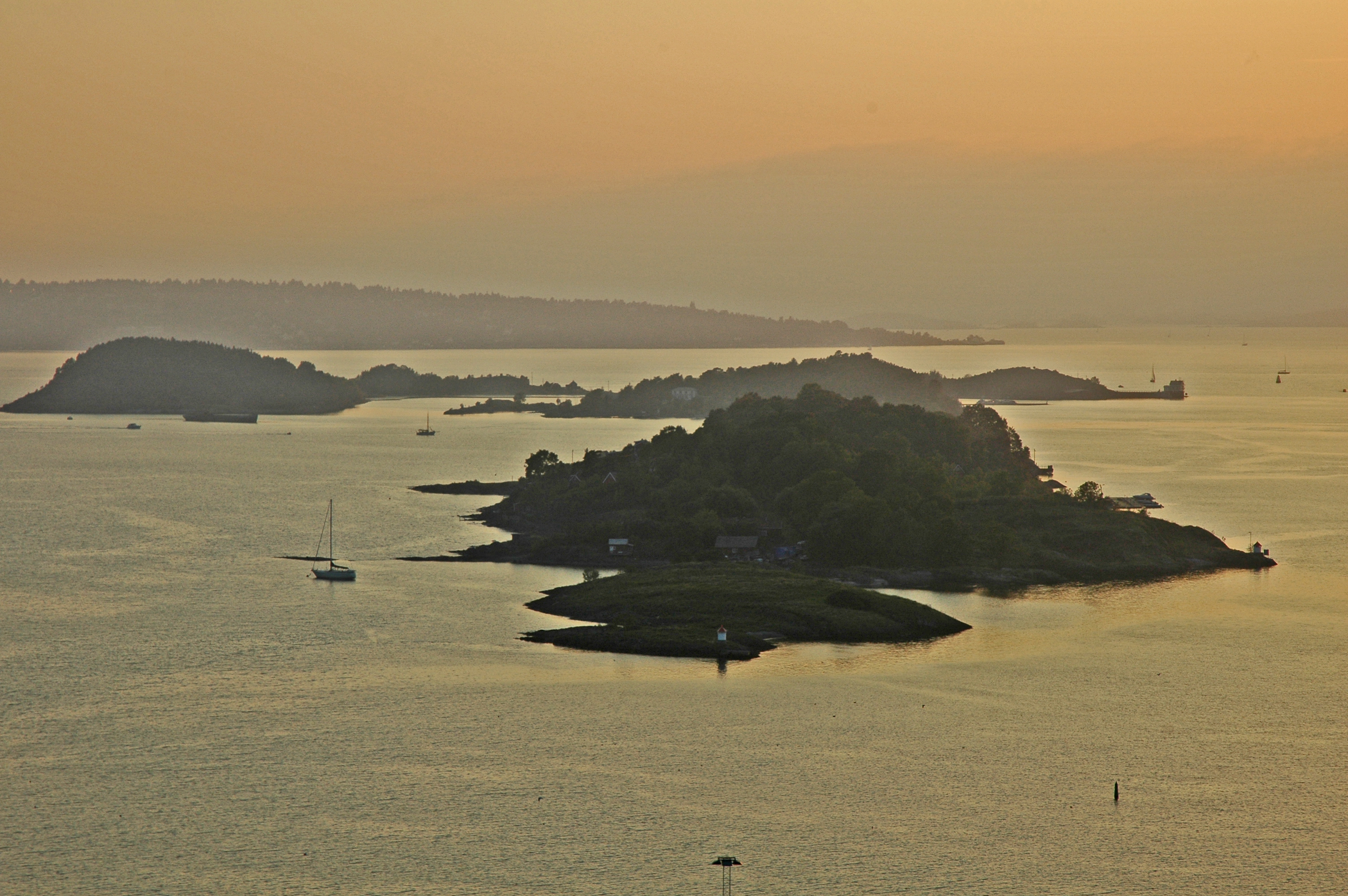
Oslofjord seen from Ekeberg, in Oslo.

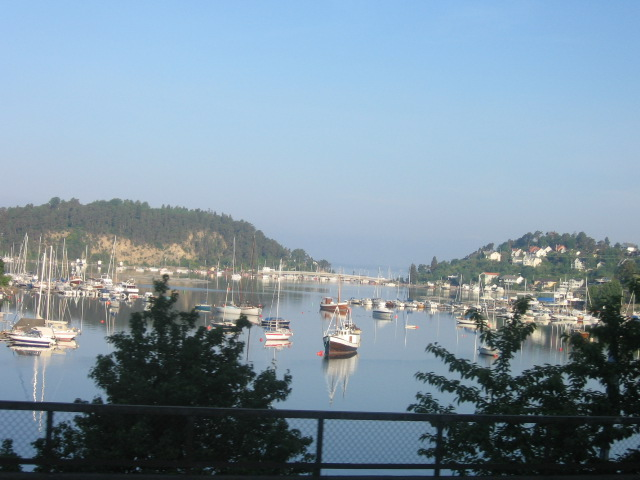
Boats in the fjord mid-2006.

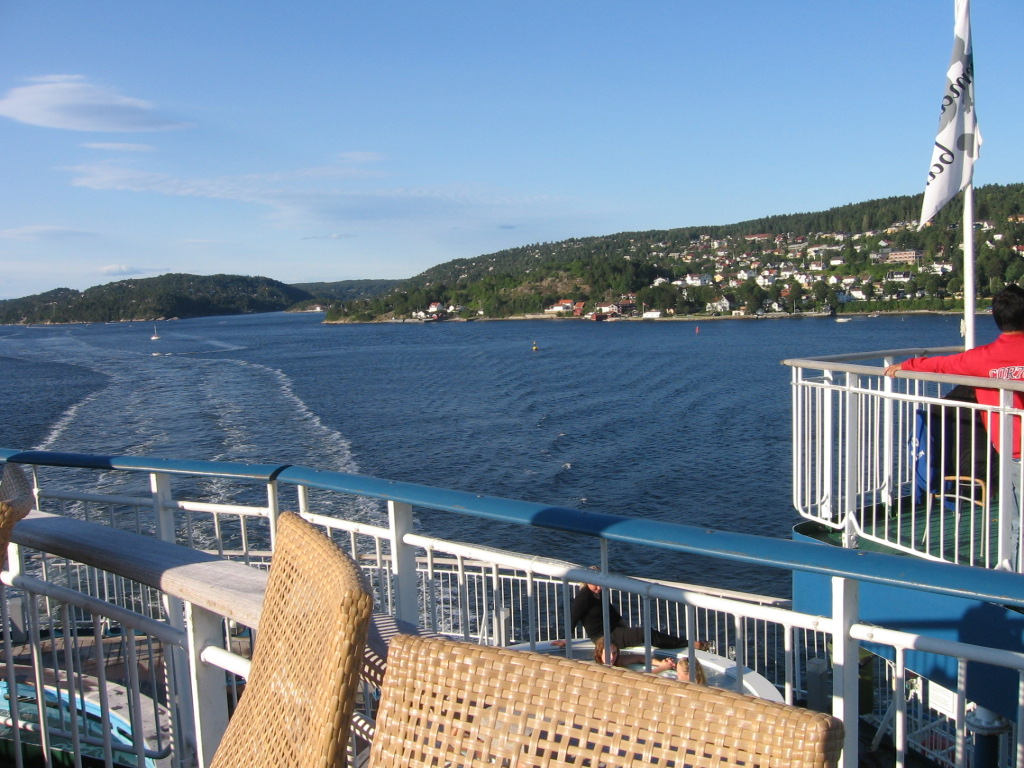
Oslofjord from Oslo-Copenhagen ferry.
