= Kåre Jonsborg =

Norwegian painter and textile artist (1912–1977)

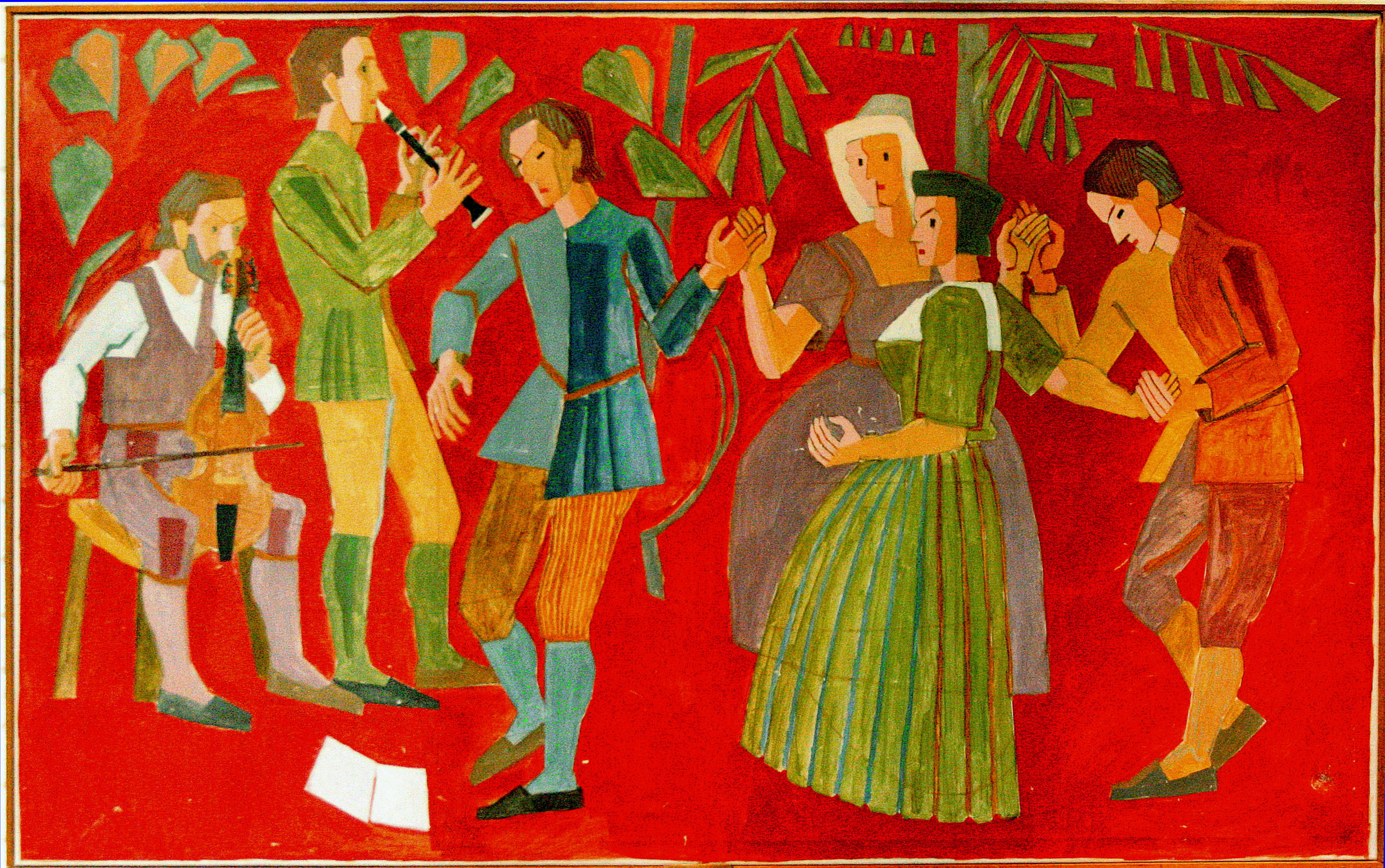
Design for tapestry "Sommerdans" ("Summer Dance") - This picture represented Norway in a series of postcards showing work of one selected artist from each European country, published by UNICEF United Nations Children's Fund just before 1980. The design is displayed in Voksenåsen Hotel, Oslo.

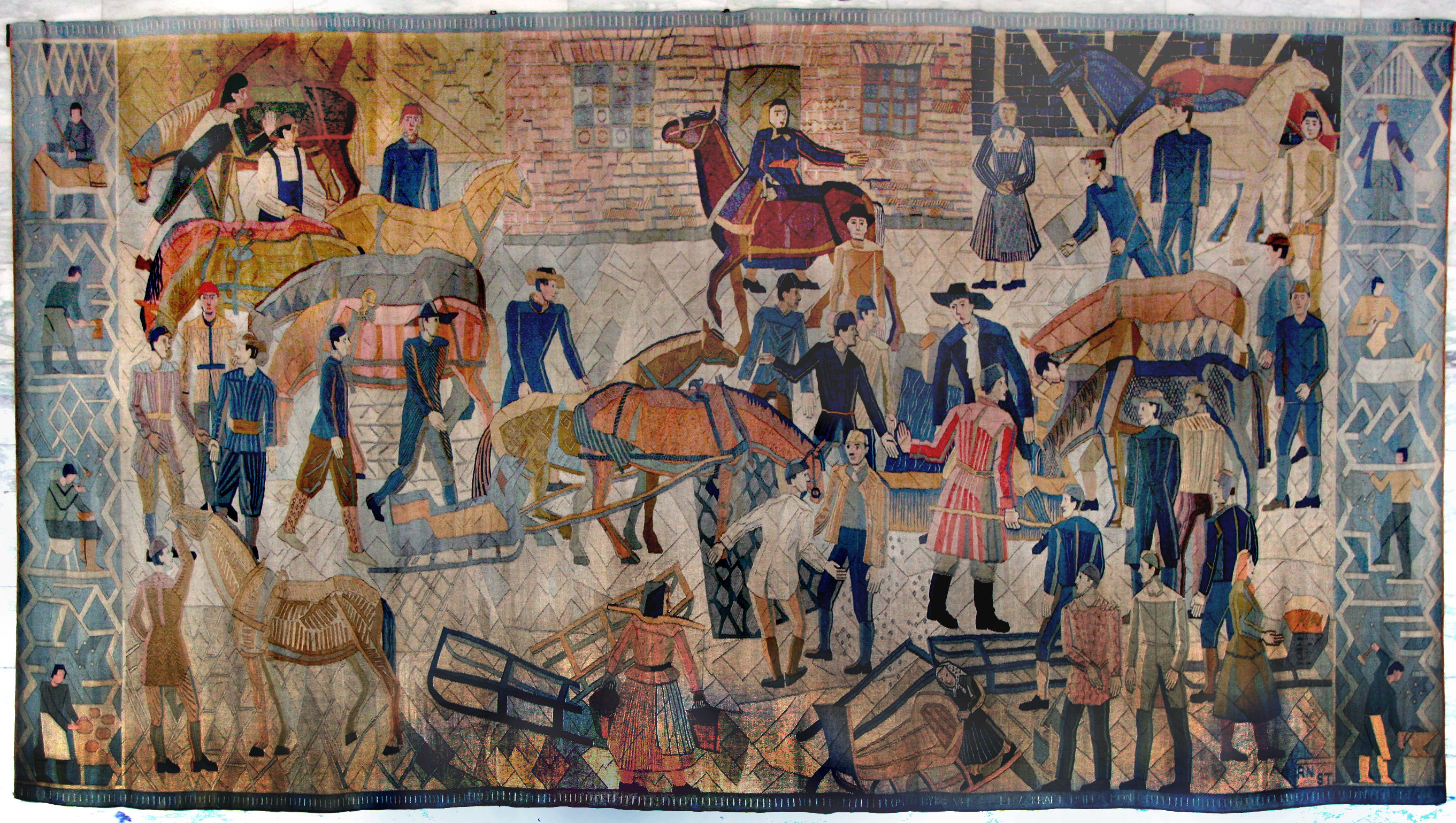
Tapestry, Lilletorget in the Town Hall of Oslo. Design by Kåre Jonsborg, woven by Else Halling 1952- 1953. Dimensions 2,5 m x 4,4 m.

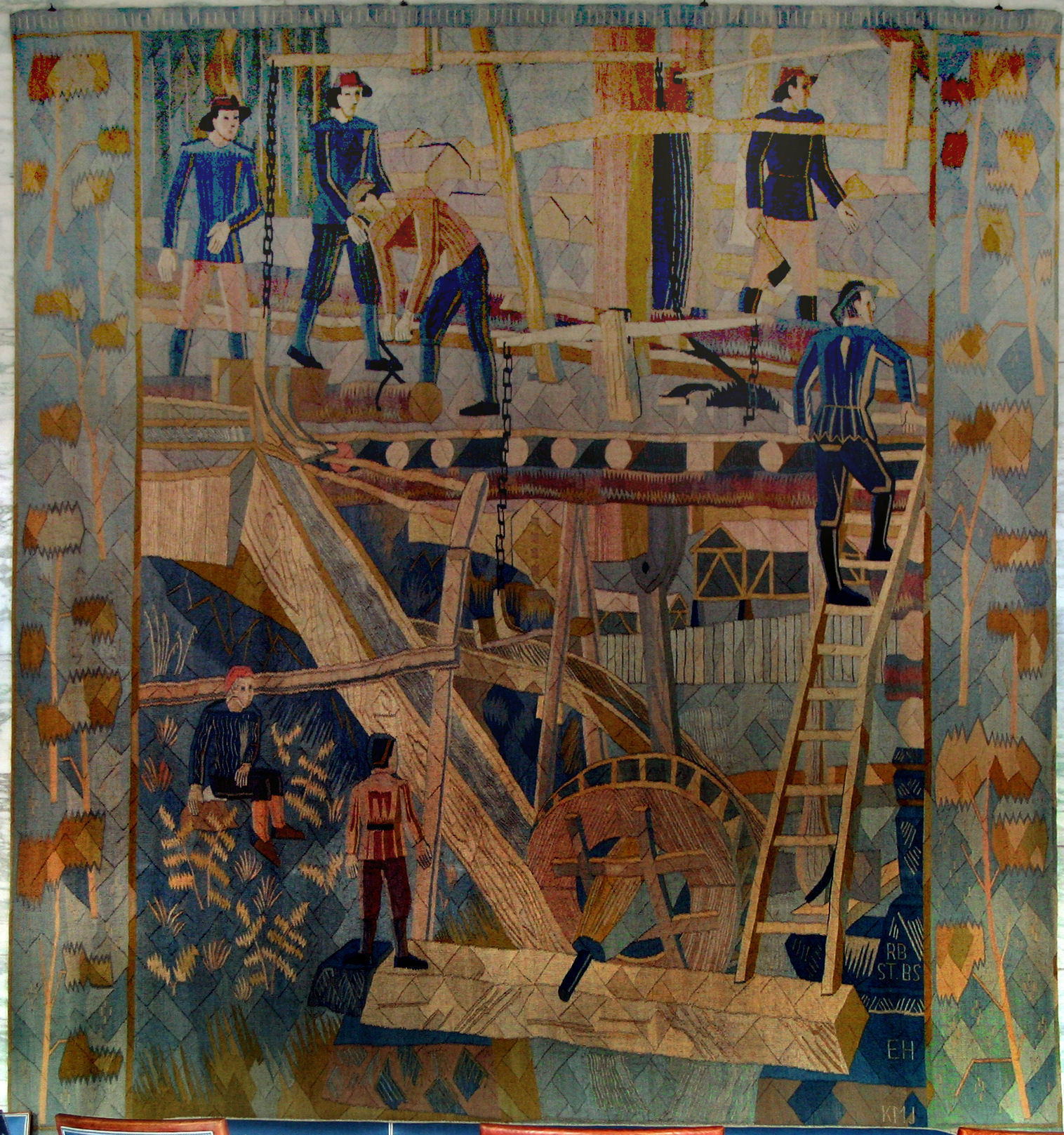
Billedteppe, Saw Mill, 2,5 x 2,5 m in Oslo Town Hall, by Kåre Jonsborg, woven by Else Halling 1952 - 1953.

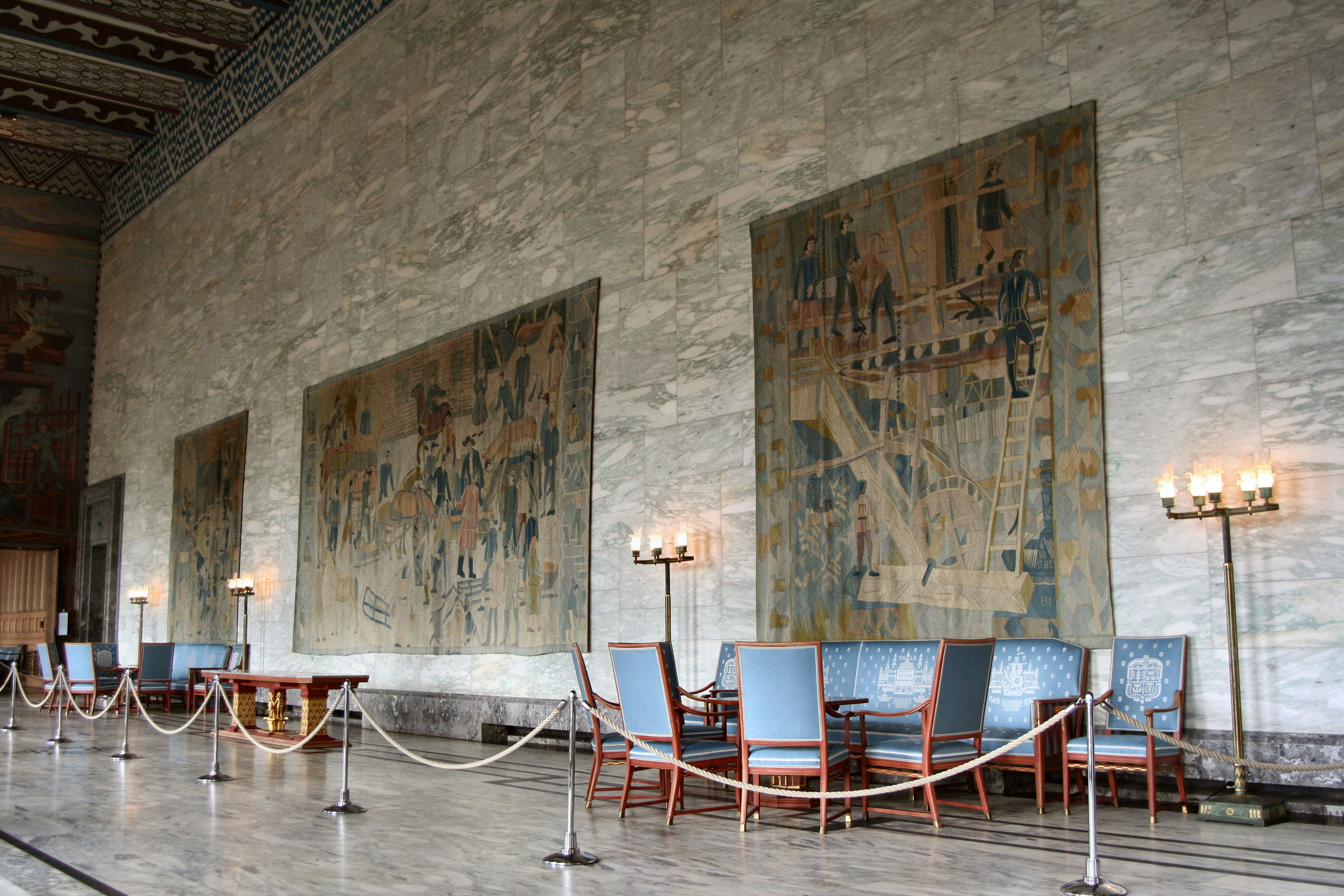
Tapestries displayed in the festive hall, Oslo Town Hall, by Kåre Jonsborg, woven by Else Halling 1952 - 1953.

Kåre Mikkelsen Jonsborg (11 January 1912 – 10 July 1977) was a Norwegian painter and textile artist.

== Background ==
Kåre Jonsborg was born at Kristiania (now Oslo), Norway. He was the son of John Andreas Mikkelsen (1873-1944) and Anne Elise Ebbell (1884-1950). At five years of age, his family moved to Solør, where his father worked as an artsmith. He studied under Axel Revold, Jean Heiberg and Georg Jacobsen at the Norwegian National Academy of Craft and Art Industry in Oslo from 1933-38. From 1965 until his death in 1977, he was employed by the Norwegian National Academy of Fine Arts.

== Career ==
Jonsborg debuted at the Autumn Exhibition (Høstutstillingen) in Oslo during 1935. Three years later he won the 3rd prize in the competition for decoration in Oslo City Hall.

His works span from oil, tempera, woodcutting and through to stone mosaics. He created a number of altar pieces among others in Svalbard Church and Tonsen Church in Oslo. He also created a vast production of figurative paintings and tapestry designs including at Steinkjer Church. For many years he had a fruitful partnership with textile artist Else Halling (1899-1987), aiming to find a useful range of plant dyes for dying wool from spelsau. The cooperation resulted in significant achievements including designs for monumental tapestries in Oslo City Hall (woven by Else Halling).

In his art he was dedicated to geometrical theories of how to build and compose pictures, of the art and colour theories of Piero della Francesca, Paul Cézanne, Pablo Picasso og Eugène Delacroix. All his life he studied the old masters and travelled in Europe and collected a vast documentation of the masters' composition techniques.

He was an invited participant at the international biennale, "Biennale internationale de tapisserie" in the Cantonal Museum of Fine Arts in Lausanne and is discussed in the work of Pierre Verlet-Michel Florisone and Adolf Hoffmeister-Francois Tabard: Le grand livre de la tapisserie (Paris: Bibliothèque des arts, 1965). He was awarded a number of distinctions including Schlytters og Mohrs legat (1939), Statens reisestipend (1952) and Thomas Fearnleys Minnestipend (1955). He is represented in the National Gallery in Oslo and was awarded the King's Medal of Merit (Kongens fortjenstmedalje).

== Other Sources ==
- Waadeland, Ruth (2008) Kunstneren Kåre Mikkelsen Jonsborg: jakobineren fra de store skoger (Trondheim : Tapir akademisk forl) ISBN 9788251924030
