= Honoratus Halling =

Norwegian priest, magazine editor

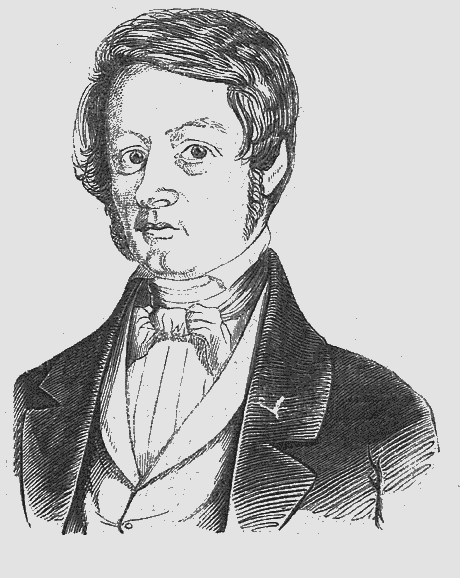
- Born: 14 November 1819; Odalen, Norway
- Died: 9 April 1886 (aged 66); Ljan, Norway
- Occupations: priest, magazine editor and non-fiction writer
- Children: Sigurd Halling
- Relatives: Else Halling (granddaughter); Louis Moe (nephew)

Honoratus Halling (14 November 1819 – 9 April 1886) was a Norwegian priest, magazine editor, politician and non-fiction writer.

He was born in Odalen (in the present-day Nord-Odal Municipality) in Hedmark county, Norway. He was the son of parish priest Peter Herman Halling (1777–1825) and Nikoline Moe (1787–1865). He took a theological degree at the University of Christiania in 1843 and subsequently held various clerical positions. In 1858, he was a parish priest at Horten Church in Vestfold. He became mayor of Horten Municipality, but resigned after a year. He was priest for Lom Municipality in Oppland (1864-1875) and took the same position in Østre Aker (1875-1885).

During the mid 1800s, he resided in the Enerhaugen neighborhood of Christiania (now Oslo). He started the magazine For Fattig og Riig in 1848, which he edited from 1848 to 1855. He founded the organization Samfundet paa Enerhougen in 1850. Among his books are En liden Postille for Børn from 1846, and Husandagtsbog from 1860.

He was married in 1844 to Fredrikke Petrine Weyergang (1820-1860). After her death, he married Marie Henrikke Bomhoff (1837-1907). He was the father of Sigurd Halling, grandfather of Else Halling, and uncle of Louis Moe. He died in the neighborhood of Ljan in Oslo, Norway during 1886.
