= Julius Middelthun =

Norwegian sculptor and educator (1820–1886)

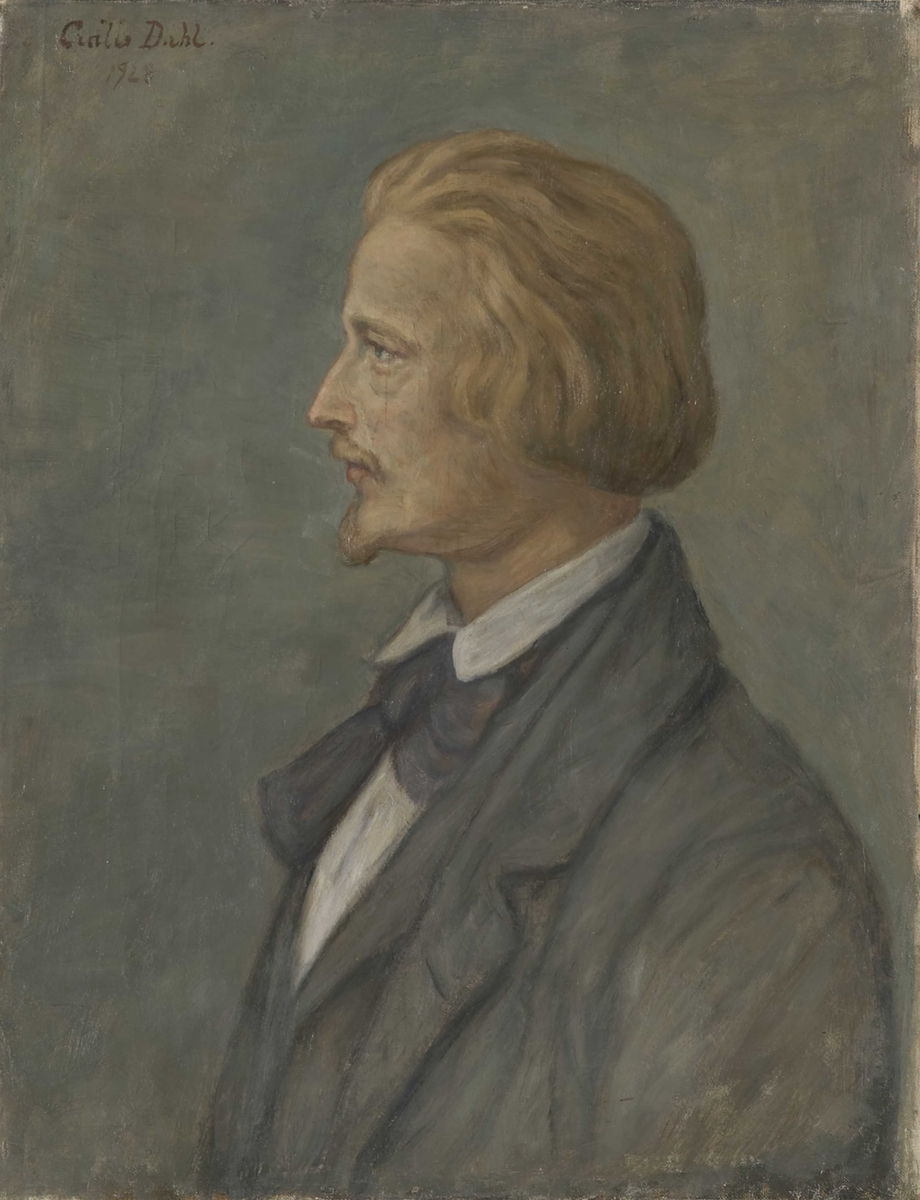
Portrait of Julius Middelthun by Cecilie Dahl (1928)

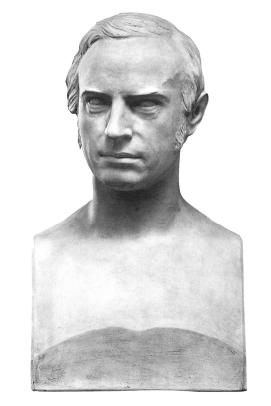
Bust of Johan Sebastian Welhaven by Julius Middelthun (1867)

Julius Olavus Middelthun (3 July 1820 – 5 May 1886) was a Norwegian sculptor and educator. He is most associated with his busts and statues.

== Biography ==
Middelthun was born at Kongsberg in Buskerud, Norway. He was the son of Georg Middelthun (1779–1831) and Maren Margrethe Jørgensen (1785–1829). His father was employed at the Royal Norwegian Mint in Kongsberg. As a young man, he trained as a goldsmith before moving to Copenhagen to study with Herman Wilhelm Bissen. His ten years there were followed by eight years in Rome (1851–1856), after which he returned to Norway.

From 1869 until his death in 1886, Middlethun taught at the Royal Drawing School in Christiania (Tegneskolen i Kristiania), now the Norwegian National Academy of Craft and Art Industry in Oslo. Among his students were Erik Werenskiold (1883), Louis Moe, Theodor Kittelsen (1874), and Edvard Munch (1881), who painted the famous painting The Scream.

== Selected works ==
- Bust of Henrik Wergeland, University Library, Oslo (1861)
- Bust of Johan Sebastian Welhaven, University Library, Oslo (1861)
- Bust of Otto Thott Fritzner, Trondheim Cathedral School (1862)
- Bust of Ole Jacob Broch, National Gallery of Norway (1869)
- Bust of Jakob Aall, National Gallery of Norway (1871)
- Bronze bust of Halfdan Kjerulf, Halfdan Kjerulfs plass, Oslo (1874)
- Statue of Anton Martin Schweigaard, University Square, Oslo (1883)
