= Sigurd Halling =

Norwegian educator (1866–1938)

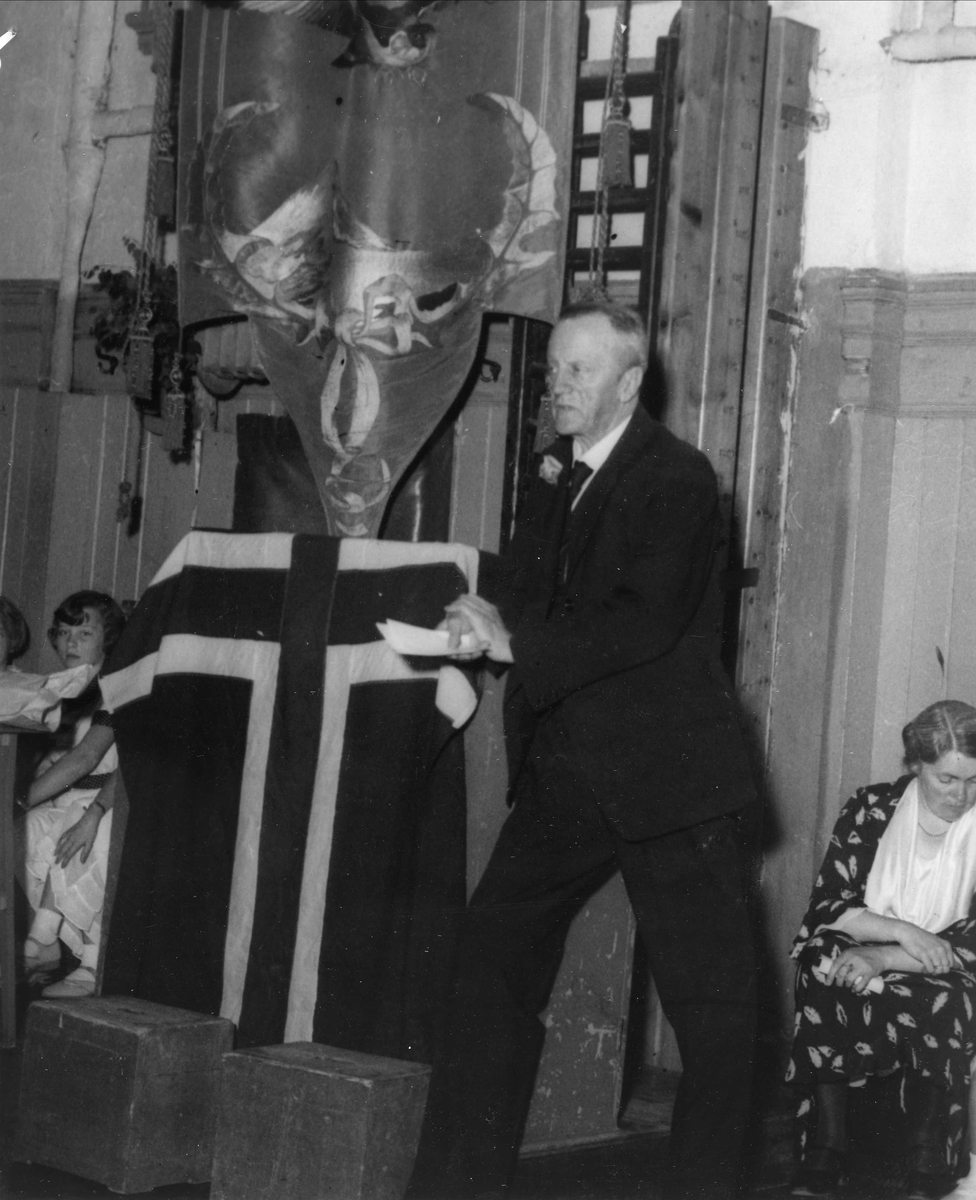
- Born: 20 July 1866; Lom Municipality, Norway
- Died: 25 July 1938 (aged 72)
- Occupation: educator
- Parent: Honoratus Halling
- Relatives: Else Halling (niece)

Sigurd Halling (20 July 1866 – 25 July 1938) was a Norwegian educator.

== Personal life ==
Halling was born on 20 July 1866 in Lom, Norway, to Honoratus Halling and Marie Henrikke Bomhoff. He was an uncle of Else Halling.

== Career ==
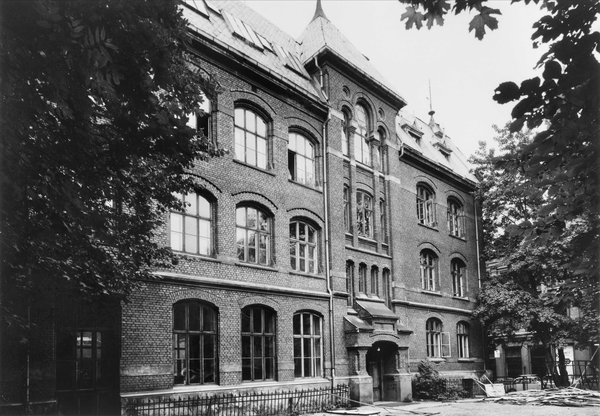
Halling's School in Oslo

He graduated as cand.theol. from the University in Christiania in 1892. He worked as a teacher and headmaster at various schools in Kristiania. From 1907 he was in charge of both Otto Anderssen's private school and the Conradi Sisters' girl school. These were united and renamed to Halling's School. He was the principal teacher for prince Olav from 1913 to 1921. He was decorated as Knight, First Class of the Order of St. Olav in 1921.
