= Sigurd Nome =

Norwegian sculptor

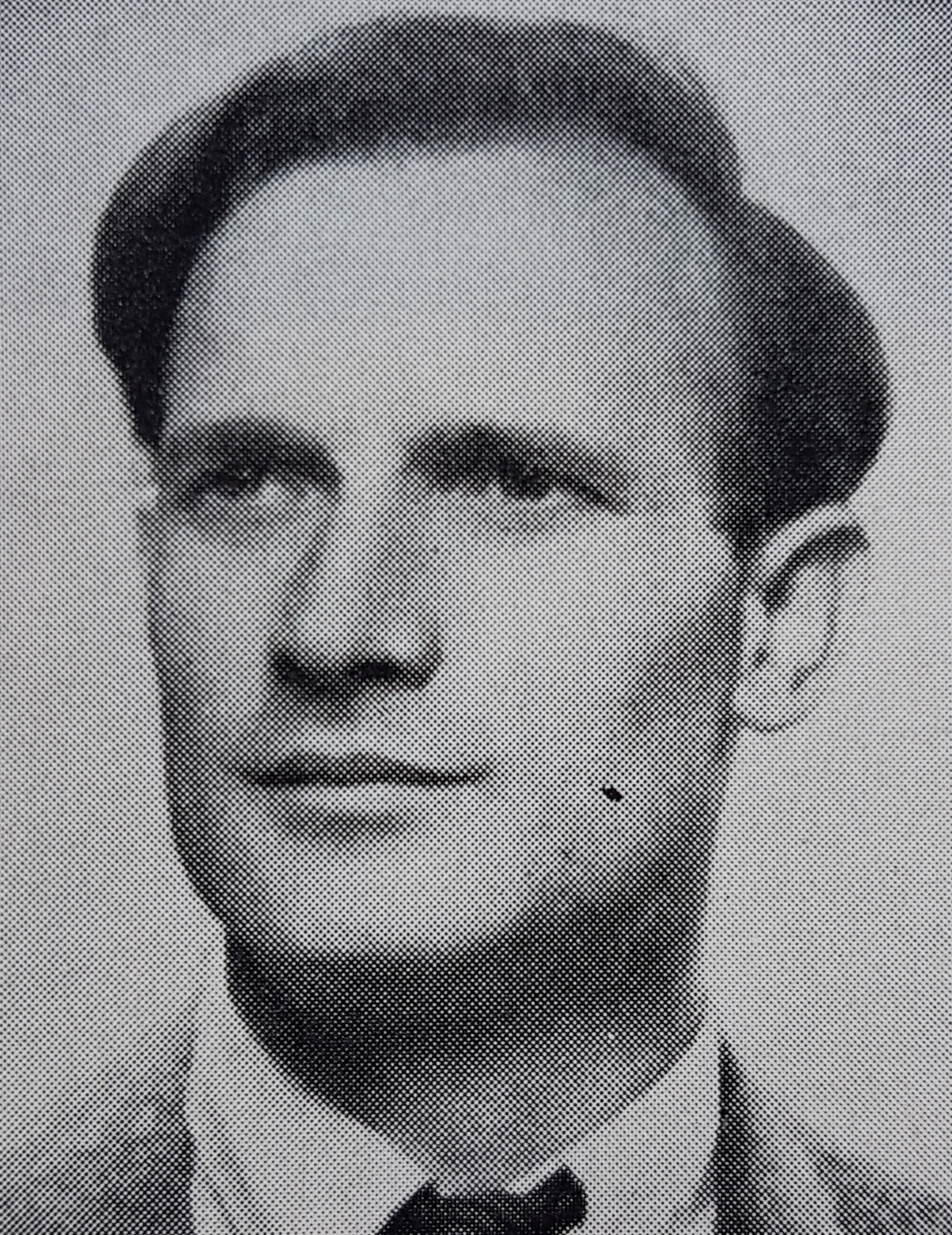
- Sigurd Nome
- Born: 16 November 1911; Øyslebø, Norway
- Died: 31 January 1972 (aged 82); Oslo, Norway
- Occupation: Sculptor

Sigurd Nome (born 16 November 1911, Øyslebø, Norway, d. 23 November 1970, Oslo) was a Norwegian sculptor.

== Early life and education ==
Sigurd Nome was the sixth of twelve children. He married Ellen Marie Bjørløw and has three children, Helle, Herdis and Arild.

Like many other Norwegian sculptors, Nome began wood carving at a very early age, exhibiting a chair and model of a carriage with two horses in 1926. As he was only 16 years old he was too young to compete for the prizes, but received a silver spoon as encouragement. He studied wood-carving from 1929 to 1931 at the Hjerleid School and Craft Centre in Dovre Municipality. After extensive art studies, including the State Academy of Fine Arts from 1935 to 1937, his first exhibition was at the National Annual Autumn Exhibition in Oslo in 1937.

== Work ==
In Oslo Sigurd Nome ornamented the east facade of the Oslo City Hall with his sculpture Rorkaren (The Oarsman, 1945). Gardisten (The Royal Guard) was part of his first solo exhibition at Kunstnerforbundet in 1949, and is now located at Huseby Leir, the base of His Majesty the King's Guard. Other major sculptures are:

- Mandalitten, Mandal, 1966
- Tromsøværingen, Tromsø, 1969
- The monument of Hans Nielsen Hauge (19th-century Lutheran lay minister and social reformer), Oslo, 1972

When the Vigeland museum had a commemorative exhibition of Nome's work in 2000, Fredrikke Schrumpf wrote in the catalogue: “A distinctive strength in Nome's work is how the sculpture both possesses general features and is at the same time a personal portrait. This duality that the sculptures contain is also seen again in Nome's children's sculpture. His own children were the model, but with Nome's shape and general expression it could be any child.” His siblings and extended family were often portrayed in his sculptures, and his statues of children became coveted for publicly commissioned ornamentation all over the country.

Nome's family donated a large collection of sculptures to Marnardal Municipality. This collection is now displayed at Høgtun Kultursenter in Øyslebø.
