= Gamle rådhus (Oslo) =

Coordinates: 59°54′36.086″N 10°44′24.482″E

Gamle rådhus The Old Town Hall
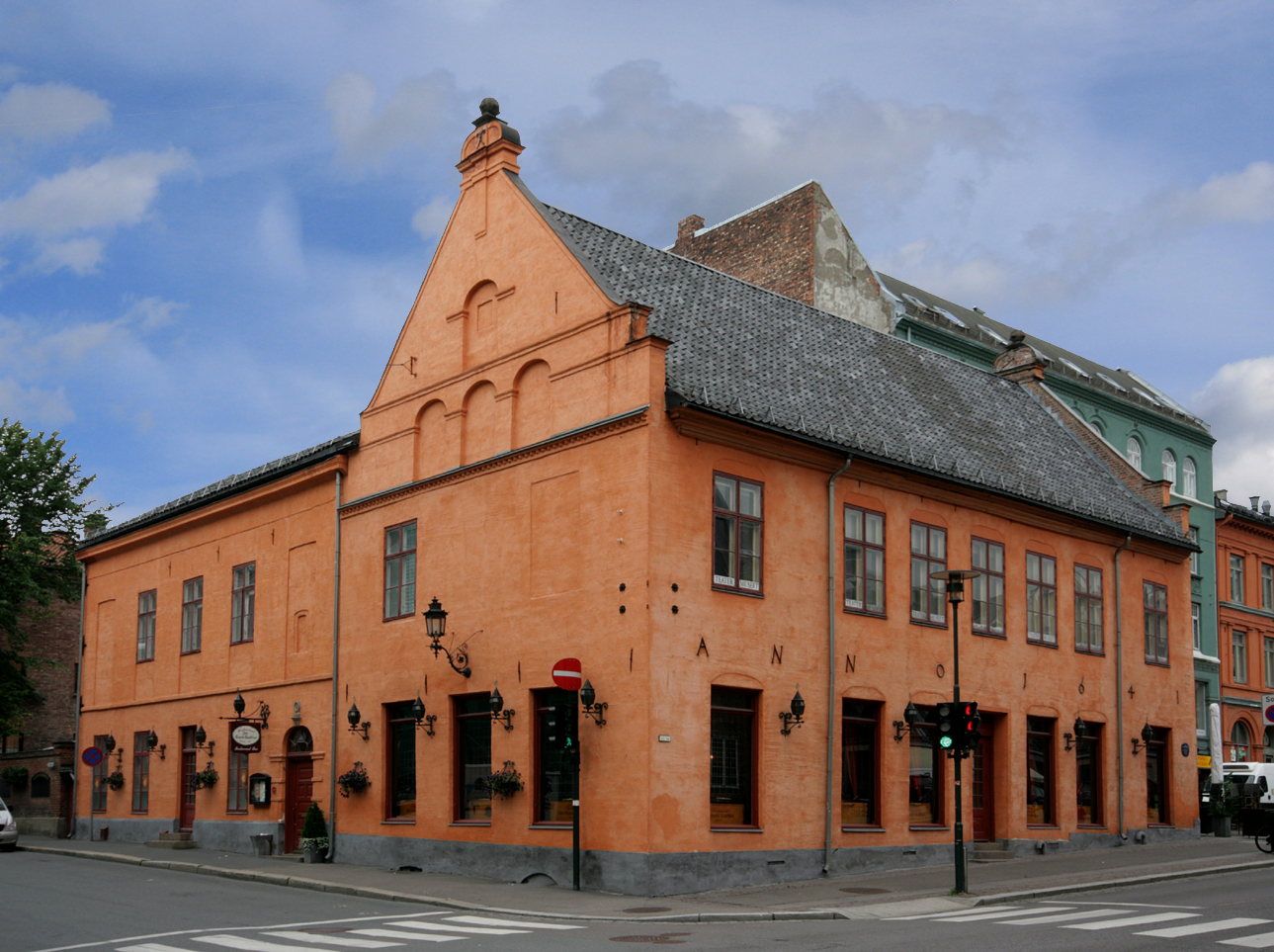
- Interactive map of the Gamle rådhus The Old Town Hall area

General information
- Type: Former town hall Now: Restaurant
- Location: Christiania, Oslo, Norway
- Completed: 1641

Technical details
- Structural system: Timber framing

Gamle rådhus (English: The Old Town Hall) is a building with a long history in Oslo, Norway. It is one of the oldest buildings in the Norwegian capital. It was built as the first town hall in Christiania (a former name of the City of Oslo, not to be confused with the Old Town, Oslo) in 1641. The construction of the town hall got financial support by King Christian IV. The building has historically been used for many purposes. A restaurant was appointed in a side wing in 1856 and moved to the main house in 1925. From 1980 to 2010 a theatre museum was located in the side wing of the first floor. The Old Town Hall is listed and protected by law by the Norwegian Directorate for Cultural Heritage.

== History ==
The building was the Town Hall of Christiania between 1641 and 1733 on a central location right next to Akershus Fortress. It was later used as a fire station, temporarily as a church, then a private residence, the Supreme Court of Norway, the city's grand hall, a jail, the Freemason's meeting place, a museum and the current restaurant.

The restaurant moved to the main floor of the main house in 1925. Much of the inventory of the former restaurant was preserved. The building was damaged by fire in 1996, but was repaired and recreated by the owner, the City of Oslo.

== Restaurant ==
The building is still used as a restaurant as well as various reception rooms, concerts, performances and conferences in the first floor. The original arrest basement is preserved and serves today as a wine cellar and banquet facilities for up to 20 guests. There is a beer garden and dining in the backyard from May to September.

The splurge menu is based on the traditional Norwegian cuisine with local ingredients, which includes lutefisk and other seafood and reindeer meat.

== See also ==
- Oslo Town Hall
- History of Oslo
- History of Oslo's name
