= Else Poulsson =

Norwegian artist (1909–2002)

- Born: 24 March 1909; Rjukan, Norway
- Died: 10 February 2002 (aged 92); Bærum, Norway
- Known for: Textile Art, Painting

Else Poulsson (24 March 1909 – 10 February 2002) was a Norwegian painter and textile artist.

== Early life and education ==
Poulsson was born in Rjukan in Telemark, Norway on 24 March 1909. She was the daughter of Jens Jørgensen Poulsson and Vivi Lange, and was a sister of Colonel Jens-Anton Poulsson and a niece of architect Magnus Poulsson.

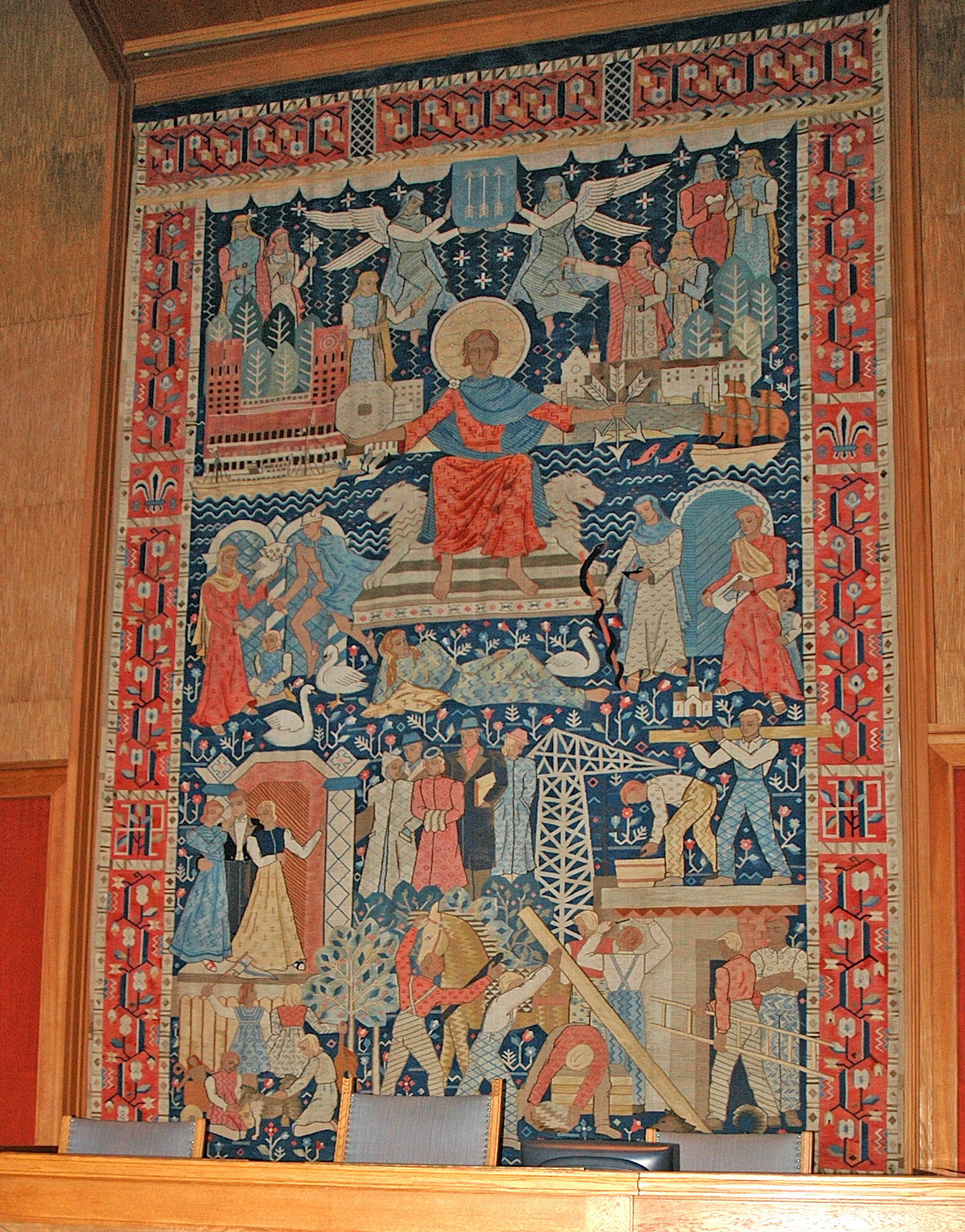
St. Hallvard tapestry at Oslo City Hall

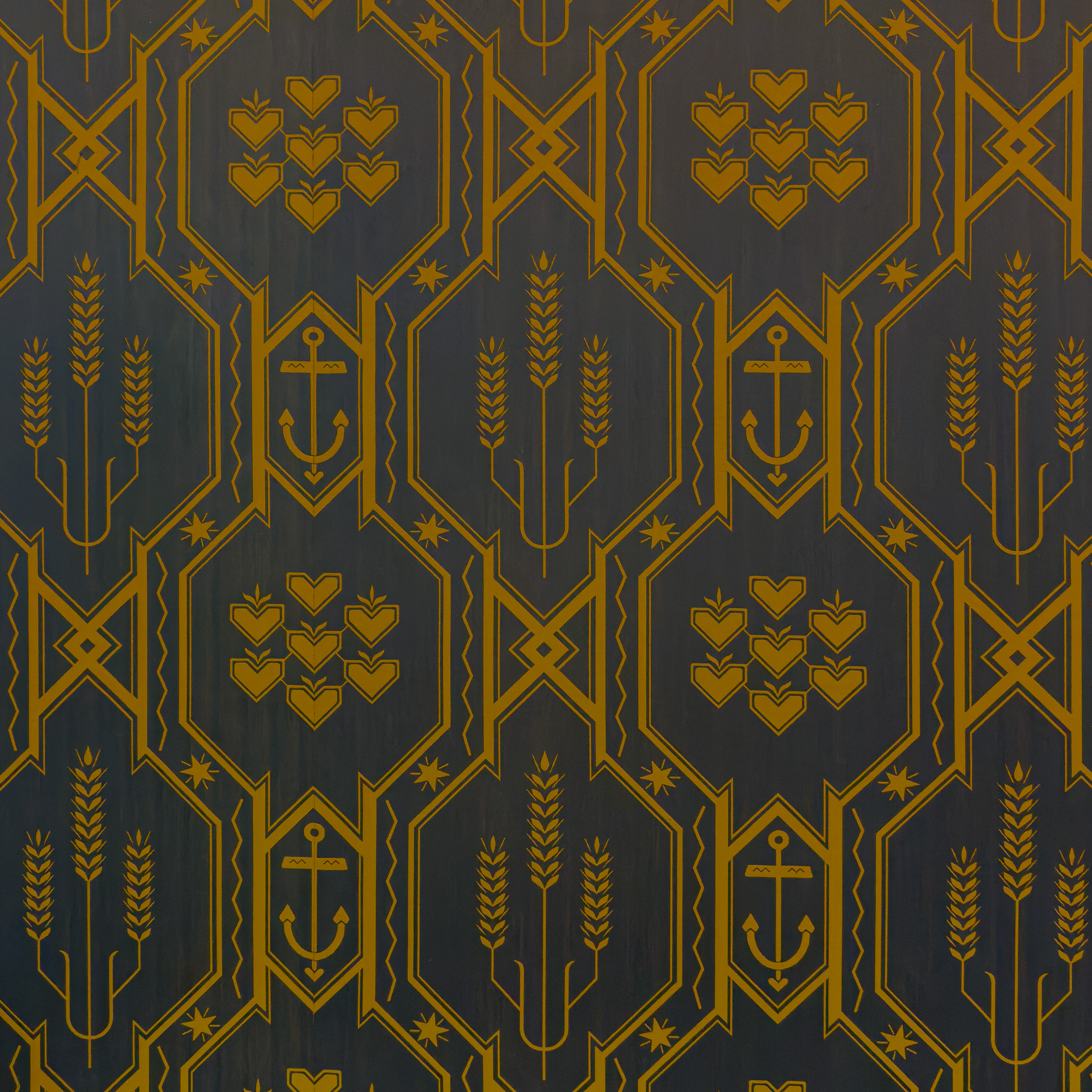
Detail of the wallpaper of the United Nations Security Council chamber, designed by Poulsson.

Poulsson was educated at Statens kvinnelige industriskole (1925–1927) then at the Norwegian National Academy of Craft and Art Industry, alongside Enevold Thømt, in Oslo (1927–1929). She also took courses at Johanna Brunson's weaving school in Stockholm and the Tavastehus weaving school in Finland. Poulsson was awarded the Norwegian Handicraft Association's scholarship in 1930 and the Norwegian Textile Industry's travelling grant in 1963.

== Career ==
From 1929 to 1954 she worked for Den Norske Husflidsforening (Norwegian Handicraft Association). She was a draughtswoman and later head of the textile studio in the years.

Among her designs are several decorations for Oslo City Hall, including a carpet design, St. Hallvard, which was woven by Else Halling. She also designed rugs, carpets, curtain and upholstery fabrics and wallpapers for the building, which was designed by her uncle Magnus.

Poulsson also produced designs for the Headquarters of the United Nations in New York City, a carpet design for Nordenfjeldske Kunstindustrimuseum, Trondheim and embroidery for the Museum of Decorative Arts in Oslo.

== Exhibitions ==
Poulsson showed work in collective exhibitions

- National Exhibition, Bergen, 1928
- Stockholm exhibition, 1930
- National exhibition, Trondheim, 1930
- Norsk Prydkunstlag's Christmas exhibition, Kunstnerforbundet, Oslo, 1930
- World Exhibition, Paris, 1937
- Norwegian Applied Arts 1951, Gothenburg
- Norwegian Applied Arts 1951, Copenhagen
- Design in Scandinavia, travelling exhibition USA, 1954
- Norwegian Textiles Now, Museum of Decorative Arts in Oslo, 1971

Solo exhibitions

- Kunstnerforbundet, Oslo, 1961
- Museum of Decorative Arts in Oslo, 1966

== Awards ==
- 1st prize in competition for tableware for Oslo City Hall 1947
- 1st prize in a competition for textiles Oslo City Hall 1948

== Personal life ==
Poulsson married lecturer Per Reetz Moe in 1942.

She died in Bærum on 10 February 2002.
