= Else Halling =

Norwegian textile artist (1899–1987)

- Born: 3 July 1899; Øvre Eiker, Norway
- Died: 14 February 1987 (aged 87); Oslo
- Occupation: Textile artist
- Relatives: Honoratus Halling – grandfather Sigurd Halling – uncle

Else Halling (3 July 1899 – 14 February 1987) was a Norwegian textile artist.

She is known for her reconstructions of old Norwegian tapestry, and taught weaving in Trondheim, Drammen and Oslo. She decorated public institutions such as the Royal Palace in Oslo, the Akershus Castle, the Stortinget building, and the Oslo City Hall.

== Personal life ==
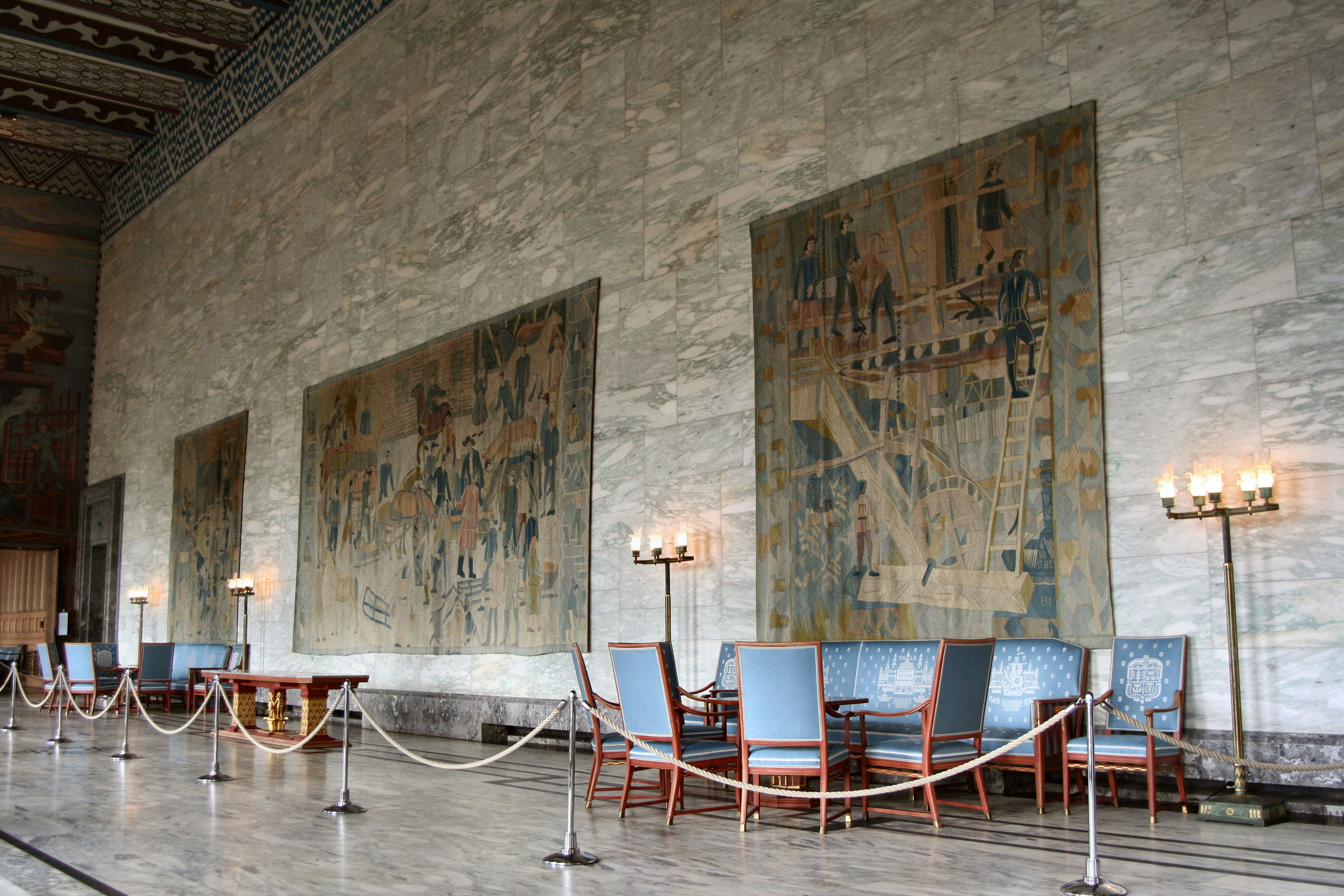
Tapestry decorations at the Oslo City Hall, designed by Kåre Jonsborg and woven by Else Halling

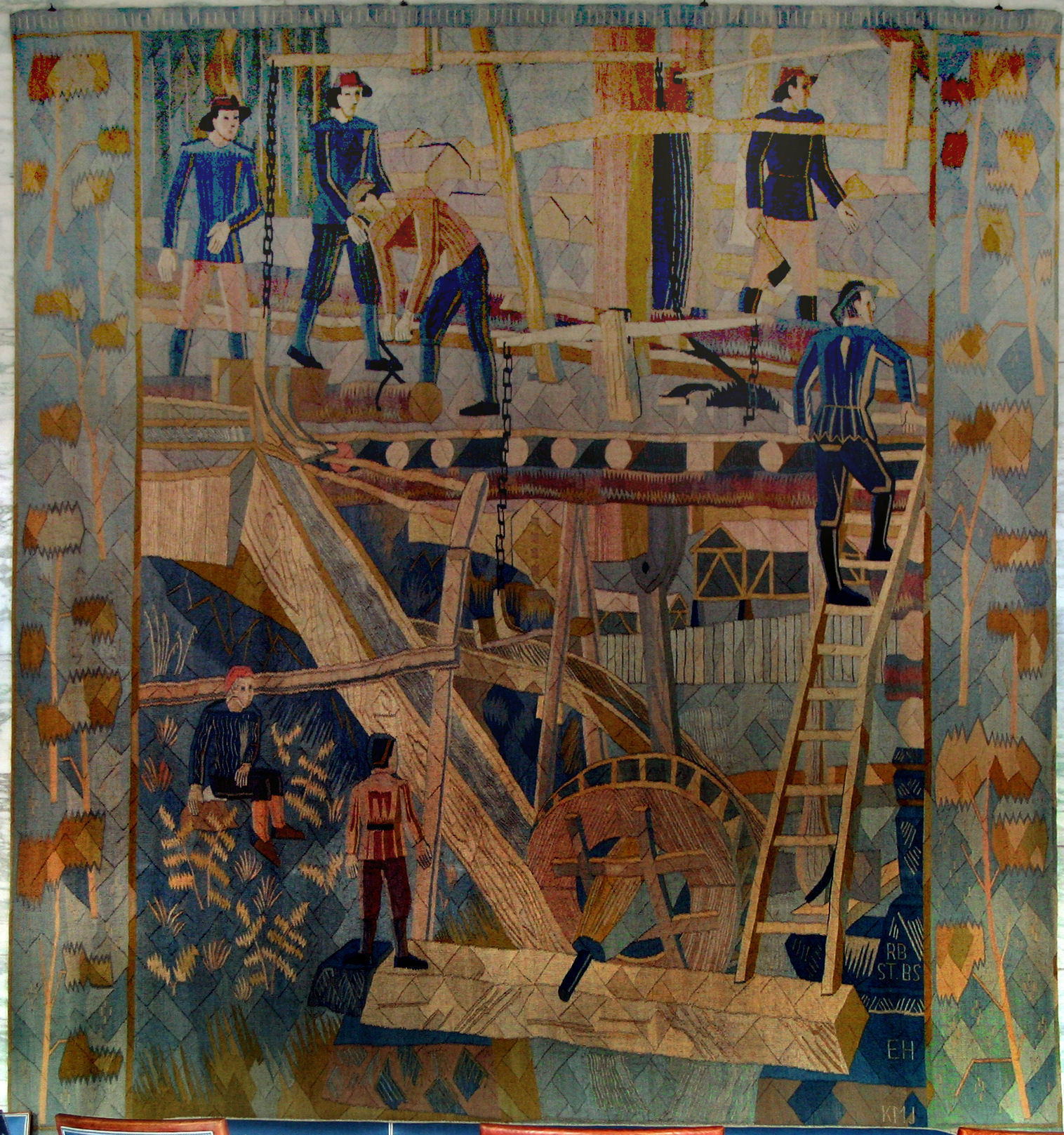
Saw mill, tapestry woven by Else Halling, designed by Kåre Jonsborg, in the Oslo City Hall

Halling was born in Øvre Eiker to a priest, Johannes Swensen, and Marie Halling. She was a granddaughter of priest and labour movement pioneer, Honoratus Halling, and niece of educator, Sigurd Halling. She died in Oslo in 1987.

== Career ==
Halling was educated at the Norwegian National Academy of Craft and Art Industry in Kristiania, and eventually made further studies in Sweden, Denmark, Finland, France and Austria. From 1925 to 1928 she was running a private weaving school in Trondheim. She was teacher in Drammen from 1931 to 1934, and was running her own weaving school in Oslo from 1936 to 1940. Cooperating with the Norwegian Museum of Decorative Arts and Design, she made reconstructions of old Norwegian tapestry, utilising old dyeing techniques and spælsau yarn. From 1941 to 1963 she taught tapestry weaving at the Statens Kvinnelige Industriskole. She was artistical leader of the studio Norsk billedvev from 1951 to 1968, through which she delivered decorations to a number of public institutions, including the Royal Palace, the Akershus Castle, the Stortinget building, and the Oslo City Hall.

Among her carpets are St. Hallvard (designed by Else Poulsson), Bataljer på Lilletorvet (designed by Kåre Jonsborg), Sagbruket (Jonsborg) and Kjølhalingsplassen (Jonsborg), all at the Oslo City Hall.

Her tapestry Kongeteppet at the Royal Palace in Oslo was designed by Alf Rolfsen, and the three carpets Solens gang at Stortinget were designed by Karen Holtsmark. The tapestry Heroica at the Parliament of Finland was designed by Håkon Stenstadvold .

She was awarded the King's Medal of Merit in gold, and was decorated Knight, First Class of the Order of St. Olav in 1967.
