= Louis Moe =

Norwegian illustrator and painter (1857–1945)

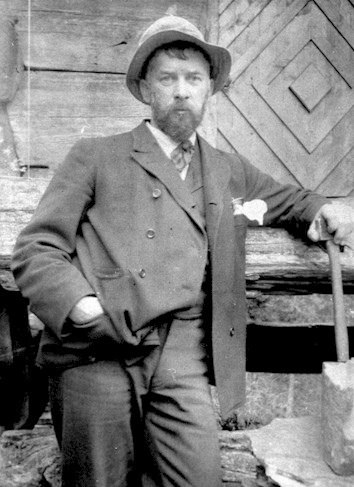
- Moe c. 1910
- Born: 20 April 1857; Arendal, Norway
- Died: 23 October 1945 (aged 88); Copenhagen, Denmark
- Occupation: Painter
- Relatives: Honoratus Halling (uncle)

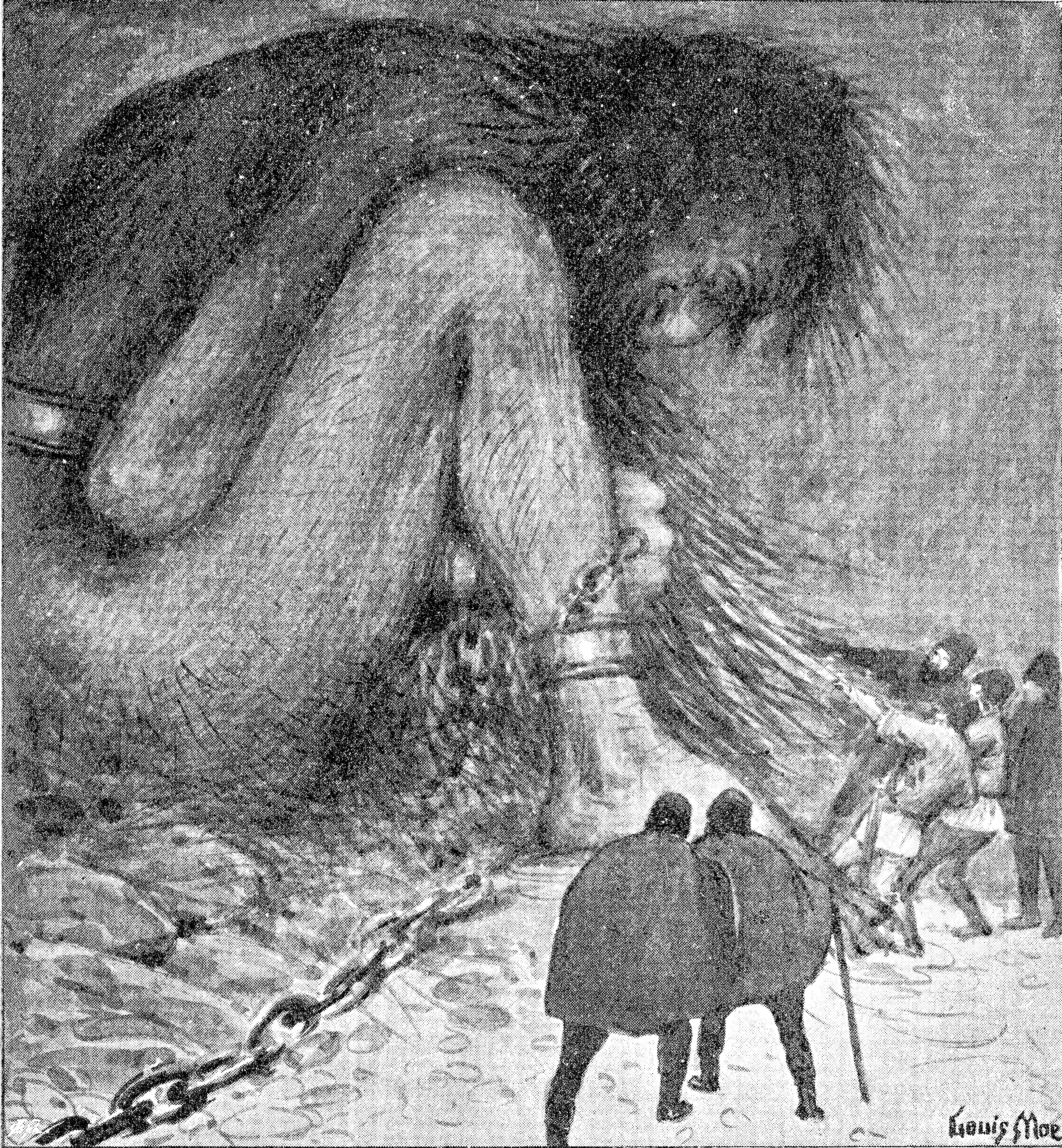
The giant Utgarthilocus, chained in the cave. From an 1898 edition of Saxo Grammaticus' chronicles (Gesta Danorum).

Louis Moe (20 April 1857 – 23 October 1945) was a Norwegian painter, illustrator and writer who settled in Denmark.

He is known for his many book illustrations, illustrated classical works, fairytales, children's books and books on mythology, and contributed to children's magazines and weekly magazines. He is represented in the National Gallery in Oslo, and the Danish Museum of Art & Design in Copenhagen.

== Personal life ==
Moe was born in Arendal to a dentist, Halvor Georg Theodor Moe, and Hansine Constance Halling. He was a nephew of priest and labour movement pioneer, Honoratus Halling. He married Inger Møller in 1897.

== Career ==
Moe studied with sculptor Julius Middelthun in Christiania, and later at the Royal Danish Academy of Fine Arts in Copenhagen, and eventually settled in Denmark, becoming a naturalized Danish citizen in 1919. He is best known for his many book illustrations. He illustrated classical works as well as fairytales and children's books. He was also a graphic artist, and several of his works had decadent erotic motifs, such as naked women with monsters or animals.

Among his paintings are Portrettgruppe (portrait group) from 1887, Jætteætt (1888), Bondepige fra Norges Vestkyst (farmer girl from the West Coast of Norway) from 1891, and Drageoffer (Dragon victim) from 1894.

From 1897 he regularly spent several months every year at his summer farm Juvlandsæter in Vrådal in Kviteseid Municipality, Norway, and Telemark was an important source of inspiration for his artistical work. He published the book Langt, langt borte i Skoge! (Far, far away in the woods) in 1904. Solveig Muren Sanden from Vrådal, one of the first significant female Norwegian comics illustrators, was guided by Moe as a young girl.

Moe's illustrations of classical literature include an 1898 edition of Saxo Grammaticus' Gesta Danorum, the Old Norse Poetic Edda, and works by Johan Herman Wessel and Ludvig Holberg. Among his mythological works is the illustration of Tvermose-Thyregod's Oldemoders Fortælling om Nordens Guder (Great-grandmother's story of Norse Gods) (1890), Ragnarok. En Billeddigtning from 1929, and Valkyrjen from 1931. Moe delivered illustrations to the children's magazine Magne and the weekly magazine Norsk Ukeblad for many years.

Moe is represented in the National Gallery in Oslo, the Danish Museum of Art & Design in Copenhagen and in Rasmus Meyers Samlinger in Bergen, and a Louis Moe Gallery has been established in Vrådal. He was decorated Knight of the Order of the Dannebrog in 1931. He died in Copenhagen in 1945.
