= Oslo City Hall =

Municipal building in Norway

- Oslo rådhus
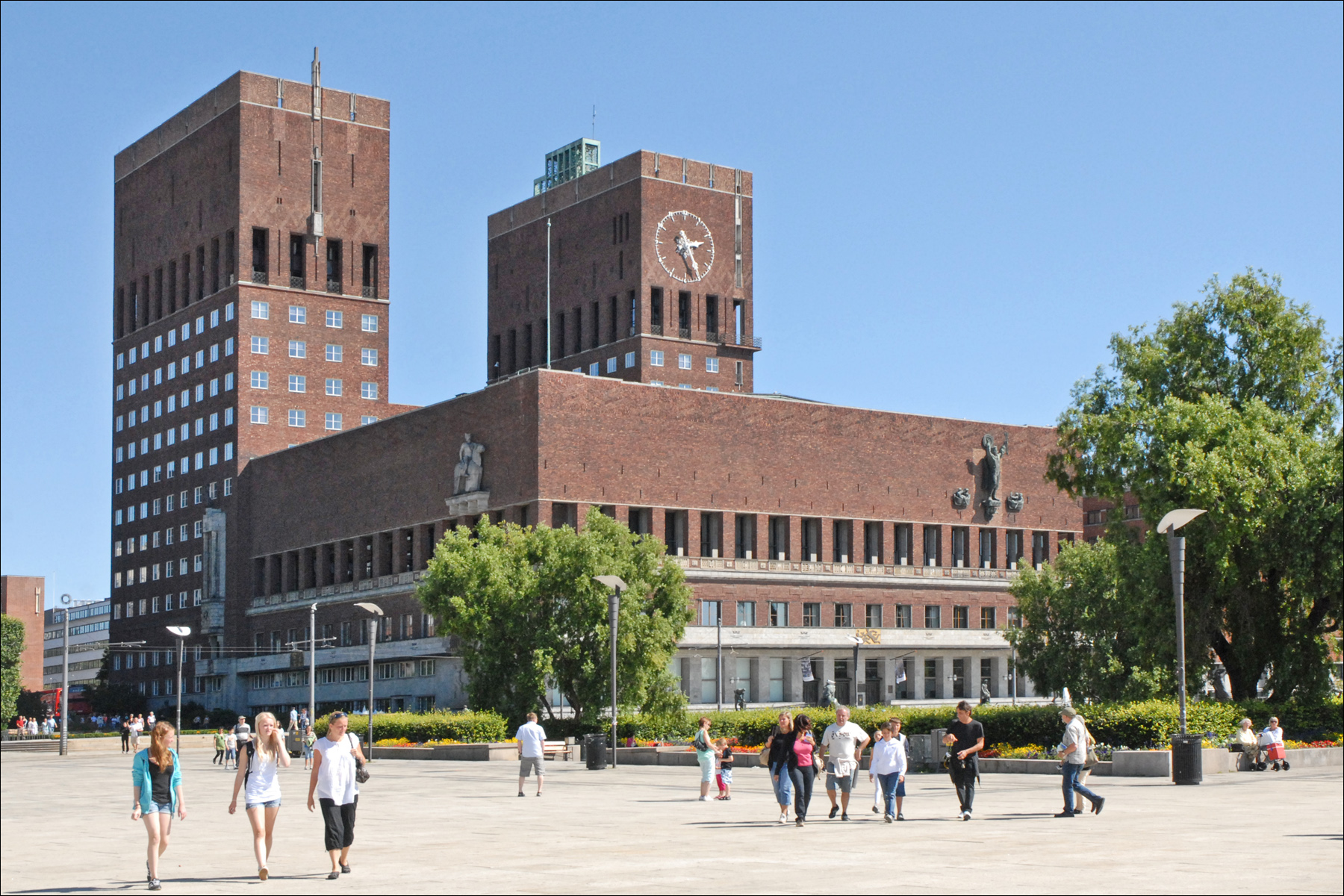
- Oslo City Hall, 2010
- Interactive map of the Oslo City Hall area

General information
- Architectural style: Functionalism
- Location: Oslo, Norway
- Coordinates: 59°54′42.35″N 10°44′0.90″E
- Current tenants: Oslo City Council
- Construction started: 1931
- Completed: 1950
- Inaugurated: 1950
- Owner: Oslo Municipality

Height
- Height: 66 m (217 ft)

Design and construction
- Architects: Arnstein Arneberg, Magnus Poulsson
- Awards: Structure of the Century

Oslo City Hall (Norwegian: Oslo rådhus) is a municipal building in Oslo, the capital of Norway. It houses the city council, the city's administration and various other municipal organisations. The building as it stands today was constructed between 1931 and 1950, with an interruption during the Second World War. It was designed by architects Arnstein Arneberg and Magnus Poulsson. The building is located in the city center, in the northern part of the Pipervika neighbourhood, and it faces Oslofjord.

Oslo City Hall is built of red brick and has two towers, one 63 meters tall and other 66 meters tall. The bricks used are larger than what was typical at the time of construction, but are roughly the same size as bricks used in the Middle Ages. The bricks, measuring approximately 27.5 × 13 × 8.5 cm, were produced by Hovin Teglverk in Oslo. The eastern tower has a carillon set of 49 bells. Various events and ceremonies take place in the building, notably the Nobel Peace Prize ceremony, which takes place every December.

== Earlier City Halls ==
=== Middle Ages ===
It appears that in the Middle Ages, various buildings had the function of a city hall. One source suggests that one of those buildings had a wine cellar which was open to the public.

=== Gamle rådhus ===
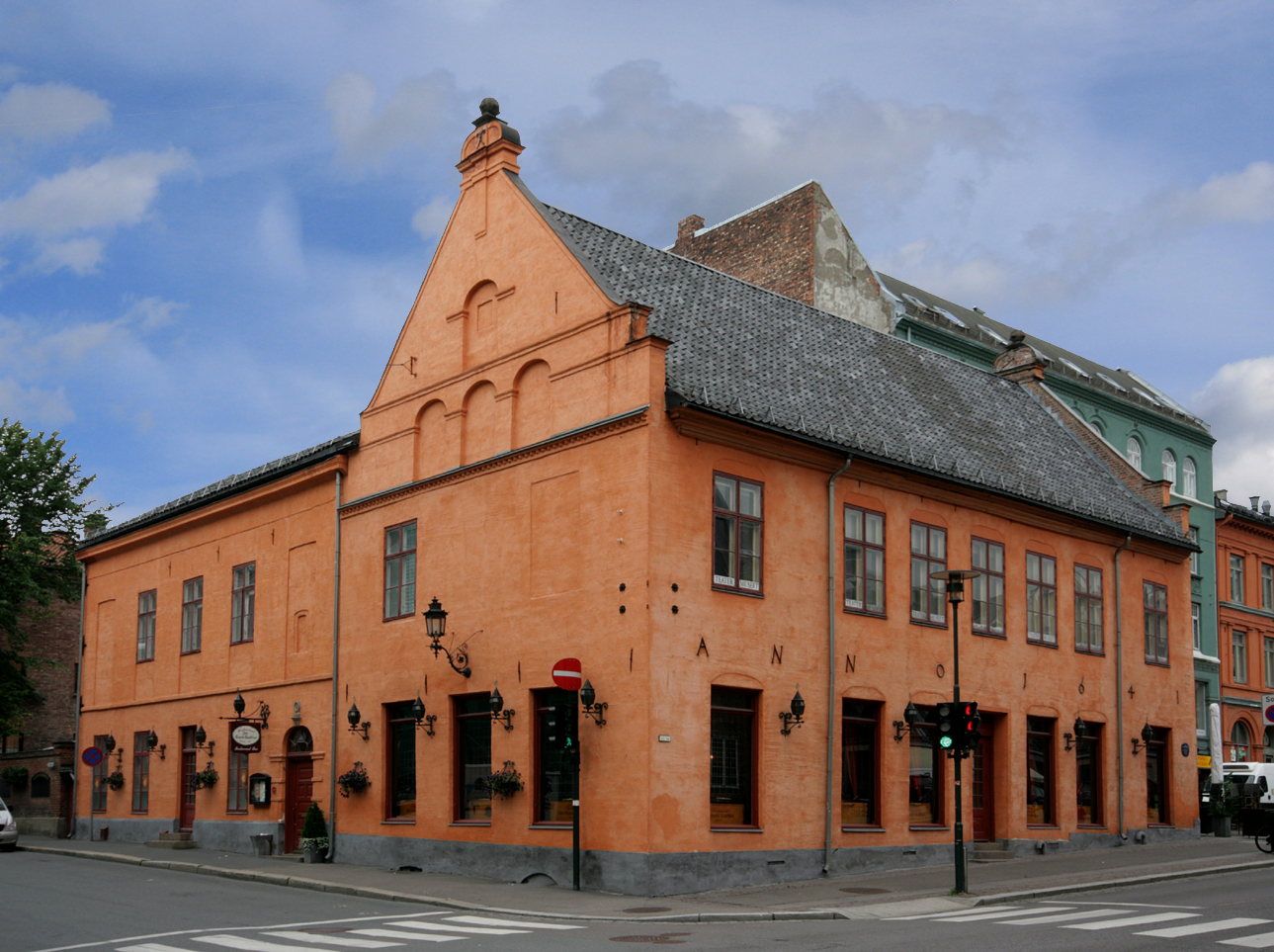
Gamle rådhus, Oslo's former City Hall

In 1624, all of old Oslo burnt to the ground. King Christian IV decided that the city should not be rebuilt at the same location and instead be built to the north of Akershus Fortress. The new city had wide streets at right angles. Building space for a town hall was made available between Rådhusgaten and Øvre Slottsgate. What is today referred to as the old City Hall (Gamle rådhus) was finished in 1641. The building still exists at Nedre Slottsgate 1. The building fell into decay and by 1733 a building at Rådhusgaten 7 was selected to be a new City Hall.

By the 1800s the building was too small and the growing administration moved to various premises across the city.

Architectural competitions were held in 1876 and 1898 for a new building at Hammersborg, but the plans were never carried out due to a lack of funds.

== Modern-day City Hall ==
=== History ===
The idea of building a new city hall in Pipervika was first suggested by architect Oscar Hoff in 1906, but nothing came of the plans. In 1915, the idea was taken up by Hieronymus Heyerdahl, who had just stood down as mayor. He noticed the city's lack of a representative city hall to receive the municipality's guests during the 1914 Jubilee Exhibition in Frogner. He set up an architectural competition which received a total of 44 entries in the first of two rounds. In 1918 Arnstein Arneberg and Magnus Poulsson were selected as winners, whose project was clearly inspired by Stockholm City Hall. A continued lack of funds meant that construction had to wait, and in the intervening years the architects made several changes to the project. In 1930 they present their final draft, which had undergone significant changes, influenced by functionalism. The most apparent change was the addition of two office towers.

The ground stone laying ceremony took place in September 1931, with King Haakon VII and Crown Prince Olav in attendance. Actual construction began in February 1933. Various buildings were also torn down. The city's old amusement park – Tivoli – was also forced to close as a new zoning plan created new plots of land for sale. The purpose was to raise funds for the construction of the building.

In November 1936 the shell of the building was completed. A few floors of office space were in use by the time war broke out in 1940. Construction resumed after the war and the office space was in use by 1947, while final touches were still being added.

Oslo City Hall was officially opened on 15 May 1950, as part of the city's 900-year anniversary. Three musical compositions were written in connection with the celebrations, written by Ludvig Irgens-Jensen, Eivind Groven and Karl Andersen.

By the time it opened in 1950, the style of the building was no longer popular. Brick was in stark contrast to the steel and glass which architects considered modern at the time, and no further buildings were built in that style afterwards. Stockholm's city hall – also in brick – had been designed by Ragnar Östberg, and Martin Nyrop designed Copenhagen City Hall, which is also a monumental brick building. Both Nyrop and Östberg were on the jury which selected the winning design of Oslo City Hall.

=== Decoration ===
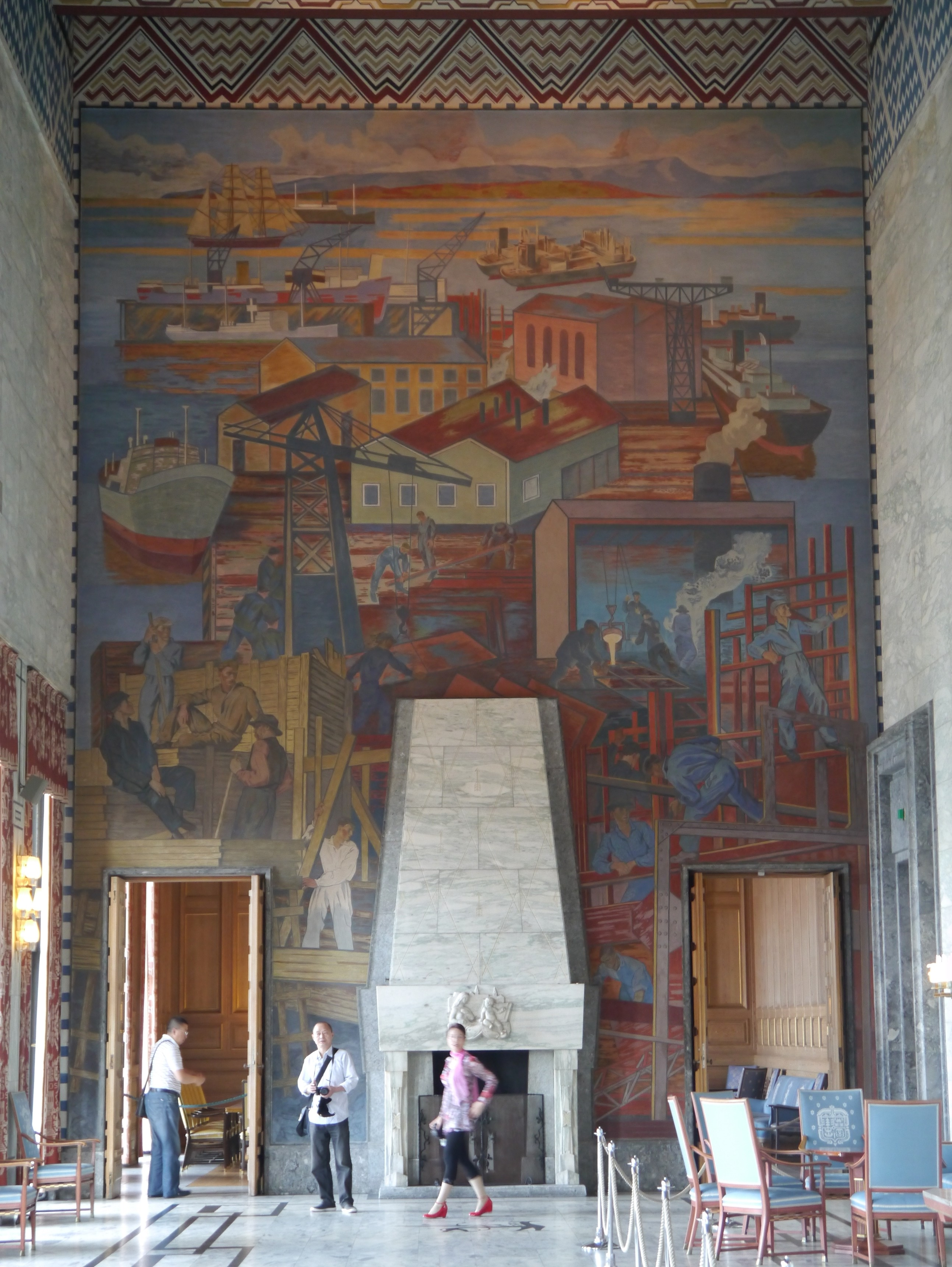
Inside of the City Hall

Various contests were held to decide who would decorate City Hall in January 1937. In all, eight painters and 17 sculptors were hired. Most of the work was completed by the opening of the hall in 1950, though the sculpture park was not completed until the 1960s.

=== Exterior ===
The western wall of the building is dominated by Anne Grimdalen's sculpture of Harald Hardråde on horseback. Nic Schiøll's sculpture of St. Hallvard is at the front of the building, facing Oslofjord. Reliefs by Dagfin Werenskiold face the square and are multicoloured depictions of motifs from the Poetic Edda. Joseph Grimeland designed the bronze relief over the entrance and also the Oslopike ("Oslo girl") high up on the wall. Six free-standing sculptures by Per Palle Storm in front of the building depict the craftsmen who built the building. Sigurd Nome's sculpture "Rorkaren" (The Oarsman) appears on the east facade.

=== Main Hall ===
The building's main hall was decorated by Henrik Sørensen and Alf Rolfsen. The Hall is 31 metres wide, 39 metres long and around 21 metres high. The floor and parts of the walls are clad in marble. The room has a series of wall paintings depicting Norway and Oslo between the wars and also during occupation. They also depict the growth of commercial activity in the city, including the rise of the labour movement. Various monarchs and the city's patron saint, St. Hallvard are also depicted.

=== City Council Hall ===
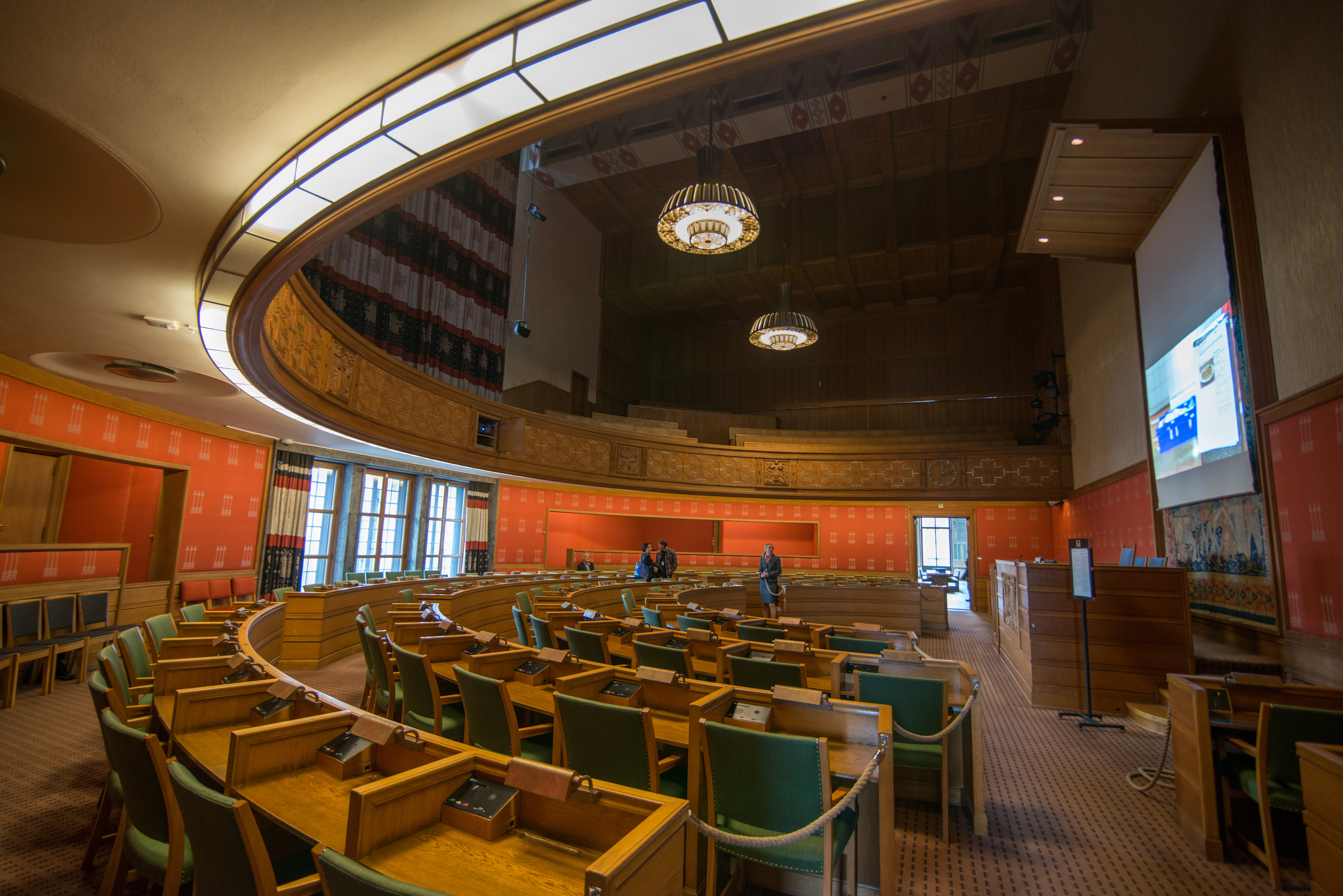
City Council Hall, 2018

The room in which the City Council meets (Bystyresalen) is semi-circular. It is clad in oak and tapestries, the most noticeable of which was designed by Else Poulsson, the niece of the architect. Woven by Else Halling, it depicts St. Hallvard and the seven virtues. The artist hoped the design would remind the city's politicians of ethics and good decisionmaking.

== Nobel Peace Prize ceremony ==
On December 10 (anniversary of Alfred Nobel's death) each year, Oslo City Hall hosts the Nobel Peace Prize ceremony in which the annual laureate gives a lecture and is awarded the medal and diploma. A podium for the laureate and the Nobel Committee is erected in the far end of the hall for each ceremony. The Norwegian royal family and prime minister are attendants.

== Gallery ==
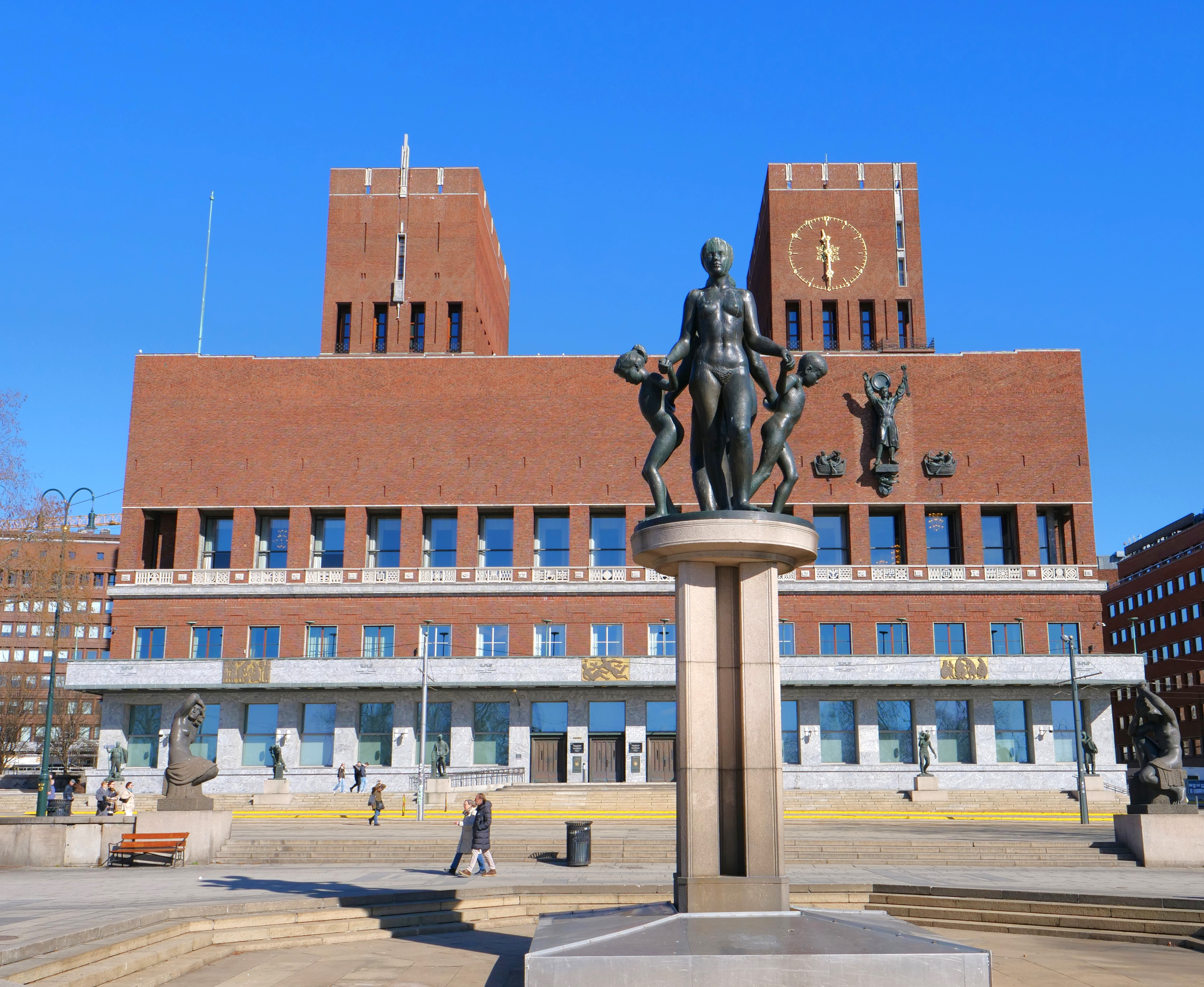
Oslo City Hall, from the Sea Front

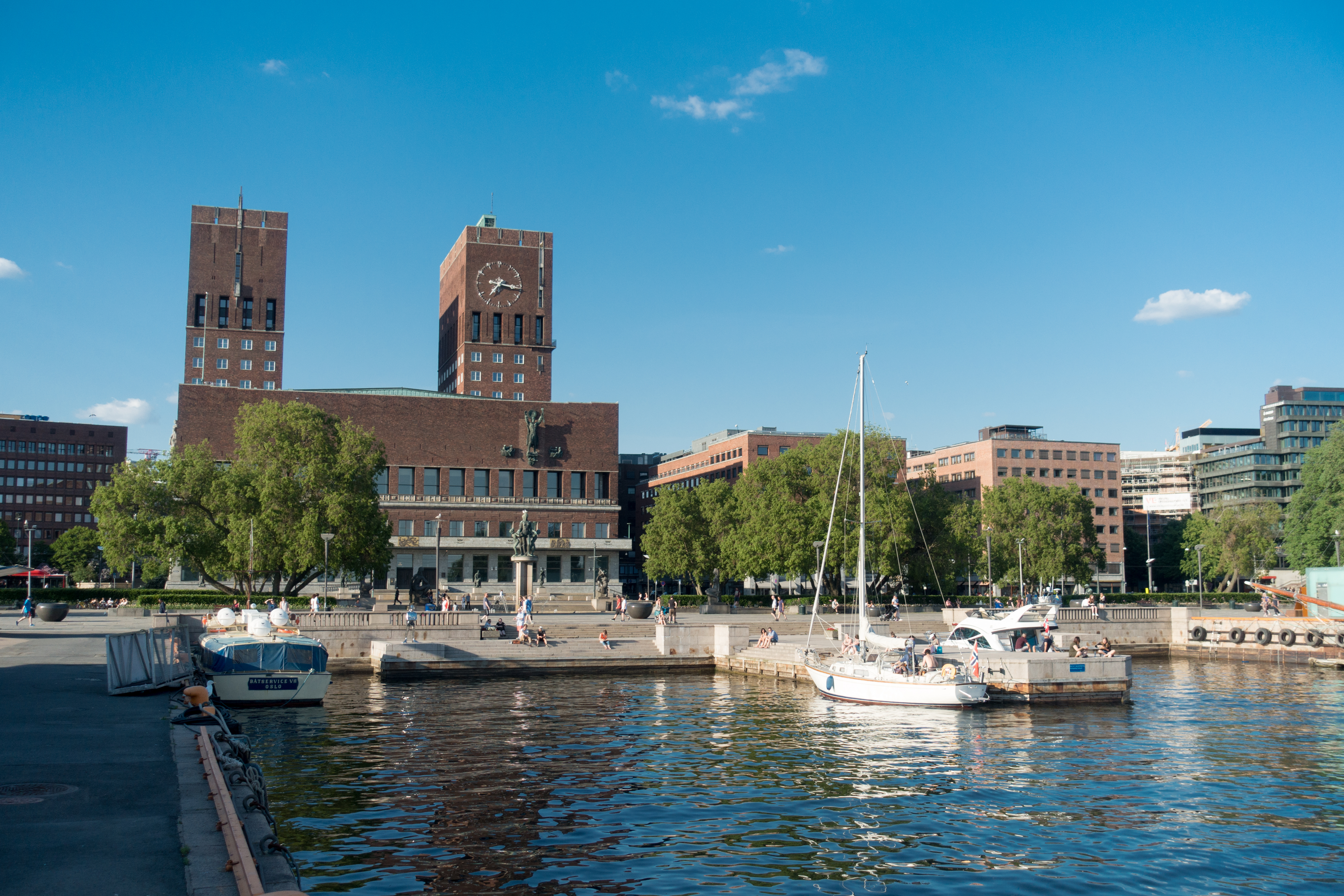

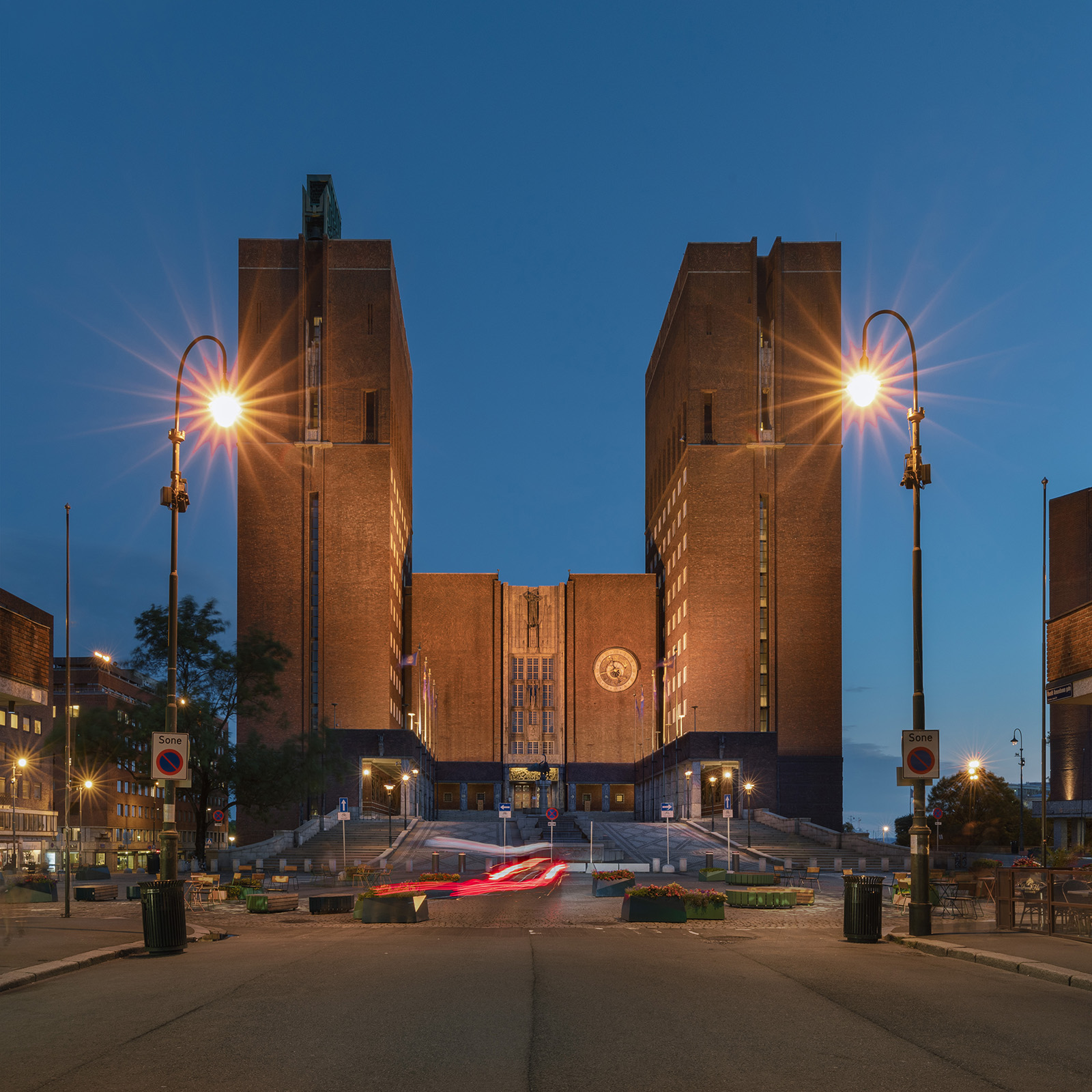
North side with the Astronomical Clock and the main entrance of the City Hall. Carillon over East tower

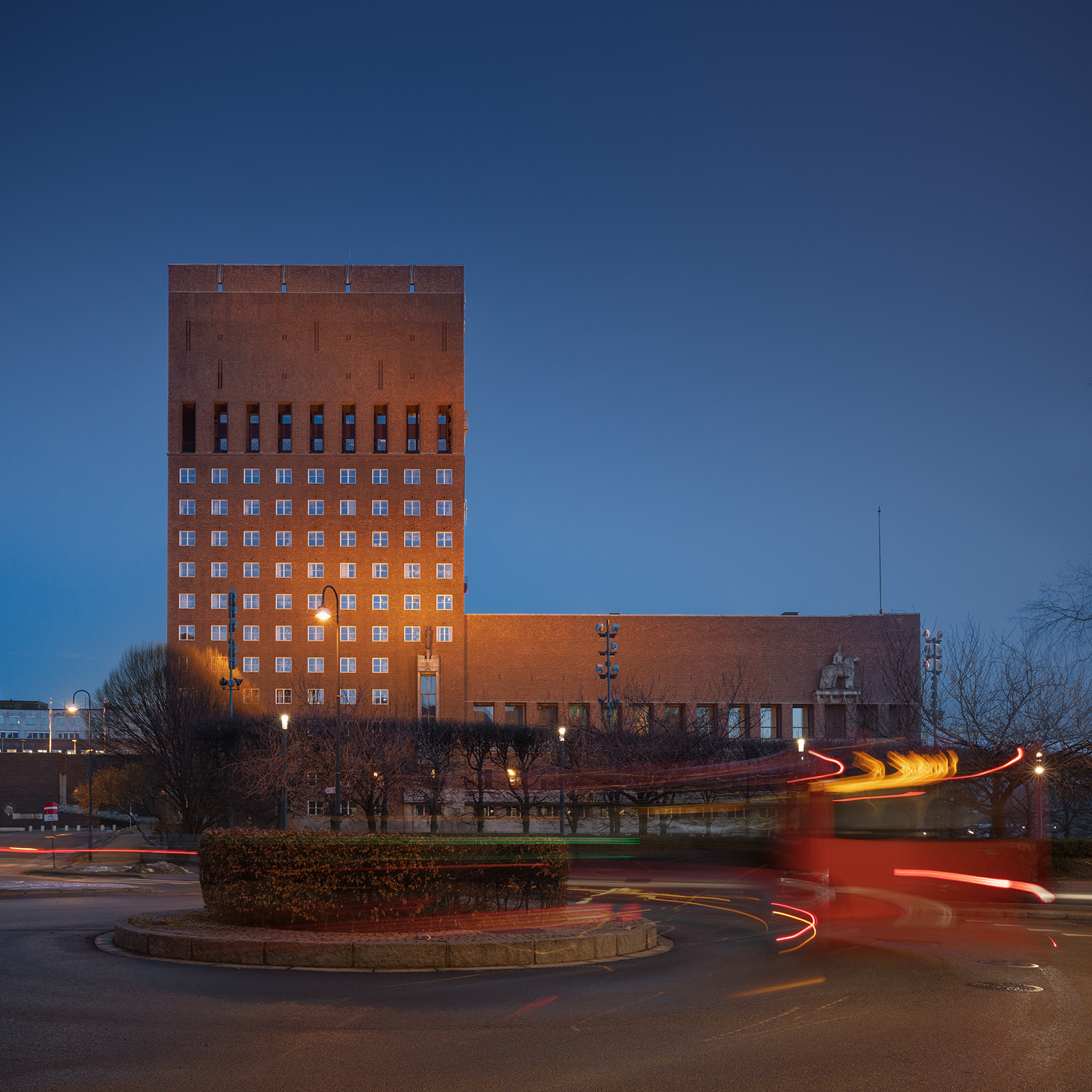

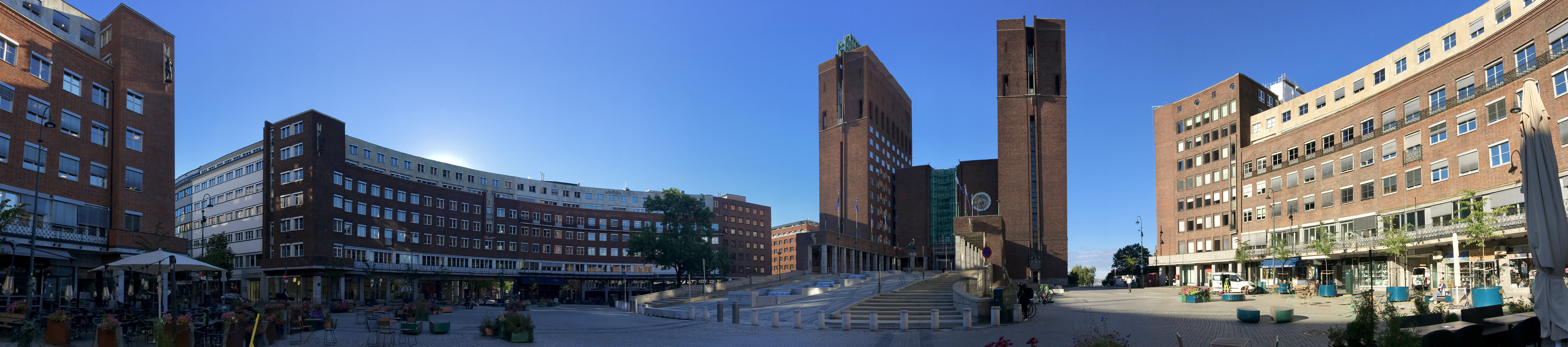

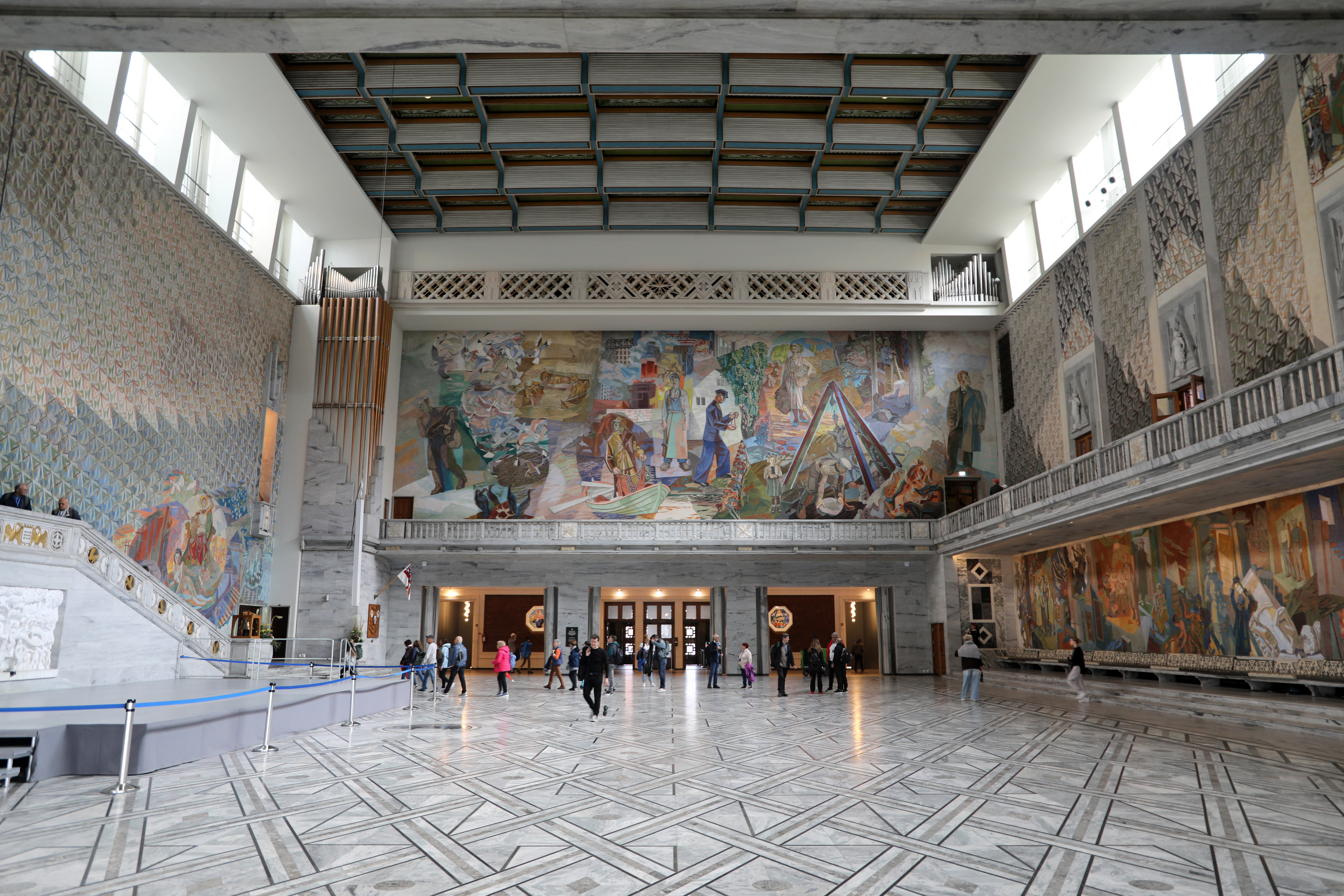
Interior of the main hall, June 2024

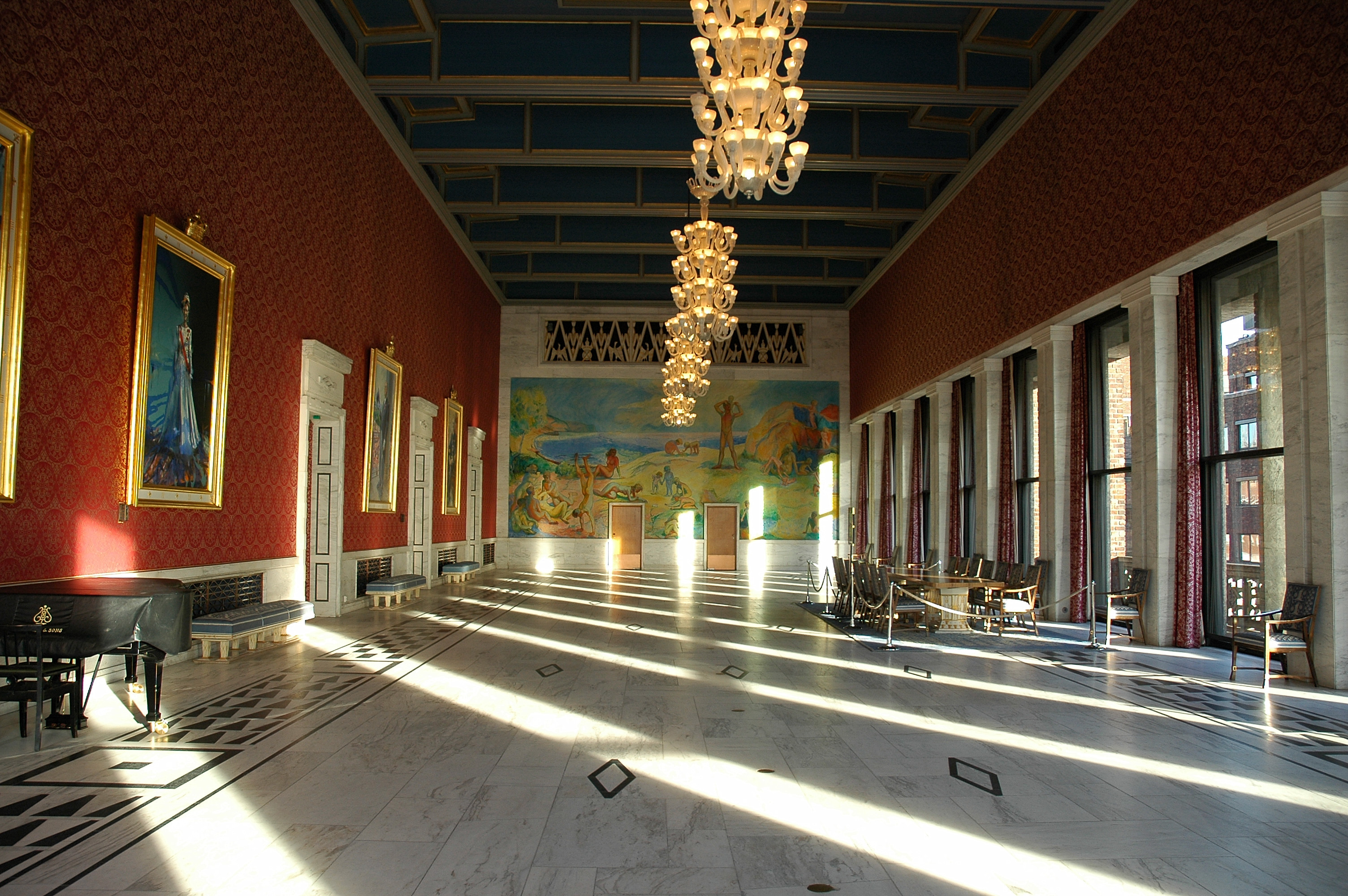
The banquet hall

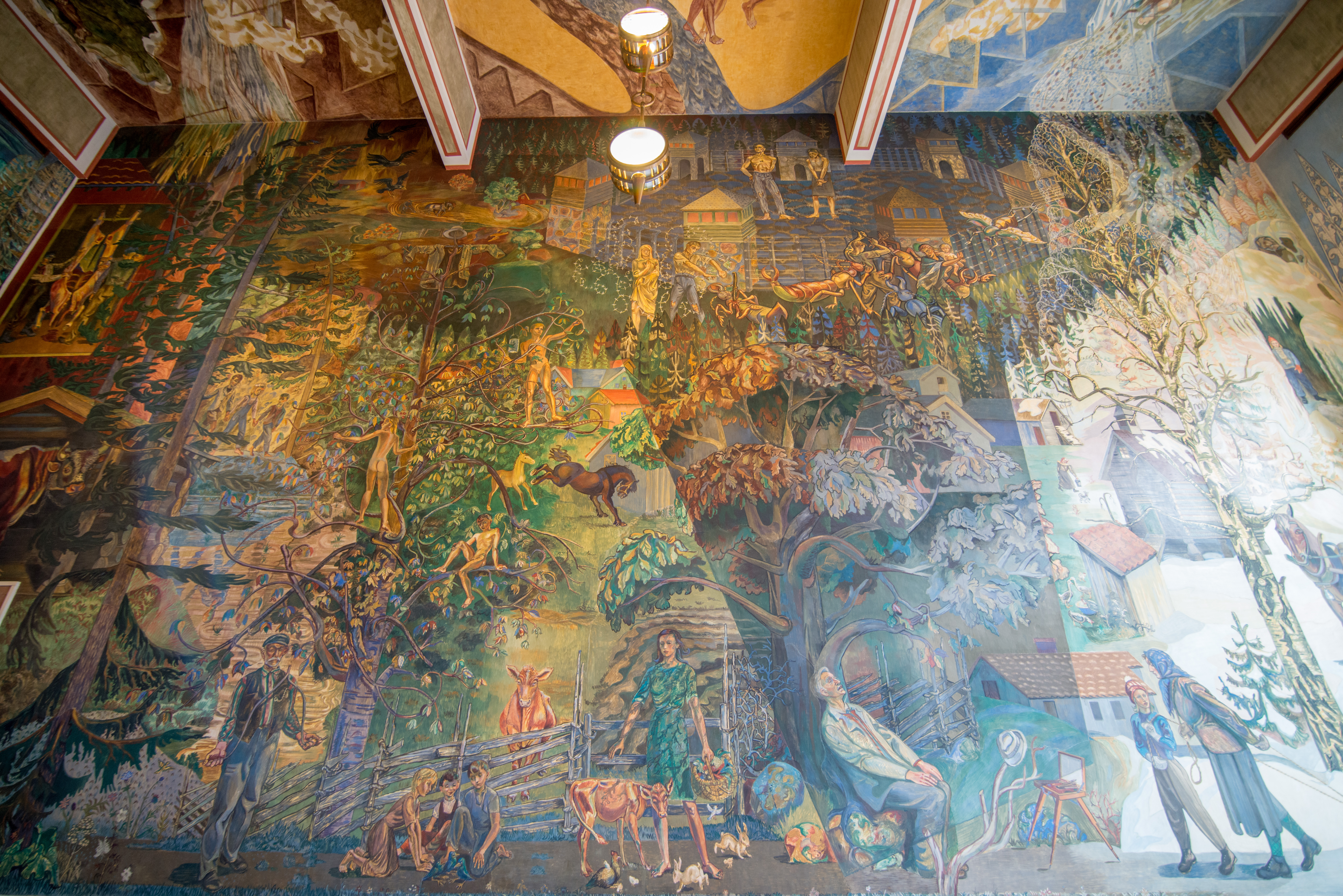

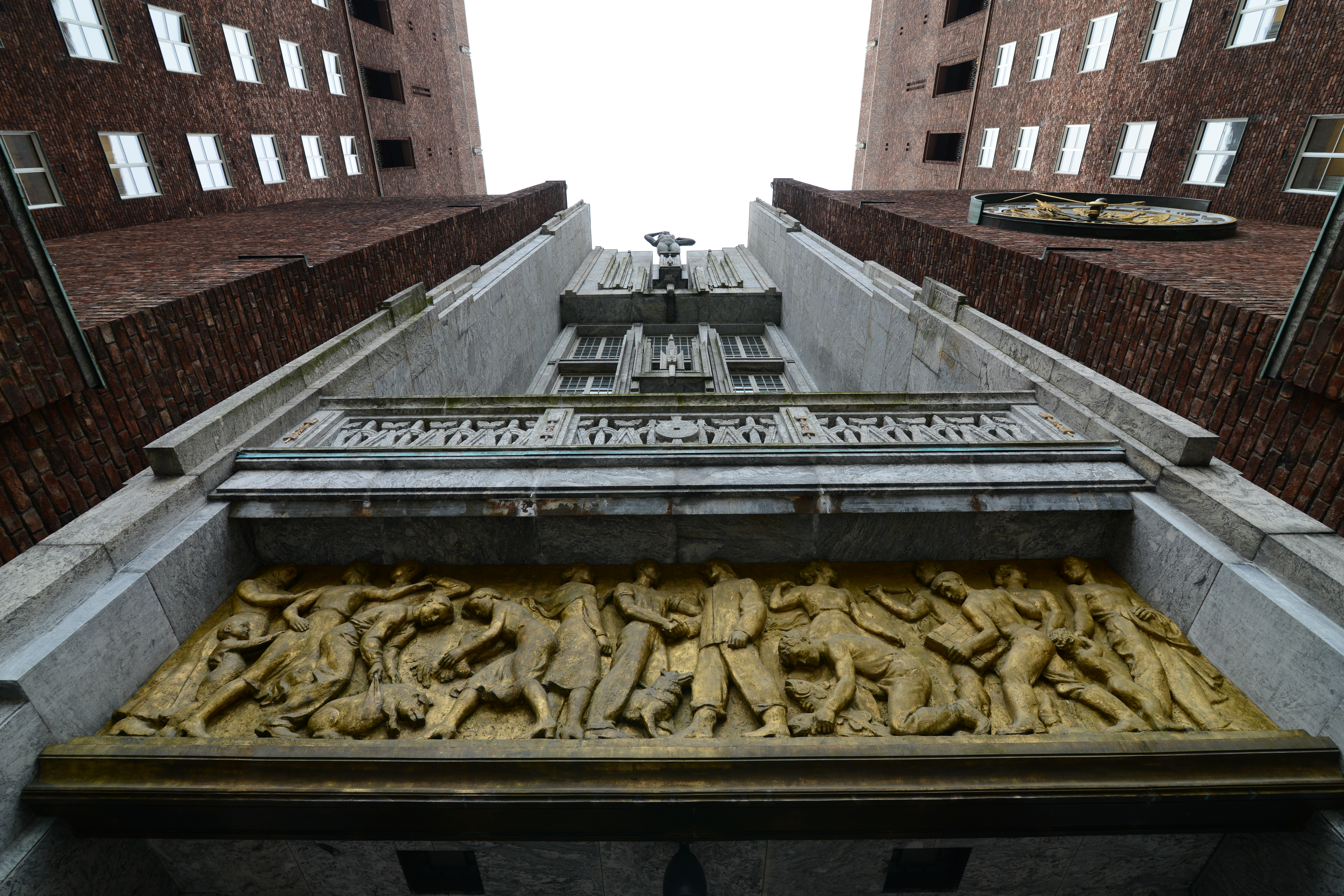

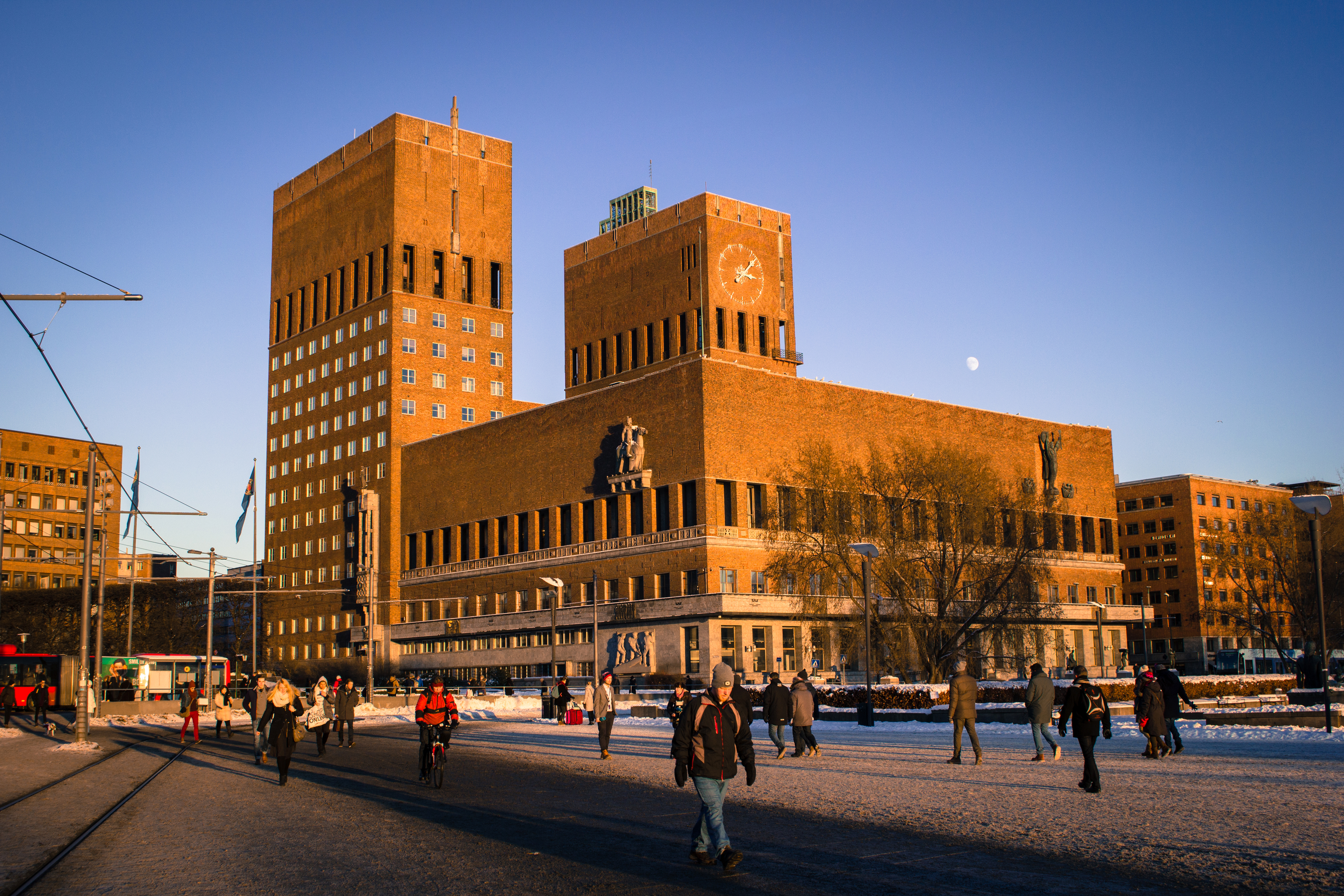
Oslo City Hall, January 2016

== Literature ==
- Grønvold, Ulf; Anker, Nils; Sørensen, Gunnar; Havran, Jiri (2000). The City Hall in Oslo: the nation's gathering place (PDF) (Contents page). Oslo: Aschehoug og Oslo Kommune. ISBN 978-82-03-22553-6.
- Schøning, Trond L. (2001). Det Norske Hus: Oslo Rådhus — en historisk sammenligning [The Norwegian House: Oslo City Hall - a historical comparison] (PDF) (in Norwegian). Bergen, Norway: Master Thesis; Hovedoppgave i kunsthistorie – Universitetet i Bergen. ISBN 82-8088-086-0. Archived from the original (PDF) on January 8, 2023.
- Arneberg, Arnstein; Poulsson, Magnus (2019). "Oslo City Hall: 1918–1950". In Stewart, John (ed.). Twentieth century town halls: architecture of democracy. London, New York: Routledge. pp. 99–106. doi:10.4324/9780429458163-8. ISBN 978-0-429-85691-4. S2CID 188970648.
