= Characters of The Last of Us (TV series) =

Characters from post-apocalyptic drama series

The Last of Us, an American post-apocalyptic drama television series for HBO based on the video game franchise, features an ensemble cast. The first season, based on 2013's The Last of Us, follows Joel (Pedro Pascal) and Ellie (Bella Ramsey) as they travel across the United States. In the second season, based on the first half of 2020's The Last of Us Part II, they have settled in Jackson, Wyoming, with Joel's brother Tommy (Gabriel Luna) and Ellie's friends Dina (Isabela Merced) and Jesse (Young Mazino). After Joel's death, the group travels to Seattle to track down his killer, Abby (Kaitlyn Dever), who is set to be the focus of the third season.

The first season sought high-profile guest stars, such as Anna Torv as Joel's partner Tess, Merle Dandridge and Melanie Lynskey as resistance leaders Marlene and Kathleen, Nick Offerman and Murray Bartlett as survivalists Bill and Frank, Rutina Wesley as Tommy's wife Maria, and Storm Reid as Ellie's best friend Riley. Wesley returned in the second season, which featured guest stars for Jackson-based characters like Robert John Burke as bar owner Seth, Catherine O'Hara as therapist Gail, and Joe Pantoliano as Gail's husband Eugene, as well as Seattle-based characters such as Jeffrey Wright as militia leader Isaac, and Spencer Lord, Tati Gabrielle, Ariela Barer, and Danny Ramirez as Abby's friends Owen, Nora, Mel, and Manny, respectively.

Series creators and writers Craig Mazin and Neil Druckmann felt the television medium allowed an opportunity to explore characters' backstories further than the games, which Druckmann wrote and co-directed. Casting took place virtually through Zoom due to the COVID-19 pandemic, with several high-profile guest stars cast for singular or few episodes. Pascal and Ramsey were cast for their abilities to embody the characters and imitate their relationship. The performances of the main and guest cast throughout the series received critical acclaim for their chemistry and several have received accolades, including two wins and 15 nominations at the Primetime Emmy Awards.

== Conception and casting ==
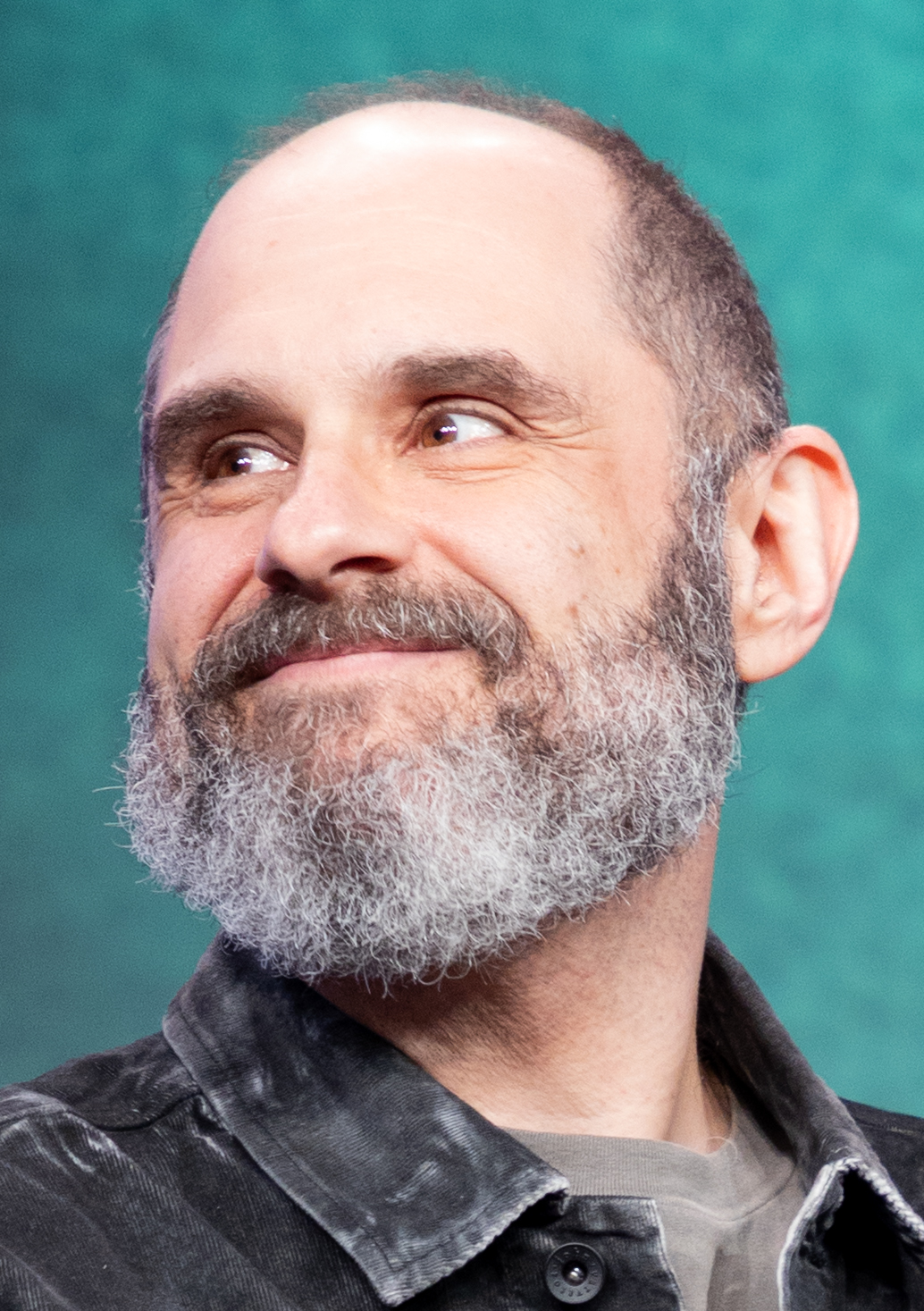
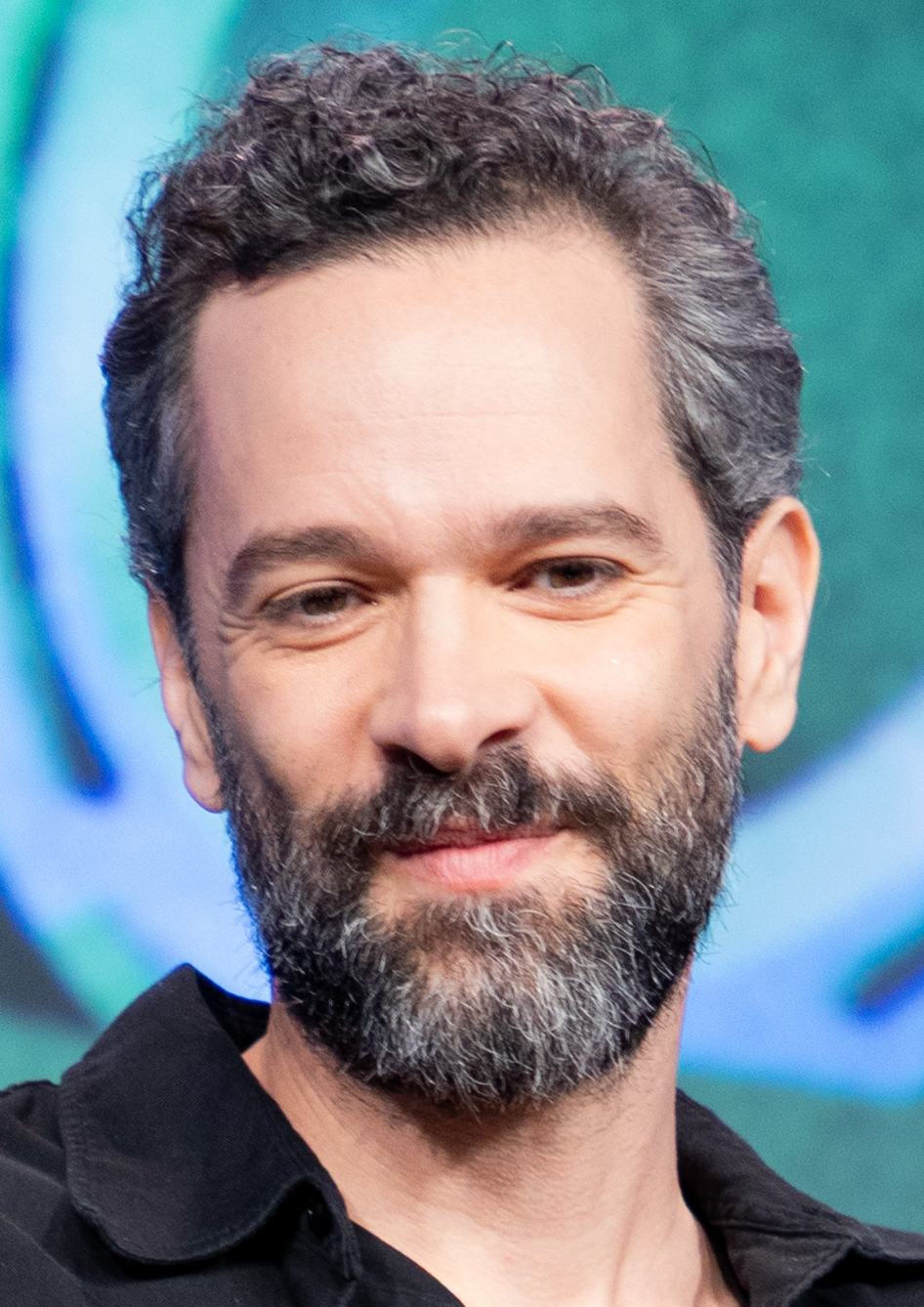
The Last of Us was created by Craig Mazin (left) and Neil Druckmann (right). Druckmann wrote and co-directed the video games.

The Last of Us is written by series creators Craig Mazin and Neil Druckmann; the latter wrote and co-directed the video games on which the series is based. Unlike creating the games, Druckmann felt he was able to "unplug" from the characters when writing the show due to the immersive nature of video games. The writers found the series an opportunity to delve into backstories of characters who the game otherwise ignored, wanting to better understand their motivations.

Druckmann was open to changing any aspects of the games but always wanted a strong reason, ensuring he and Mazin considered the impacts on events later in the narrative. They avoided making "a zombie show", acknowledging the infected creatures were ultimately a vessel through which the characters are pressured to make interesting decisions and reveal their true selves. When casting actors, Mazin is more interested in their "souls" than their physical resemblance to the game versions.

Casting for the first season took place virtually through Zoom due to the COVID-19 pandemic. Casting director Victoria Thomas wanted to honor the game without being limited by it. Mazin and Thomas sought high-profile guest stars; Thomas said many of the actors "don't usually do one-episode guest spots". The producers primarily sought actors who could embody Joel and Ellie individually as well as imitate their relationship.

Casting for the second season was put on hold in May 2023 due to the Writers Guild of America strike; actors had been auditioning with scenes from The Last of Us Part II (2020) due to an absence of scripts. Casting director Mary Vernieu approached Mazin and Druckmann with lists of actors for roles, including many with whom they were unfamiliar. Several roles—such as Dina, Jesse, and Abby—were cast without auditions or tests; the actors were offered the roles. Mazin instead focused on actors fitting their individual roles and had "faith" that they would work with their co-stars. The second season introduces several new characters and spends more time with them. Mazin felt the new actors "fit right in" due to the series's established reputation.

== Overview ==
Character	Portrayed by	Episodes																
Character	Portrayed by	Season 1									Season 2							Season 3
Character	Portrayed by	1	2	3	4	5	6	7	8	9	1	2	3	4	5	6	7	Season 3
Main characters
Joel	Pedro Pascal	Main	Main	Main	Main	Main	Main	Main	Main	Main	Main	Main			(Note: Appears but not credited)	M		
Ellie	Bella Ramsey	Main	Main	Main	Main	Main	Main	Main	Main	Main	Main	Main	Main	Main	Main	Main	Main	✓
Tommy	Gabriel Luna	G					G				Main	Main	Main	(Note: Credited but does not appear)	(Note: Credited but does not appear)	Main	Main	✓
Dina	Isabela Merced										Main	Main	Main	Main	Main	Main	Main	✓
Jesse	Young Mazino										Main	Main	Main		Main	Main	Main	✓
Abby	Kaitlyn Dever										Guest	Guest					G	✓
Owen	Spencer Lord										Guest	Guest					G	✓
Nora	Tati Gabrielle										Guest	Guest			G			✓
Mel	Ariela Barer										Guest	Guest					G	✓
Yara	Michelle Mao																	✓
Lev	Kyriana Kratter																	✓
Secondary characters
Sarah	Nico Parker	G					G											
Marlene	Merle Dandridge	G								G								
Tess	Anna Torv	Guest	Guest	Guest														
Ratna	Christine Hakim		G															
Bill	Nick Offerman			G														
Frank	Murray Bartlett			G														
Henry	Lamar Johnson				Guest	Guest	Guest											
Sam	Keivonn Montreal Woodard				Guest	Guest												
Kathleen	Melanie Lynskey				Guest	Guest												
Perry	Jeffrey Pierce				Guest	Guest												
Maria	Rutina Wesley						G				Guest	Guest	Guest			G		
Marlon	Graham Greene						G											
Florence	Elaine Miles						G											
Riley	Storm Reid							G										
David	Scott Shepherd								G									
James	Troy Baker								G									
Anna	Ashley Johnson									G								
Seth	Robert John Burke										Guest	Guest	Guest			G		
Manny	Danny Ramirez										Guest	Guest	Guest				G	
Manny	Jorge Lendeborg Jr.																	✓
Kat	Noah Lamanna										G					CS		
Gail	Catherine O'Hara										G		G			G		
Isaac	Jeffrey Wright													G			G	✓
Janowicz	Josh Peck													G				
Javier	Tony Dalton															G		
Eugene	Joe Pantoliano															G		

== Main characters ==
=== Joel ===
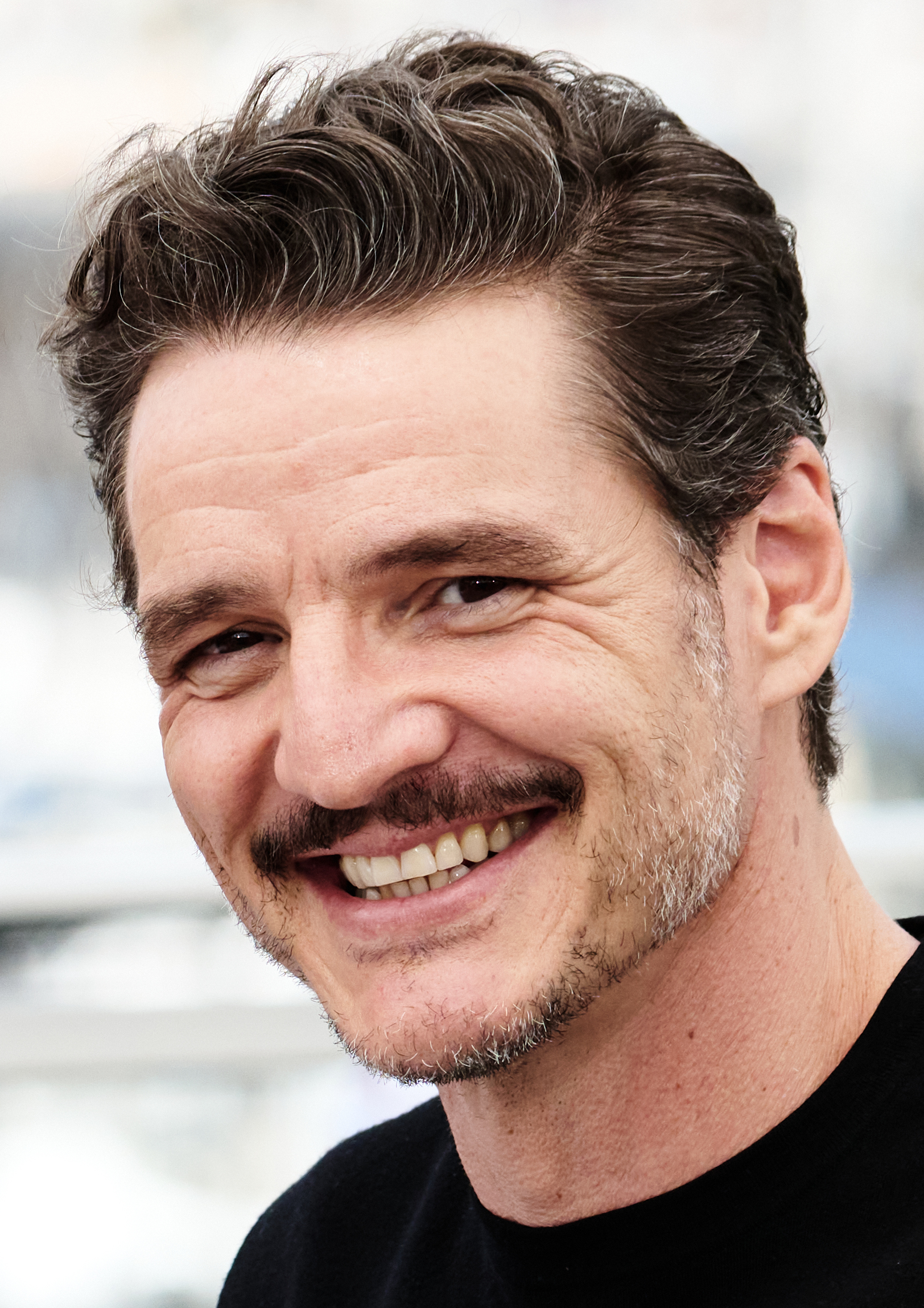
Pedro Pascal portrays Joel.

Joel Miller (Pedro Pascal) is a hardened middle-aged survivor who is tormented by the trauma of his past. He is tasked with smuggling a young girl, Ellie, out of a quarantine zone and across the United States. Unlike in the games, which required Joel (as the player character) to perform near-superhuman actions for the player to progress, he is more vulnerable in the series—he is hard of hearing in one ear due to a gunshot and his knees ache when he stands. Andrew Diaz portrays a young Joel in "The Price".

Pascal's casting was announced on February 10, 2021. Earlier that day, it was reported Mahershala Ali was offered the role of Joel after Matthew McConaughey turned it down; The Hollywood Reporter noted Ali "did circle a role" in the show, but a deal was never formed. Pascal became available for a new series after the release of the second season of The Mandalorian, attracting several offers for projects from large networks, of which he chose The Last of Us, partly to work with Mazin. Mazin and Druckmann had been considering Pascal for some time. He accepted the role within 24 hours; The Mandalorian producers gave Pascal permission to work on the series. He reportedly earned US$600,000 per episode for the first season, making him one of the highest-paid American television stars.

Pascal was chosen for his ability to portray a tough, tortured, and vulnerable character who suppresses his emotions until necessary. A non-gamer, Pascal watched his nephew play the beginning of the first game because he lacked the skill to play it himself; he found Joel to be "so impressive" but was concerned about imitating the games too closely, instead choosing to "create a healthy distance" and allow the showrunners to decide the characterization. Pascal based Joel's voice on his own experiences growing up in San Antonio, Texas, paring it back from the Southern accent used in the game.

Empire's John Nugent and /Film's Valerie Ettenhofer referred to Pascal's performance as the best of his career, citing his ability to portray nuance and rare vulnerability. TechRadar's Axel Metz described him as the "perfect real-world manifestation" of Joel. GameSpot's Mark Delaney said Pascal's performance in the first episode made him cry twice and lauded his ability to portray different sides of Joel; Push Square's Aaron Bayne found Pascal's performance reflected Joel's torment without speaking, In the fourth episode, The A.V. Club's David Cote enjoyed Pascal's warmth and humor, particularly in scenes in which he teaches Ellie; Den of Geek's Bernard Boo considered the sixth episode among the best performances of Pascal's career; TVLine named Pascal the Performer of the Week, citing his emotions and physicality, and Push Square's Bayne opined he balanced "the stoic masculinity with tender vulnerability". Several reviewers lauded Pascal's range of demonstrating terror, fragility, and rage in the ninth episode. For his role, Pascal won Best Hero at the MTV Movie & TV Awards, and was nominated at several ceremonies, including the Golden Globe Awards and two Primetime Emmy Awards.

Pascal began the second season's production tired and injured after working on Gladiator II (2024), which Mazin felt was appropriate for Joel's state of mind. Pascal, who grew close with Ramsey during the first season, considered their separation "cruel" for the second, though he considered it a realistic parental fissure. Pascal found Joel's "stubborn paralysis" fueled by fear of losing Ellie forced him to become vulnerable, which helped him address exhaustion in his own life. Critics lauded Pascal's second-season performance for bringing warmth, charisma, and hardiness to Joel; Collider's Ross Bonaime called his performance his career-best and Inverse's Valerie Ettenhofer felt Pascal was able to fall "effortlessly back into the performance that gives the series its beating, broken heart". The Hollywood Reporter's Angie Han found his performance shone through both his words and the unspoken emotions in his eyes. His chemistry with Ramsey was similarly praised; Rolling Stone's Alan Sepinwall found some episodes weaker for their absence. Pascal was nominated for Best Actor in a Drama Series at the 5th Astra TV Awards.

=== Ellie ===
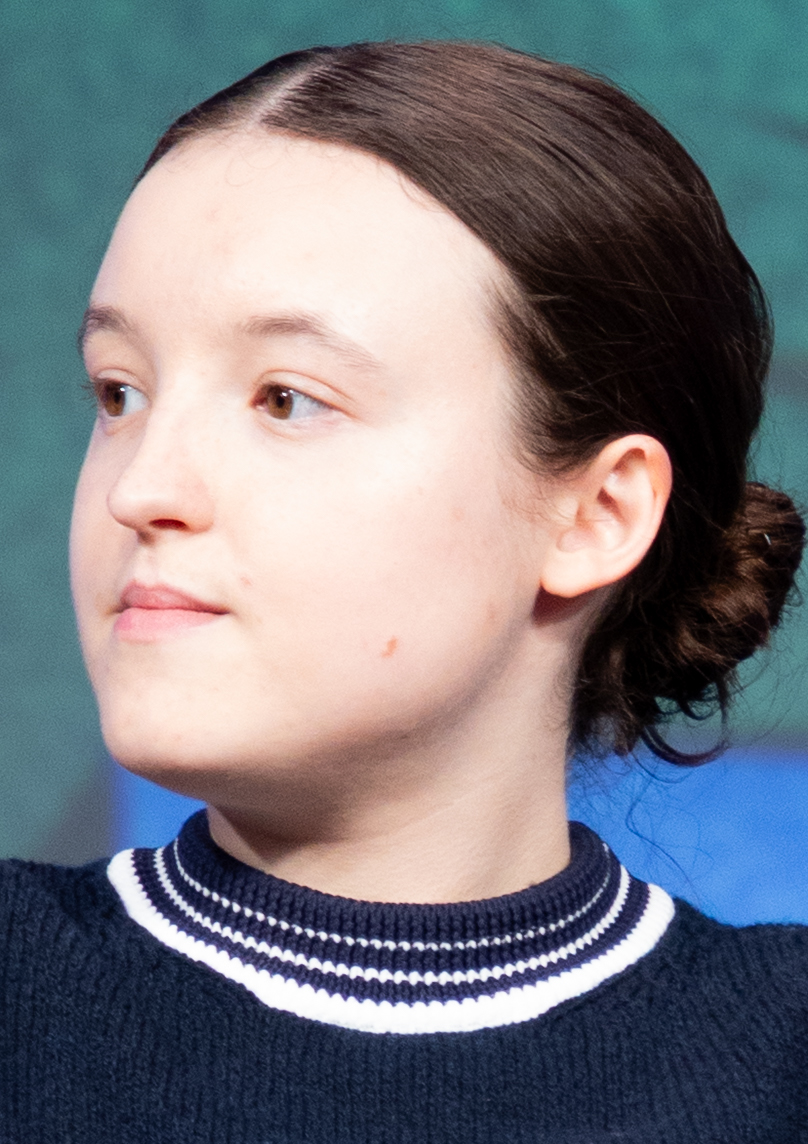
Bella Ramsey portrays Ellie.

Ellie (Bella Ramsey) is a teenage girl who displays much defiance and anger but has a private need for kinship and belonging. 14-years-old in the first season, she has not lost her playfulness, bonding easily with children, and has a fondness for puns. She is immune to the Cordyceps infection and may be the key to creating a vaccine. In keeping with the games, she is a lesbian. In the second season, Ellie, now 19, has become tougher, like Joel, but maintains her humor.

Ramsey's casting was announced on February 10, 2021. Any actors considered for Ellie for the canceled film adaptation had aged out of consideration, resulting in a reset of candidates. Around 105 actors had been considered; the producers sought a performer who could portray a resourceful, quirky, and potentially violent character. Ramsey secured the role within a month of their audition. They were aware of the game before auditioning, but were encouraged not to play it to avoid replicating the original performance, instead watching some gameplay on YouTube to "get a sense of it"; they still had not played it after filming the series. They wanted their performance to be reminiscent of the games without copying them. Ramsey, who is English, learned an American accent for the role, and had to cut off over 15 inches of hair. They wore a chest binder for 90 percent of production for better focus on set.

Kotaku Australia's David Smith called Ramsey "perhaps the pilot's greatest triumph", especially in their scenes with Pascal. By the fourth episode, Push Square's Bayne felt Ramsey's performance would win over viewers who doubted their casting, lauding their portrayal of both trauma and humor. Total Film's Bradley Russell found their fifth-episode performance worthy of awards consideration, and Den of Geek's Bernard Boo thought the sixth featured "possibly the best performances of [their] career". IGN's Simon Cardy praised their ability to switch between emotion and comedy. Bleeding Cool's Tom Chang called Ramsey's seventh-episode performance in "award-worthy" and their strongest to date. In the eighth, Den of Geek's Boo lauded Ramsey's ability to portray toughness while maintaining vulnerability, and The Washington Post's Gene Park wrote their performance "should finally erase" any remaining doubts. The New York Times's Noel Murray commended Ramsey's unique portrayal of Ellie's emotional shutdown in the ninth episode, and The Atlantic's David Sims called them "dead on in conveying Ellie's suspicion" in the final scenes. Ramsey received several nominations, including at the Golden Globes and two Emmy Awards.

Ramsey found Ellie "easily accessible" for the second season as they had lived with the character for years. They chose to live alone during second-season filming, reflective of Ellie's growing independence. Mazin regularly checked in due to the stunt work's intensity; Ramsey was more concerned about emotional scenes, for which they prepared by remaining "as light as energetic as possible". They found the second season "a lonelier experience" due to their separation from Pascal and faced difficulty during argumentative scenes due to their own close relationship with their father. They were saddened by Pascal's departure but felt prepared to step up as the primary lead actor and set the tone. Mazin found Ellie's combat encounters more interesting due to Ramsey's size, exploring techniques used by shorter people against larger enemies. Ramsey trained in boxing, jiu-jitsu, and weight training for two months before filming, preparing with the stunt team in London. They were concerned their body type did not match Ellie's in the game, particularly in their lack of muscle definition, but Mazin wanted Ellie's strength to be conveyed more in her posture and confidence; he felt he had witnessed the growth in Ramsey's personality and emotional maturity between seasons, reflected in the series.

Many critics considered the second season Ramsey's standout; Vulture's Kathryn VanArendonk called them the season's "magnetic presence". Their performance was praised for developing Ellie into a traumatized young adult while maintaining emotional immaturity and playfulness. The Hollywood Reporter's Han felt they surpassed their first-season performance through their ability to demonstrate emotions through simple expressions. Radio Times's Louise Griffin lauded Ramsey's chemistry with all of their screen partners, including Pascal. Los Angeles Times's Mary McNamara felt Ramsey's younger appearance worked to the character's advantage, though IGN's Cardy thought it made the time jump less believable. Ramsey was nominated for Best Actress in a Drama Series at the 5th Astra TV Awards.

=== Tommy ===
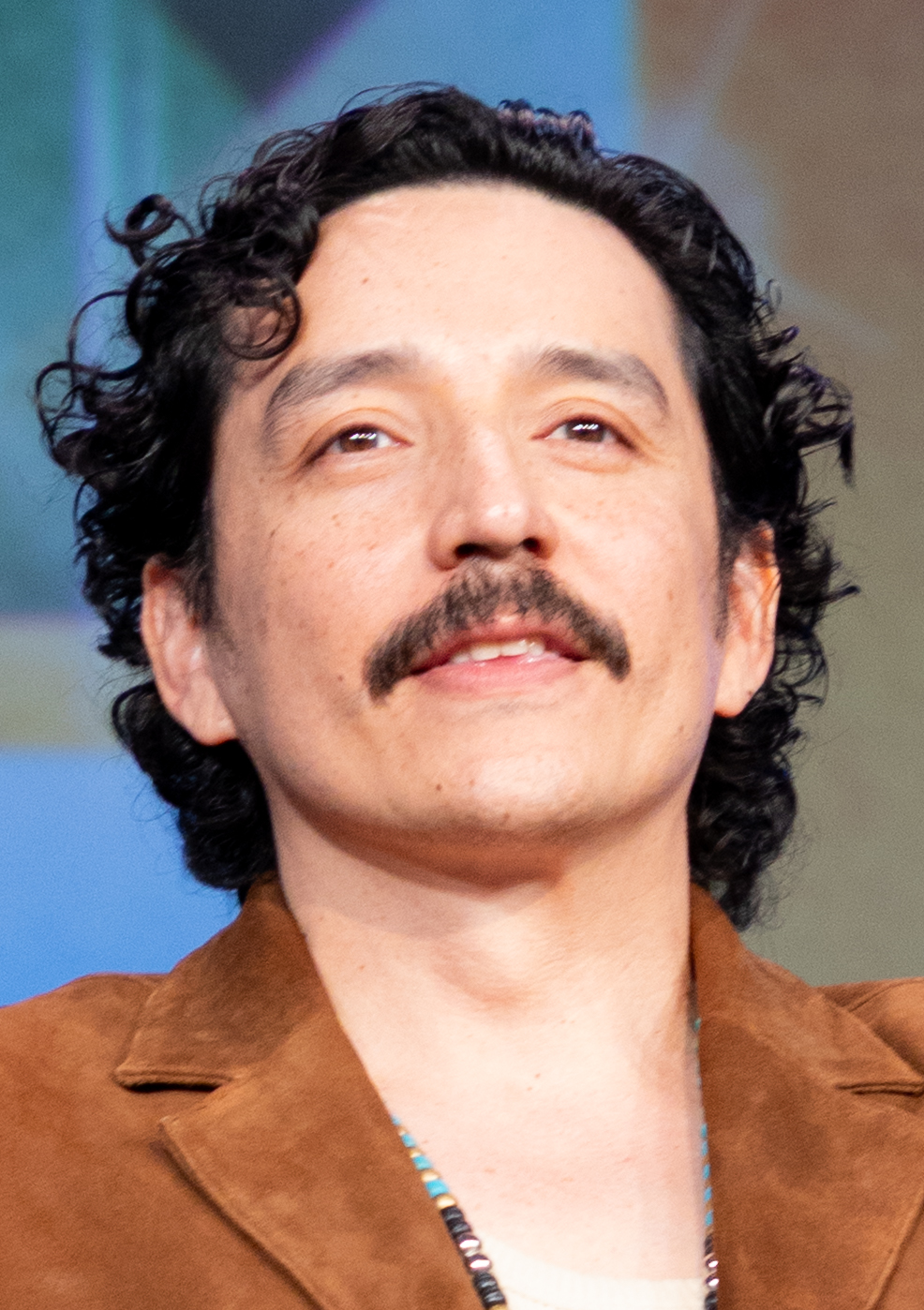
Gabriel Luna portrays Tommy.

Tommy Miller (Gabriel Luna) is Joel's younger brother who maintains idealism in his hope for a better world. He is a veteran of Operation Desert Storm. Before the outbreak in 2003, Tommy worked as a contractor with Joel. After a soldier shoots at Joel and Sarah, Tommy kills the soldier and watches Sarah die in Joel's arms. In 2023, Tommy and Joel reunite in Jackson, Wyoming. Joel tries to convince Tommy to join him and Ellie to Colorado; Tommy declines as Maria is pregnant. Joel later confides in Tommy about Ellie's immunity and his declining mental state, and asks Tommy to take Ellie to the Fireflies as he fears he cannot keep her safe; he agrees to take her the following morning. In the morning, Joel changes his mind, and he and Ellie leave Jackson on horseback while Tommy remains. In the second season, Tommy and Maria have a son named Benjamin, nicknamed "Benji" (played by Ezra Agbonkhese). David Miranda portrays young Tommy in "The Price".

Luna's casting as Tommy was announced on April 15, 2021. About a month after the casting of Pascal and Ramsey, Luna was asked to submit an audition tape; he performed one scene from the game and one from the first episode. He was familiar with the work of Mazin and executive producer Carolyn Strauss, and had previously worked with HBO on True Detective. Six days after submitting his tape, he was offered the role by Mazin, Strauss, and Druckmann; according to Luna, they instantly knew he was "the one". He was enthusiastic for the role, having lived in Austin around the same time as the show's setting. Luna was aware of the games but had not played them; he was given a PlayStation 5 during production to play them as research, doing so over two-and-a-half months.

Luna provided input for Tommy's costume, such as the Texan plant Indian paintbrush on his boots and his First Nations-crafted belt buckle, which he felt Tommy "found and treasured because it was just so well-made". Luna believed Tommy desires a family like his brother's and a world in which people can return to peaceful living. He could relate to Joel's actions as an older brother, particularly as he had been the patriarch of his own family alongside his single mother. Luna partly took inspiration from Texans such as Willie Nelson and Kris Kristofferson, particularly Kristofferson for his relaxed attitude. For the second season, Luna found Tommy's fatherhood gave him purpose and more reason to keep Jackson safe. He and Pascal both felt their familiarity with each other strengthened Tommy and Joel's relationship, especially in the second season. As one of the few returning actors for the second season, Luna wanted to "maintain the culture of the show, which is one of love". He began working out for the second season but Mazin told him Tommy's age meant he was "supposed to be out of shape".

Push Square's Bayne wrote Luna flawlessly "slips into the role" with little screen time. Critics enjoyed the chemistry between Pascal and Luna in the sixth episode, and Bayne considered Luna's performance "a wonderful counter to Joel", citing the familial bond and underlying tension. IGN's Cardy deemed Luna the "MVP" of the second season's early episodes. He was nominated for Best Supporting Drama Actor at the Imagen Awards for the first two seasons, winning for the second. Luna found the third season's perspective shift interesting as Tommy "becomes kind of like the boogeyman to these other people" after being a hero for the first two seasons.

=== Dina ===
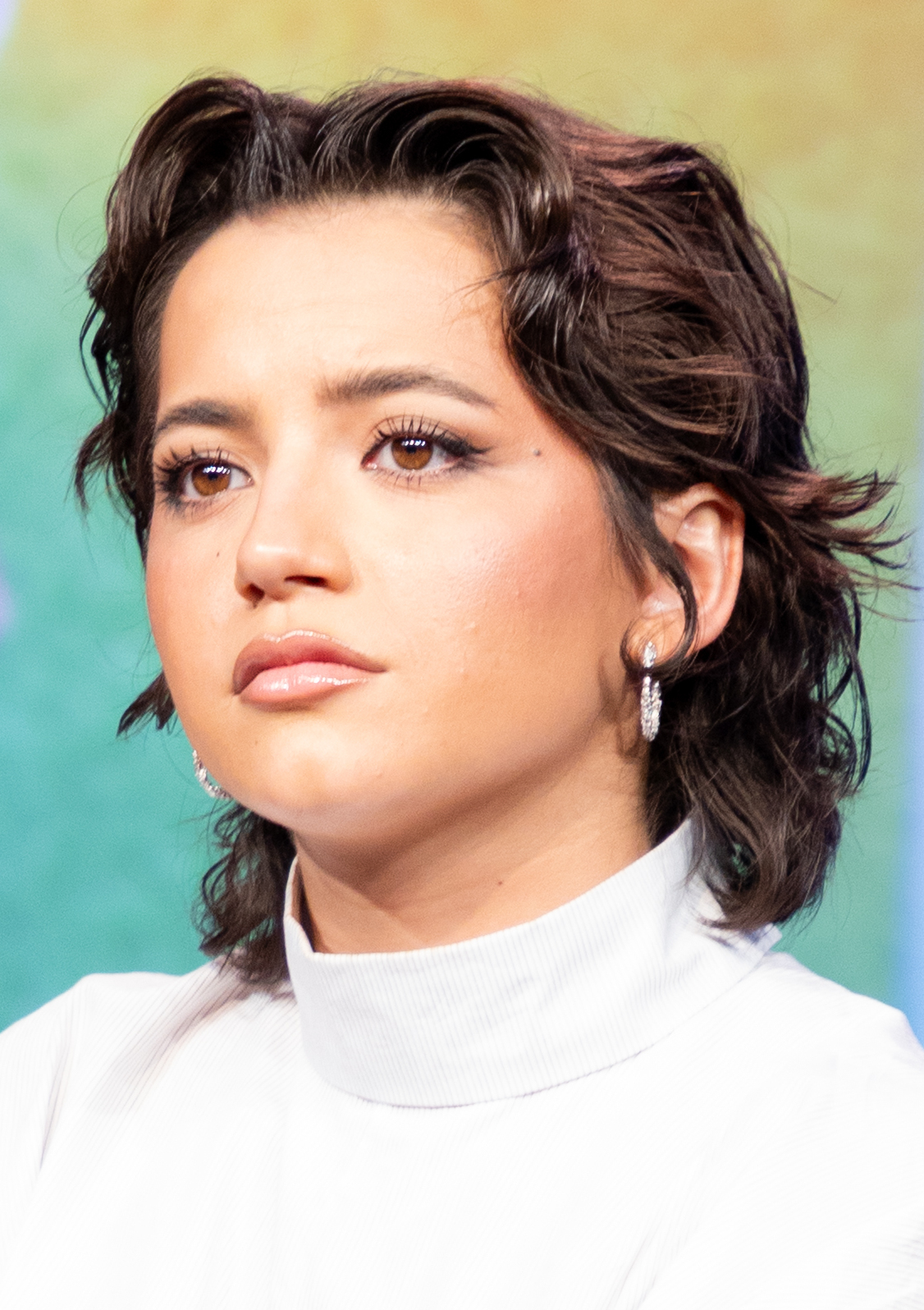
Isabela Merced portrays Dina.

Dina (Isabela Merced) is Ellie's romantic interest and Jesse's ex. She is a freewheeling spirit with a loyalty towards Ellie, which is challenged by the world's brutality. While Dina serves as a non-playable ally in the game, the lack of playability in the series forced the writers to consider her role, positioning her to address the flaws in Ellie's personality. Casting director Mary Vernieu recommended Merced to Mazin and Druckmann; her casting was announced on January 11, 2024. Before being cast, Merced had watched the first season but not played the games; Mazin and Druckmann recommended that she watch gameplay of Part II on YouTube, but she opted to play it instead, doing so in a weekend before meeting the writers, which she felt made her more familiar with sets during production. She saw Shannon Woodward's performance in the game as the foundation for the role.

Merced felt Dina's light and playful personality matched her own. She was inspired by her own mother's maternal behaviors, particularly being "very in touch with her emotions". Merced had little time to socialize with Ramsey before production but immediately considered their chemistry "palpable"; she credits Ramsey for making her feel comfortable and allowing their chemistry to "thrive". She made a playlist for Dina and Ellie, often playing Adrianne Lenker's song "Zombie Girl" on set to establish the tone of their relationship; Merced felt the relationship allowed Ellie to access joy and Dina to imagine her future. Merced found Joel a "fun uncle" figure to Dina, noting their mutual confidence based on their shared love for Ellie. She filmed the second season while promoting the 2024 films Madame Web, Turtles All the Way Down, and Alien: Romulus and while filming Superman (2025), which she found difficult but worthwhile as a fan of the genres. At Mazin's approval, Merced joined visual effects meetings and editing sessions for several days.

Many reviewers considered Merced the second season's highlight for her compassion and humor; Rolling Stone's Sepinwall found her compelling despite the expectations set by the game, and /Film's Matahi called her "a top contender for the best scene-stealing performance of the season". RogerEbert.com's Brian Tallerico described her as "a ray of light in a show surrounded by darkness" and lauded Merced's decision to give Dina her own strong personality instead of playing her as Ellie's counterpart. Her chemistry with Ramsey was similarly praised; Total Film's Lauren Milici called them "the heart of season 2", and Inverse's Valerie Ettenhofer found their scenes recaptured the first season's magic. The Hollywood Reporter's Han wrote that "you can practically feel the butterflies in your own stomach" when watching them together. Merced won Best Supporting Actress in a Drama Series at the 5th Astra TV Awards, and received the Next Generation Impact Award at the NHMC Impact Awards Gala for her roles in The Last of Us and Superman.

=== Jesse ===
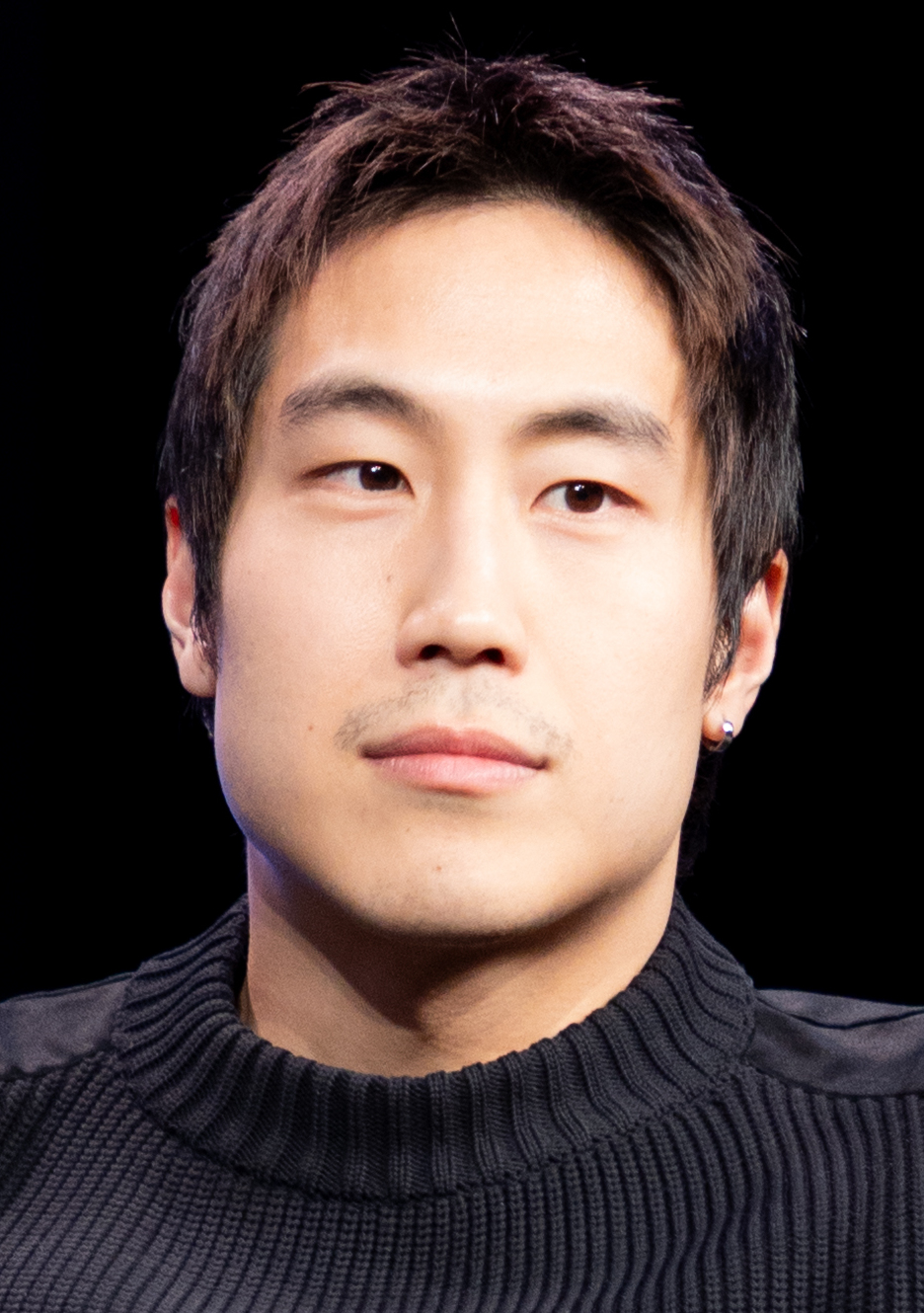
Young Mazino portrays Jesse.

Jesse (Young Mazino) is an important member of his community whose selflessness sometimes comes at a cost. Having lost everything prior to joining Jackson, he values its sense of community and works hard to ensure it is not lost. Mazino's casting was announced on January 10, 2024. He had watched a playthrough of the first game before watching the first season, and played the second game before meeting with Mazin and Druckmann following the writers' and actors' strikes; he stopped after Jesse's death in the game. He felt his performance in Beef (2023) secured him the role, allowing him to have "a conversation more than an audition process". Mazino drew inspiration from his own father's reliability and dependability in his characterization of Jesse. His preparation for production included horse-riding at Danny Virtue's ranch, and firearm training. He and Ramsey bonded before production by riding a seaplane, and he felt the writing informed the remainder of his relationships with other cast members, while he and Merced bonded over their shared fear of joining an established series.

Mazino thought Jesse was jealous of Ellie's precocious nature; unaware of her immunity, he notices that she acts casual about serious events, admiring the lengths to which she goes to avenge her loved ones. He chose to perform Jesse's death stunts himself, including in shots where it was not necessary, though found it exhausting by the "15th, 20th" takes. When the scene was reshot, Mazino was given the option to be replaced by a stunt double but chose to attend as he felt Ellie seeing Jesse's lifeless body is "a catastrophic moment". He had clay prosthetics on his face in the scene. The writers did not consider alternatives to Jesse's death and prepared Mazino for the scene early in the season's production. Mazino found its abrupt nature indicative of the world's brutality and did not wish to change it, considering it reflective of the notion of sonder in the realization that each individual has their own complex life and death.

IGN's Cardy lauded Mazino's performance, citing the maturity with which Jesse addresses Ellie, and /Film's Mathai called him "perfectly-cast". Some critics called Jesse's appearance in "Feel Her Love" a contrived deus ex machina, and Kotaku's Kenneth Shepard felt his personality being angstier than his game counterpart was to make Ellie's actions more palatable. CBR's Katie Doll called Mazino "such a great addition to the cast", particularly in the second-season finale. He received an honorable mention for Outstanding Supporting Performance from Gold House's Gold List in Television.

=== Abby ===
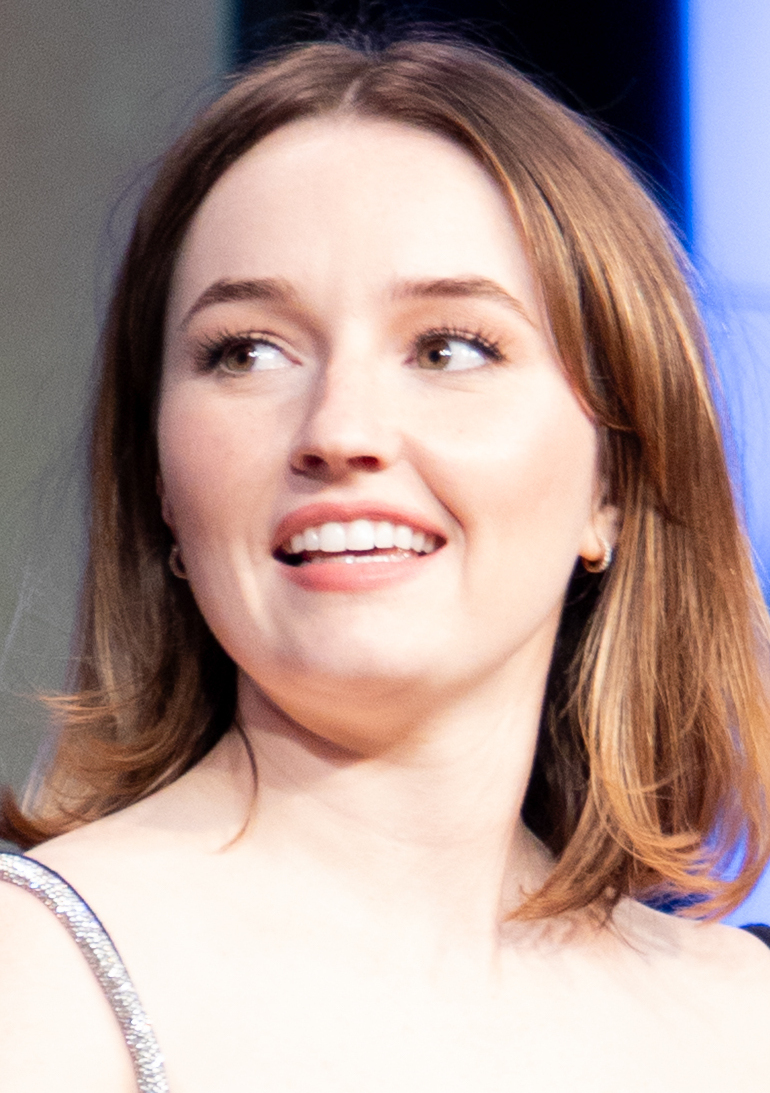
Kaitlyn Dever portrays Abby.

Abby (Kaitlyn Dever) is a soldier with the Washington Liberation Front (WLF). A former Firefly from Salt Lake City, she seeks vengeance for the death of her father—killed by Joel in the first season—and subsequently has her worldview challenged. The production team wanted to start the second season's casting with Abby; casting for the role began before the strike, and Dever became the frontrunner after the strike ended in November, following the response to her performance in No One Will Save You (2023). She previously appeared in Naughty Dog's Uncharted 4: A Thief's End (2016), and was considered to play Ellie in the abandoned film adaptation of The Last of Us around the time, having attended a table read for the role and visited Naughty Dog during development of Part II; Mazin later suggested her as Abby. He sought an actor who could approach the character as both a hero viewers love and a villain they despise. Dever was offered the role at Vernieu's office in 2023, when Mazin and Druckmann outlined their plans for the character.

Dever's casting was announced on January 9, 2024. She was aware of Abby's divisiveness among players of the game but chose to approach the character "with fresh eyes", not letting it impact her decisions. She played through the first game several times with her father and part of the second; months before Dever met the showrunners, her father expressed interest in her playing Abby. On Druckmann's recommendation, she did not finish Part II or speak with Laura Bailey, who played Abby in the game. She sought to "do the character justice" while bringing her "own sort of energy" to the role, using Bailey's performance as inspiration while feeling excited to add her own take, wanting to explore Abby's grief, motivations, and empathy. Dever considered Abby the most rageful character she had ever portrayed, prompting her to go "to darker places that [she] had never gone before" and learning more about herself. She thought Abby was similar to most other characters in the series in her emotional journey.

Dever's mother died shortly before production, and her first day on set was three days after the funeral. Her mother's excitement for the role inspired her to continue; Dever felt she channeled her mother's energy in pushing through the work and exaggerated the pain and anger of her own life into Abby. Dever found the experience of keeping secrets to avoid spoilers new and nerve-wracking. Abby is less muscular in the series than the game, which the writers attributed to the former focusing more on drama than action, with less violence. Druckmann also felt it was "not worth passing ... up" an opportunity to work with Dever to continue searching for actors who matched Abby's physicality. Mazin felt the character was more physically vulnerable but spiritually stronger in the series. Dever prepared for production by training to become stronger. She lowered her voice while performing to reflect Abby's weathered and defensive nature. The second-season finale ends with a shift to Abby's perspective, and the third season is set to follow her story with Dever in a leading role. She was told of the shift when she got the role.

TVLine's Dave Nemetz considered Dever the second season's highlight. Her performance was lauded for her portrayal of grief, rage, and hatred; TheWrap's Chase Hutchinson felt her eyes effectively conveyed her agony. The Telegraph's Ed Power thought Dever's performance outshone all others', and IGN's Cardy opined that she upstaged Ramsey's Ellie. /Film's Jeremy Mathai wrote that it "takes all of one scene to show why the complaints surrounding her casting were always profoundly misguided". Some reviewers felt Abby's role in the second season was to primarily establish her for the third; The Hollywood Reporter's Han found "she registers more as a plot point than as a person". Paste's Elijah Gonzalez applauded Dever's acting but felt she was unable to "embody the intimidating physicality of her in-game counterpart". Dever was nominated for Best Guest Actress in a Drama Series at the 5th Astra TV Awards and Outstanding Guest Actress in a Drama Series at the 77th Primetime Creative Arts Emmy Awards.

=== Owen ===
Owen (Spencer Lord) is a WLF member and former Firefly soldier who was present at Joel's hospital massacre in the first season. Owen is a gentle person whose physical strength forces him to fight enemies he does not hate. In the second season, he and his girlfriend Mel help Abby in searching for Joel. He supports Abby in her search but seeks to discourage her upon realizing Jackson's strength. After Joel's death, Owen returns to Seattle with Abby, Mel, Nora, and Manny. Months later, Ellie finds him with Mel at the aquarium, holding them at gunpoint and demanding Abby's whereabouts. Owen grabs a concealed gun to shoot her but Ellie fatally shoots him. Lord's casting was announced on March 1, 2024. He was promoted to a series regular for the third season in March 2026.

=== Nora ===
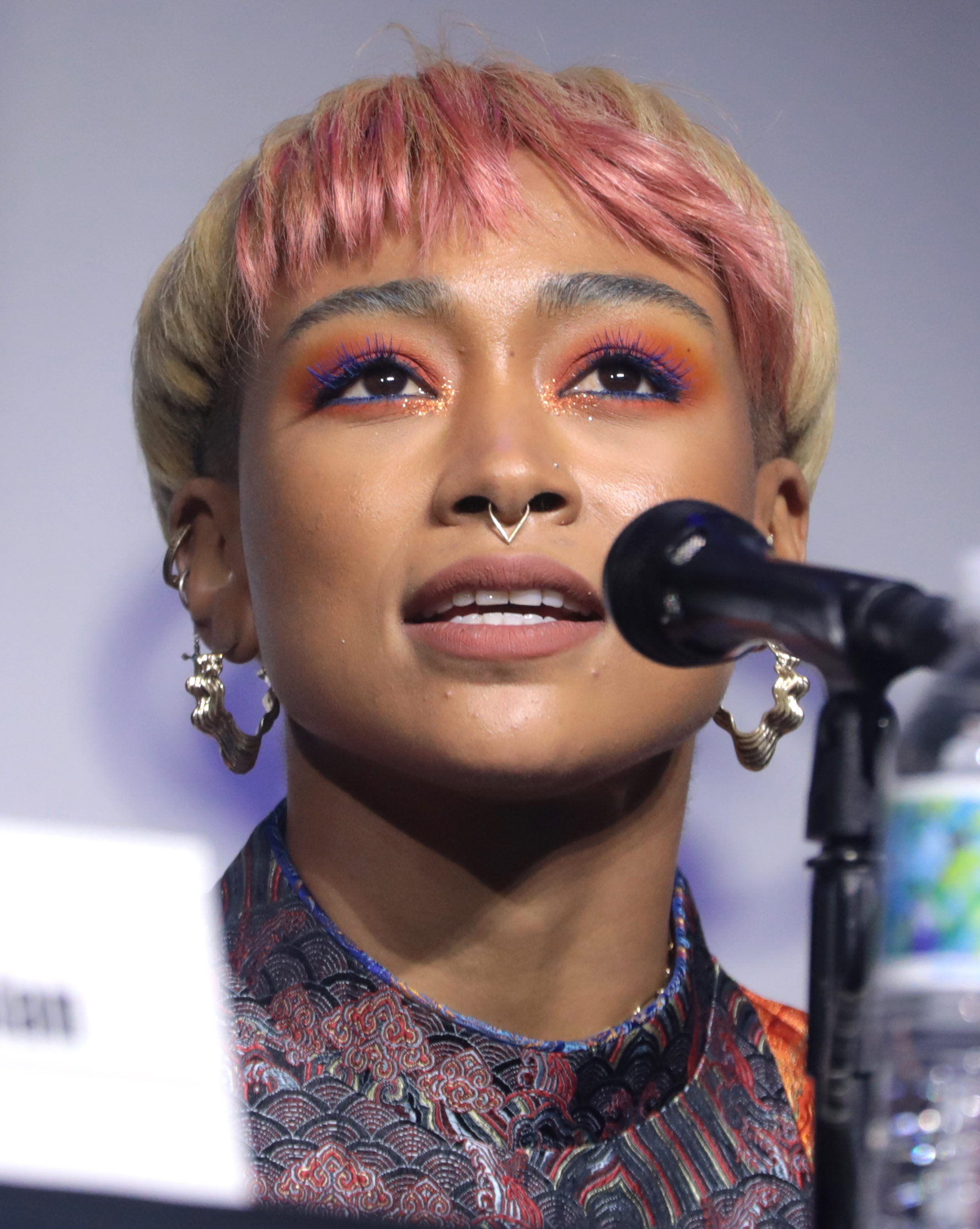
Tati Gabrielle portrays Nora.

Nora (Tati Gabrielle) is a military medic with the WLF who was a member of the Fireflies killed by Joel in the first season. She has difficulty accepting her past behavior. Nora travels from Seattle to Jackson with Abby, Owen, Mel, and Manny. She witnesses Abby beating Joel, pinning down Ellie as Abby delivers the final blow. Several months later, in Seattle, Ellie holds Nora at gunpoint to interrogate her for Abby's whereabouts. Nora apologizes for the brutality of Joel's death before taunting her about it. When Nora fights back and escapes, Ellie gives chase, evading the WLF soldiers firing at her. As Nora escapes through the sealed-off elevator shaft, it falls and leads her to the basement, where bodies exhale Cordyceps spores, infecting Nora but not Ellie. Nora realizes Ellie is the immune girl for whom Joel had killed the Fireflies, including Abby's father, who sought to develop a cure for the fungus. Ellie picks up a pipe and brutally tortures Nora for Abby's whereabouts. In her delusional state, Nora gives the word "wheel" and "whale", and Ellie leaves her to die.

Gabrielle's casting was announced on March 1, 2024. She also starred in the film Uncharted (2022), based on the Naughty Dog franchise, and portrays the protagonist of Naughty Dog's upcoming game Intergalactic: The Heretic Prophet. Gabrielle experienced a close death around the filming of "Feel Her Love" and recalled her "brain was a little in and out" at the time. She approached Nora's first scenes in the episode as if she was disassociating, torn between the justice and brutality of Joel's death. She thought Nora's behavior was prompted by loyalty to Abby and her father as she felt Joel's killing of the Fireflies "doomed the world". Gabrielle played Nora's apology to Ellie as genuine, believing she is also traumatized by the brutality of Joel's death, even though she felt he deserved justice for his actions. Gabrielle enjoyed the action scenes, which required several takes; she felt Nora would sprint to defend herself but was told to slow down.

Gabrielle "nerded out" with Mazin about Nora's infection from the spores, wanting to ensure the details were correct. Nora begins twitching as the infection overtakes her mind; Gabrielle found the combination of emotional and physical performance "probably the hardest thing [she has] ever had to do as an actor". When Nora realizes Ellie is immune, Mazin explained the scene to Gabrielle as if Nora was a slightly doubtful Christian who was seeing Jesus Christ or the face of God. Gabrielle thought Nora realized she had no hope after discovering Ellie already knew about Joel's actions, as it meant her quest was purely for revenge. She recalled the resolve in Ramsey's eyes helped her find Nora's emotions as she pleads to Ellie. Gabrielle insisted that Ramsey hit her harder during filming, considering it fair after she held Ramsey down for hours while filming "Through the Valley". They rehearsed the scene together but did not want to influence each other's work, preferring to keep their performances honest.

Eurogamer Victoria Phillips Kennedy praised the fear and defiance of Gabrielle's performance, and CBR's Doll appreciated her added characterization. Gabrielle was nominated for Outstanding Guest Performance in a Drama Series at the 9th Annual Black Reel Awards for Television. She was promoted to a series regular for the third season in March 2026.

=== Mel ===
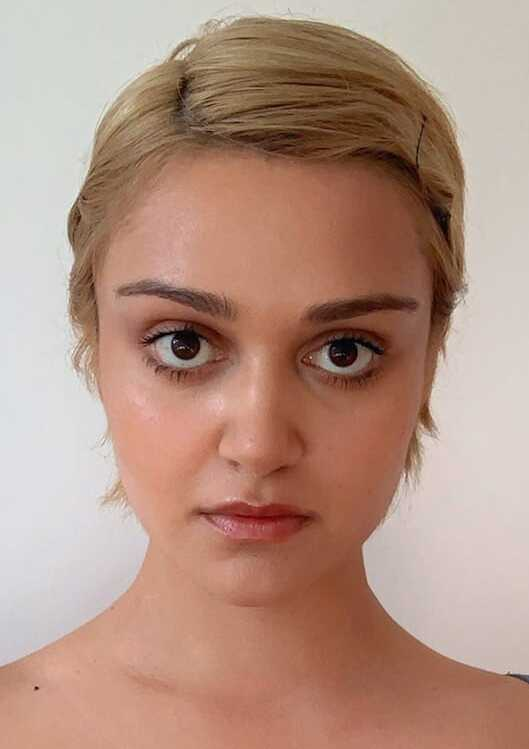
Ariela Barer portrays Mel.

Mel (Ariela Barer) is a WLF doctor who was a member of the Fireflies killed by Joel in the first season. In the second, she and her boyfriend Owen help Abby in searching for Joel. She is reluctant to hurt others, treating Dina gently and not wanting to harm anyone besides Joel. Mel is committed to her role while struggling with the realities of war. When Ellie fatally shoots Owen, the bullet strikes Mel's neck. Mel, revealing her pregnancy, begs Ellie to save her baby via C-section before she dies but Ellie is unable to do so.

Barer's casting was announced on March 1, 2024. Mazin wrote Mel's death to be darker in the episode than the game; Druckmann felt it was necessary to show the impact of collateral damage. He thought Ellie could justify all of her actions until now, but the death of a child was unjustifiable. Barer was nervous about the scene and continually cried. She was comforted by her friend, who related it to real events: "these horrible things happen for real. Women suffer this way in wartime. The least you can do is honor that." Mazin gave her additional lines during filming, such as Mel encouraging Ellie. He told her that tears were appropriate but Mel should not cry as she immediately becomes a parent quickly trying to save her child.

Barer felt Mel "sees herself in Ellie—someone who is forced into doing something by the circumstances of her life", referring to her participation in Joel's death. She portrayed the scene as if Mel gradually loses her senses, starting with her vision, but continues using medical language as if "she's on the operating table with her doctor friends who she trusts", and ultimately "dies thinking that she saved the baby". Mel's dying wish to save her child is reflective of the series's theme of "parents doing whatever they can to save their child". Barer's performance was praised for its powerful devastation; The A.V. Club's Siede found her pleading "devastating", and Eurogamer's Kennedy felt she "does a brilliant job bringing emotion to Mel's death". Barer was promoted to a series regular for the third season in March 2026.

=== Yara and Lev ===
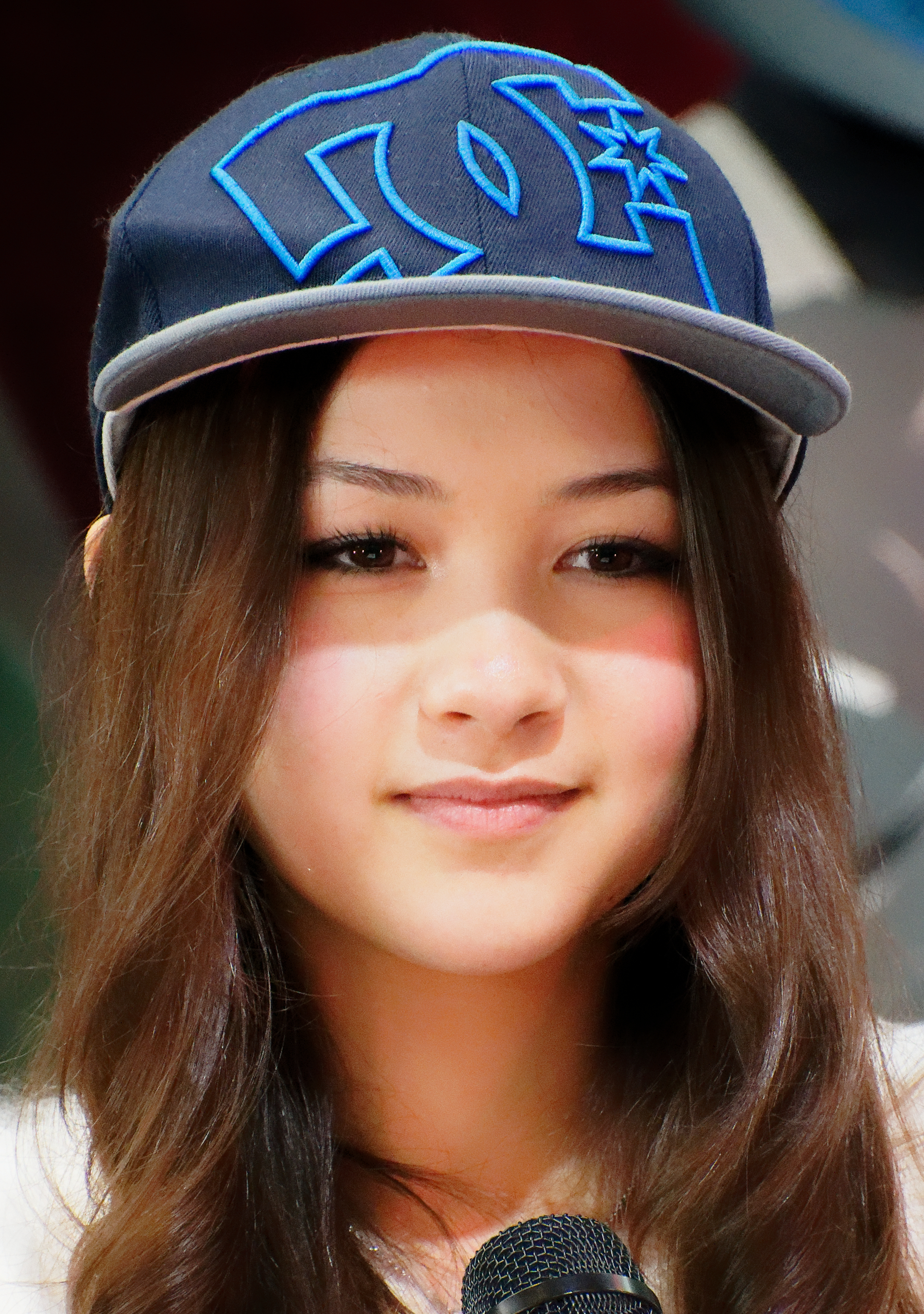
Kyriana Kratter is set to portray Lev.

Yara (Michelle Mao) and her 13-year-old brother Lev (Kyriana Kratter) are members of the Seraphites who encounter Abby in the third season. Lev is a transgender boy; an inclusive casting call was held for the character, featuring young performers from several different backgrounds. A Deadline article initially stated that the producers felt Kratter "best embodied" the role, though it was later edited to remove the statement. Kratter shaved her head for the role. Some journalists and fans criticized the decision to cast a cisgender actor as a transgender character, which Out's Dawn Ennis considered it a troubling example of transface; Kotaku's Shepard called it "a real fucking shame" and "such an obvious misfire", and TheGamer's Jade King felt HBO had "turn[ed] its back on transgender performers". Victoria Grace and Ian Alexander, who portrayed Yara and Lev in the game, had expressed interest in reprising their roles in 2023; some fans hoped the series would cast Alexander, a transgender non-binary actor, though others noted the 24-year-old may be too old to play the teenage character in live action.

== Secondary characters ==
=== Recurring ===
==== Maria ====
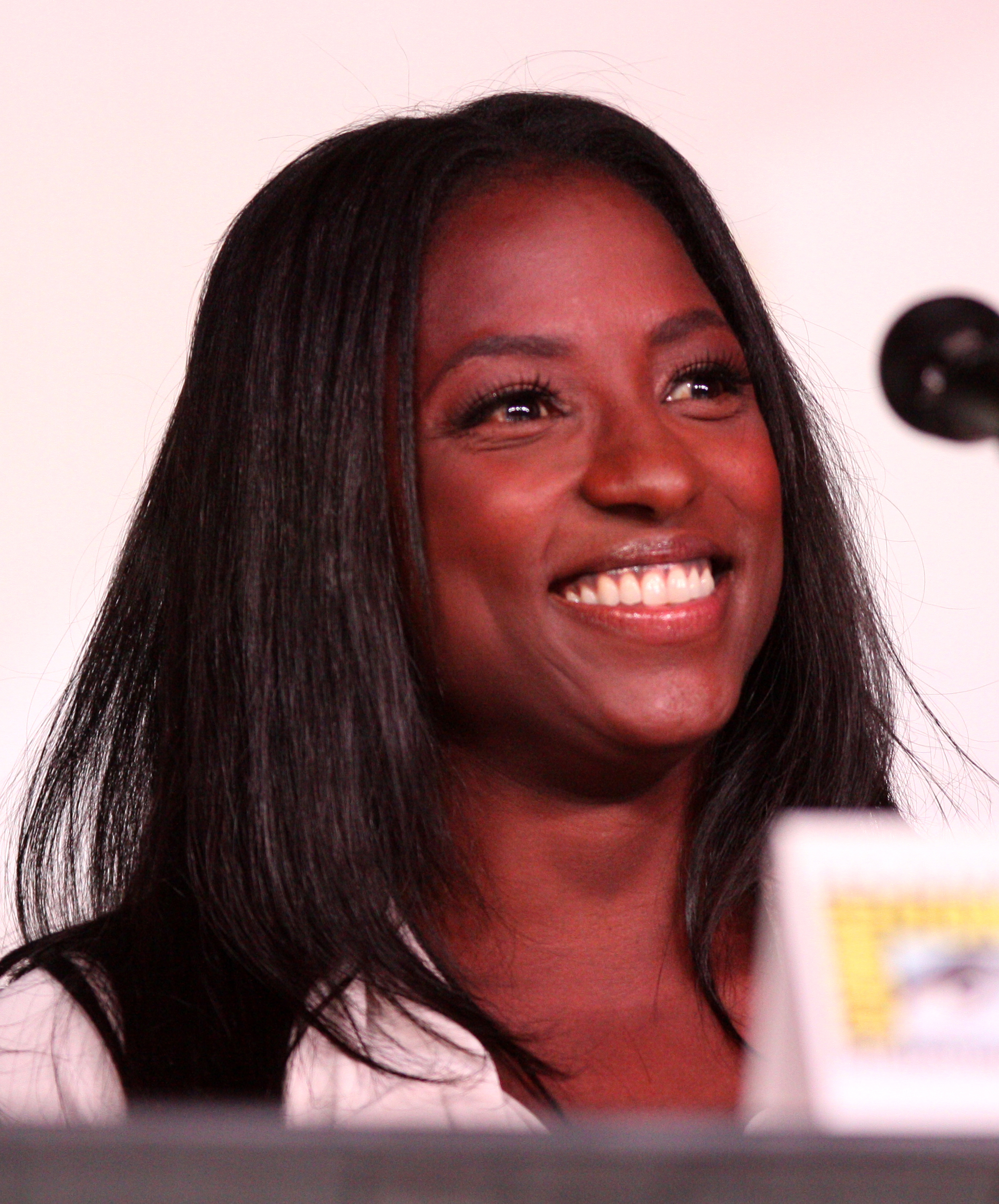
Rutina Wesley portrays Maria.

Maria (Rutina Wesley) is Tommy's wife and an elected member of the council governing the communist settlement of Jackson, Wyoming. A group led by Maria surround Joel and Ellie and take them to Jackson. Maria cuts Ellie's hair and warns her to be cautious of trusting others, citing Joel's dangerous past; Ellie rebuts, citing Tommy's. Tommy initially declines Joel's request to join him and Ellie to Colorado as Maria is pregnant. By the second season, Maria and Tommy have a son named Benjamin.

Director Jasmila Žbanić revealed Wesley's casting on December 9, 2021; her role as Maria was announced on January 9, 2023. Wesley researched the game to "capture the essence" of Maria but wanted to avoid replicating it; she found it "terrifying" to play a pre-established character but wanted to add her "energy on it". She appreciated Maria's calmness as a leader and observed she was a person who only smiles with her eyes; she thought Maria naturally entered a leadership role due to her history as an assistant district attorney. Wesley felt Maria gravitated towards Ellie in a motherly manner without realizing, due in part to her pregnancy.

Wesley thought Benjamin's birth brought Maria and Tommy closer in the second season, considering them "anchors for each other". She and Luna underwent firearms and stunt training for "Through the Valley". In "The Path", Wesley initially thought Maria would vote against Ellie's request to travel to Seattle but changed her mind after speaking with Mazin, realizing that the search for Joel's killers was for Jackson rather than Joel.

==== Manny ====
Manny (Danny Ramirez in season 2; Jorge Lendeborg Jr. in season 3) is a WLF soldier who was a member of the Fireflies in Salt Lake City. He is helping Abby to search for Joel. He is a loyal soldier who fears failing his friends. He maintains a jovial attitude despite the pain of his past. Ramirez's casting was announced on March 1, 2024. Several changes were made to the character to reflect the series's timeline, wherein the outbreak occurred in 2003; while in the game Manny has a Mexican accent, Ramirez uses an American accent to demonstrate the difference in cultural heritage and Mexican relations at the time. Ramirez was nominated for Best Guest Actor in a Drama Series at the 5th Astra TV Awards, and the Associated Press named him a Breakthrough Entertainer of 2025 for his work in The Last of Us and Captain America: Brave New World. Manny is set to have a more significant presence in the third season, which Ramirez was told by Mazin when auditioning for the role. Ramirez departed the role in December 2025 due to scheduling conflicts; he was recast by Lendeborg for the third season in February 2026.

==== Isaac ====
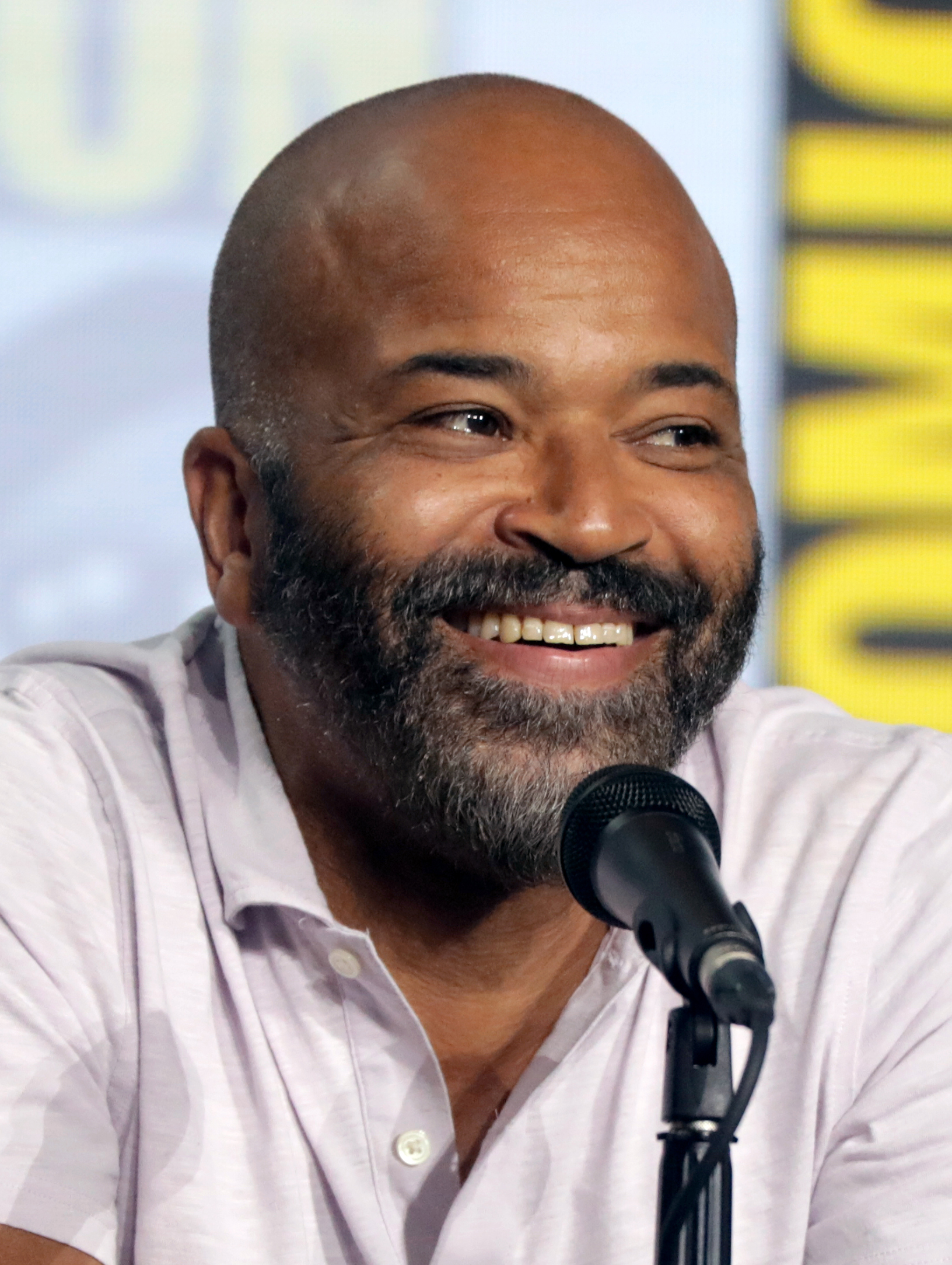
Jeffrey Wright reprised his role as Isaac from the video game.

Isaac Dixon (Jeffrey Wright) is the ruthless leader of the WLF, a militia group who faces an ongoing war in their pursuit for liberty. He was formerly a sergeant for FEDRA, defecting in 2018 to join the WLF. Wright's casting was announced on May 24, 2024; he reprises his role from The Last of Us Part II, the second actor to do so after Dandridge. Druckmann felt Wright's casting was logical, as he is the correct age and appearance for Isaac. The series explores more of Isaac's backstory than the game as the writers were not restricted to the perspective of the player characters. Mazin was interested in the idea that characters like Isaac had ordinary pre-apocalypse lives, despite their chaotic present-day behaviors, prompting the inclusion of Isaac's speech about his love of cooking for his dates. Wright did not believe Isaac betrayed FEDRA, but rather that the agency betrayed him by abandoning its ethics.

Critics praised Wright's performance in the second season for his captivating and menacing nature, immediately drawn in by his unsettling charisma. Total Film's Milici called his role "bone-chilling". Comic Book Resources's Doll felt he "takes the spotlight", particularly in his calm and commanding presence during the fourth episode's interrogation scene, and TheWrap's Alex Welch suspected Wright's talents were introduced to account for Pascal's departure. Rolling Stone's Sepinwall enjoyed Wright's performance but found the character "an extremely trope-y case of a villain", particularly in his monologue. IndieWire's Ben Travers recognized Isaac's use of cooking utensils as torture reflected a recurring theme in the series: turning "a gesture of love ... into a weapon of hate". Some critics felt Wright was underused and had hoped for more scenes. He won Best Guest Actor in a Drama Series at the 5th Astra TV Awards, and was nominated at the 9th Annual Black Reel Awards for Television and the 77th Primetime Creative Arts Emmy Awards.

The third season is set to show more of Isaac and his leadership style.

=== Season 1 ===
==== Sarah ====
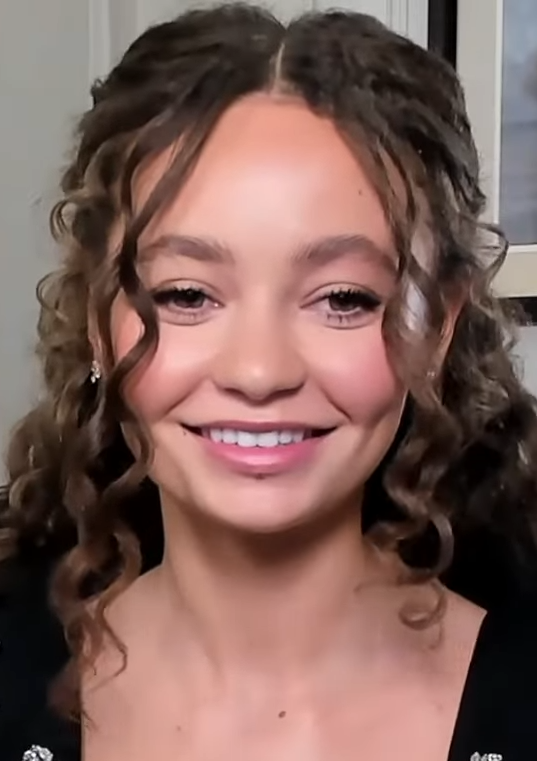
Nico Parker portrays Sarah.

Sarah (Nico Parker) is Joel's 14-year-old daughter. In 2003, Sarah is awakened in the middle of the night and discovers her neighbors attacked by a creature, a once-senile elderly woman. Joel kills the creature. As Joel, Tommy, and Sarah flee through crowds, debris from a crashed airplane overturns Tommy's truck. Joel runs while carrying an injured Sarah but gets cornered by a soldier, who shoots at them. Tommy kills the soldier, but Sarah is fatally wounded and dies in Joel's arms.

Parker's casting was announced on June 30, 2021. Parker watched videos of the game years before getting the role. She wanted to "stay away from the game version" and provide her own interpretation of the character; she felt intimidated at the prospect of portraying Sarah's death due to its impact in the game. Pascal felt an instant bond with Parker, with whom he filmed scenes first.

Rolling Stone's Sepinwall lauded Parker's performance for "holding the screen" and establishing Sarah as likable, and Den of Geek's Boo wrote her "performance is warm and compassionate", making her death more impactful. The Guardian's Andy Welch felt Parker "has a promising career ahead of her". Parker was nominated for Outstanding Guest Performance in a Drama Series at the 7th Annual Black Reel Awards for Television.

==== Marlene ====
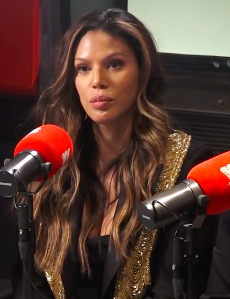
Merle Dandridge reprises her role of Marlene from the video games.

Marlene (Merle Dandridge) is the head of the Fireflies, a resistance movement hoping to gain freedom from the military. Marlene knew Ellie's mother, Anna, her whole life. After Anna gave birth to Ellie, she asked Marlene to kill her to prevent infection and take Ellie back to Boston; she hesitantly does so. Fourteen years later, after Ellie is bitten, Marlene orders the Fireflies to keep her caged. She reveals she placed Ellie into the Federal Disaster Response Agency (FEDRA) military school as a child for her protection but now plans to transport her west. After a botched deal leaves most Fireflies dead, Marlene begs Joel and Tess to take Ellie to the Massachusetts State House in exchange for supplies; they accept. After Joel and Ellie arrive in Salt Lake City, Marlene explains to Joel doctors are preparing surgery on Ellie that will kill her. She orders two soldiers to escort Joel out of the hospital; Joel escapes and kills most of the Firefly soldiers to take Ellie. Marlene intercepts them in the parking garage, stating there is still time for Joel to do the right thing, but he shoots and kills her.

Dandridge's casting was announced on May 27, 2021. Dandridge reprises her role from the video games, the first actor to do so; Mazin and Druckmann felt, unlike most other actors from the game, she physically resembled her character, only requiring a wig. Dandridge revisited the game in preparation. She was consistently surprised by the physical elements on set, having only portrayed Marlene within a motion capture stage and suit during the games. She found the character had "a heavier stillness" in the show, which she attributed to the weight of living in the post-apocalyptic world. Dandridge found the ninth episode's cold open provided important context for the relationship between Marlene and Anna, and was happy to work alongside Johnson again. She tried to forget her performance in the game and focus on the contextual differences in Marlene's scenes with Joel, particularly noting the differences in the script and location. Dandridge cried while recording automated dialogue replacement for the episode—a first for her—as she found Anna's death so emotional. She "had a really hard time" while filming Marlene's final scenes, partly due to the overwhelming emotions of the character's decision and consequences.

==== Tess ====
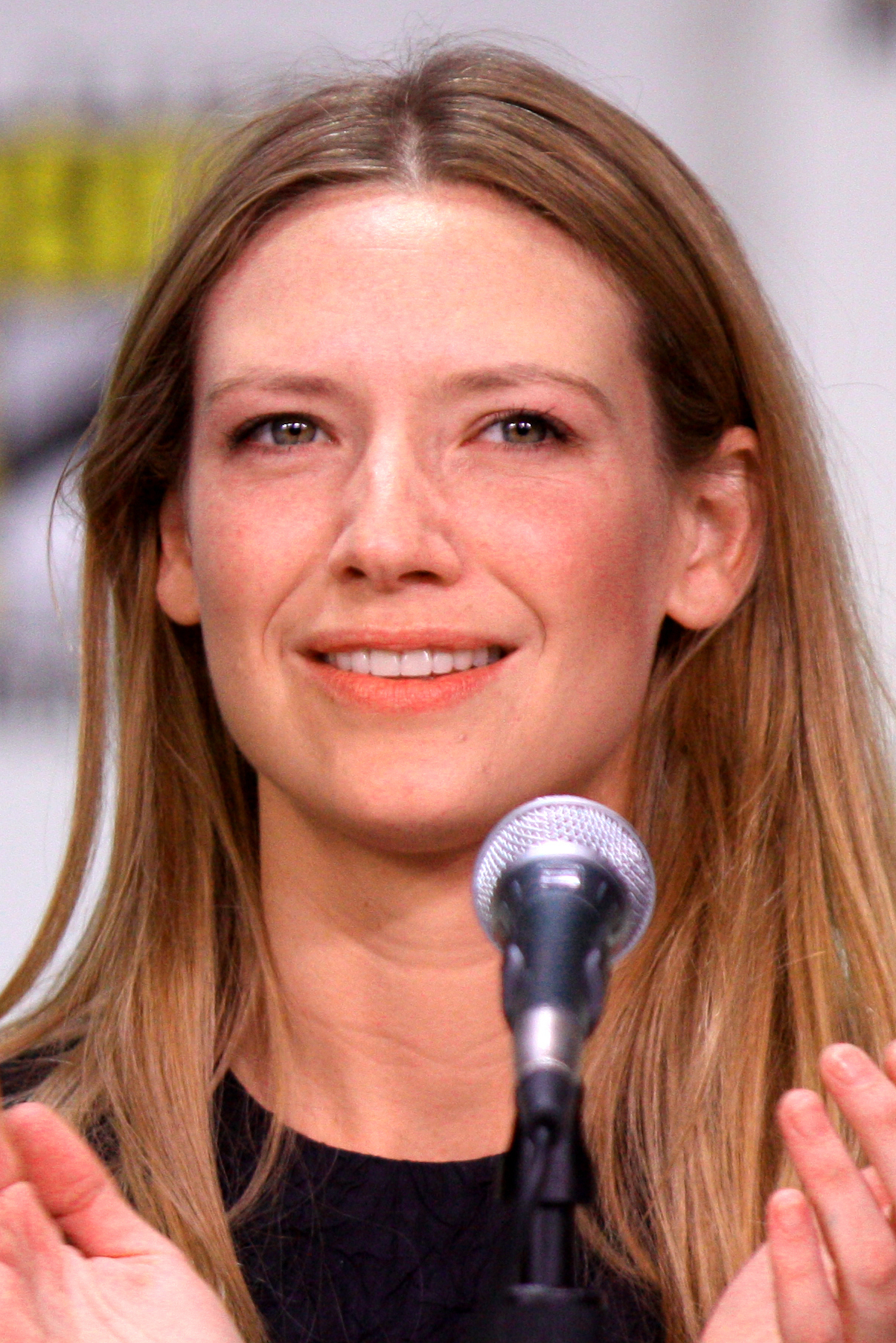
Anna Torv portrays Tess.

Tess (Anna Torv) is a hardened survivor and Joel's smuggler partner. In 2023, Tess lives in Boston with her partner Joel, with whom she smuggles and sells contraband. Marlene begs Joel and Tess to take Ellie to the Massachusetts State House in exchange for supplies; they accept. After discovering Ellie's potential immunity, a skeptical Tess convinces Joel to follow through as the Fireflies will still give them supplies. Arriving at the State House, they find the Fireflies dead. Tess tries to find clues on where to go next, but Joel tells her the job is finished and they will return home. Tess tells him that she cannot go back, revealing a bite mark on her neck. She covers the room with gasoline and grenades as Joel and Ellie leave. An infected man begins the process of converting Tess when she ignites the building, killing the creatures.

Torv's casting was announced on July 22, 2021. Torv and Pascal decided Tess and Joel had been lovers for some time but, like in the game, were subtle about their relationship. She felt her performance required consistent truthfulness due to its subtlety. Torv was aware of the games but had not played them; she watched the cutscenes after her casting. Casting director Victoria Thomas noted several actors were discussed for the role but "no one quite fit"; she felt Torv was able to portray the necessary toughness and heart.

Den of Geek's Boo felt Torv matched the nuance of Pascal's performance in the first episode. For the second, TVLine named Torv the Performer of the Week, citing her complexity and subtlety. Total Film's Russell felt Torv demonstrated the character's emotional depth, and Den of Geek's Boo found it sophisticated and heartbreaking. IGN's Cardy wrote she displayed "warmth beneath a scarred, steely surface", lauding her relationship with Pascal's Joel. IndieWire's Steve Greene applauded Torv's capability to demonstrate Tess's sadness and pain through facial expressions alone. Torv was nominated for Outstanding Guest Actress in a Drama Series at the 75th Primetime Creative Arts Emmy Awards.

==== Ratna ====
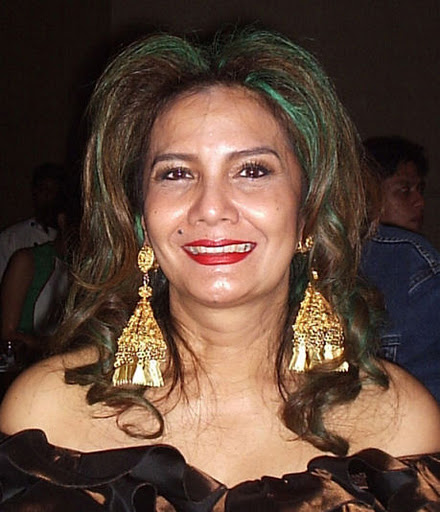
Christine Hakim portrays Ratna.

Ratna Pertiwi (Christine Hakim) is a mycology professor at the University of Indonesia. In 2003, authorities in Jakarta show Ratna a sample from a human, which she identifies as Ophiocordyceps. She is shown a corpse of a woman with a human bite mark on its leg and fungal growths in its mouth, and informed the woman was killed after biting her co-workers at a flour factory, while other co-workers are missing. Ratna remarks the location provides an excellent substrate for the fungus, adds there is no cure or vaccine for the infection, and recommends bombing Jakarta to contain the outbreak.

Hakim was contacted for the series via Instagram. She was initially hesitant to accept the role as she was caring for her mother and husband amid the COVID-19 pandemic but was convinced by her grandniece, a fan of the game. Her husband reassured her and told her the role "is not only for you, this is for Asia". Hakim recorded her role in Calgary in late October 2021. She brought her traditional batik scarves and Indonesian jewelry, which the costume department accepted for use in the series. IndieWire's Greene called Hakim "magnificent".

==== Bill and Frank ====
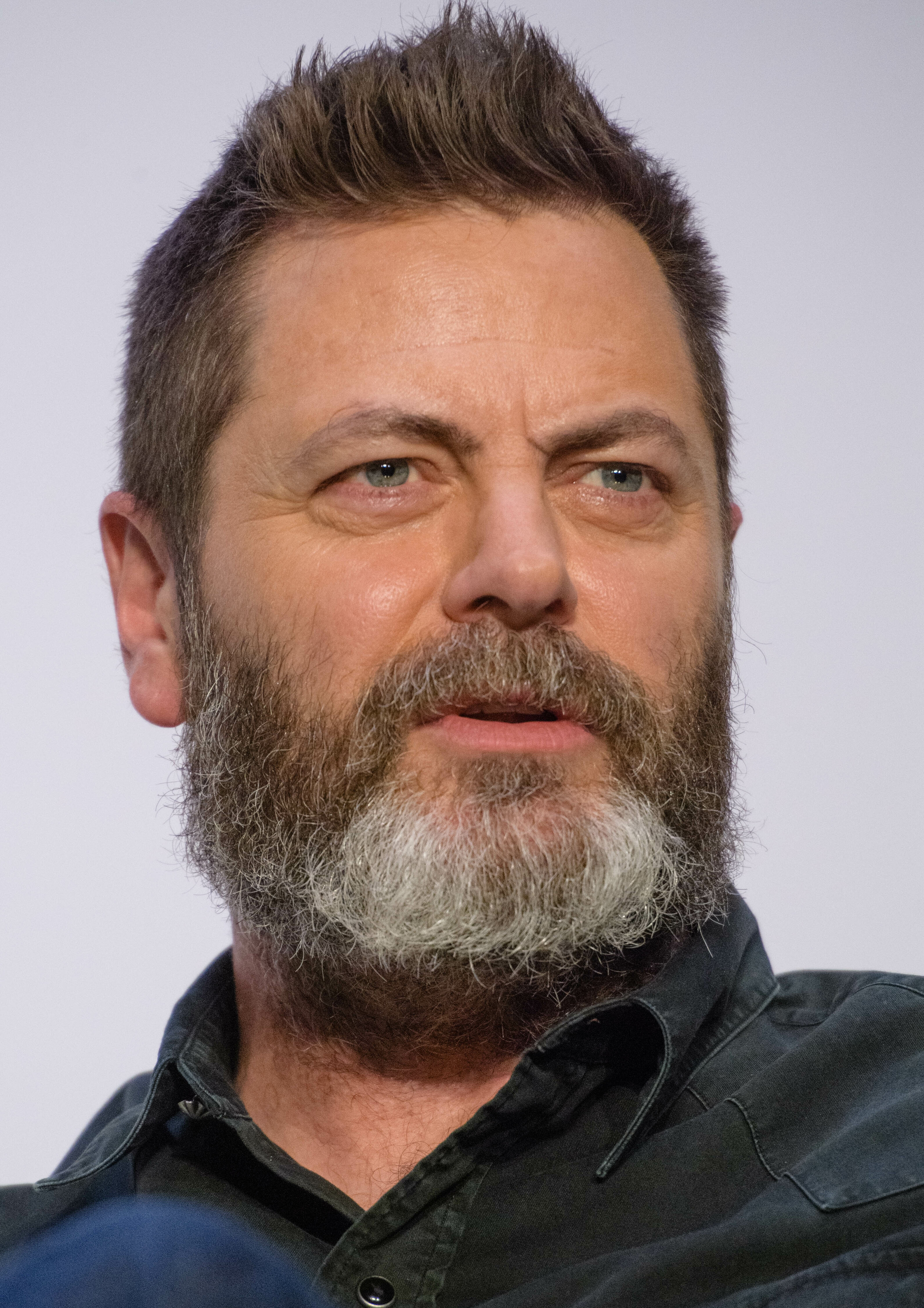
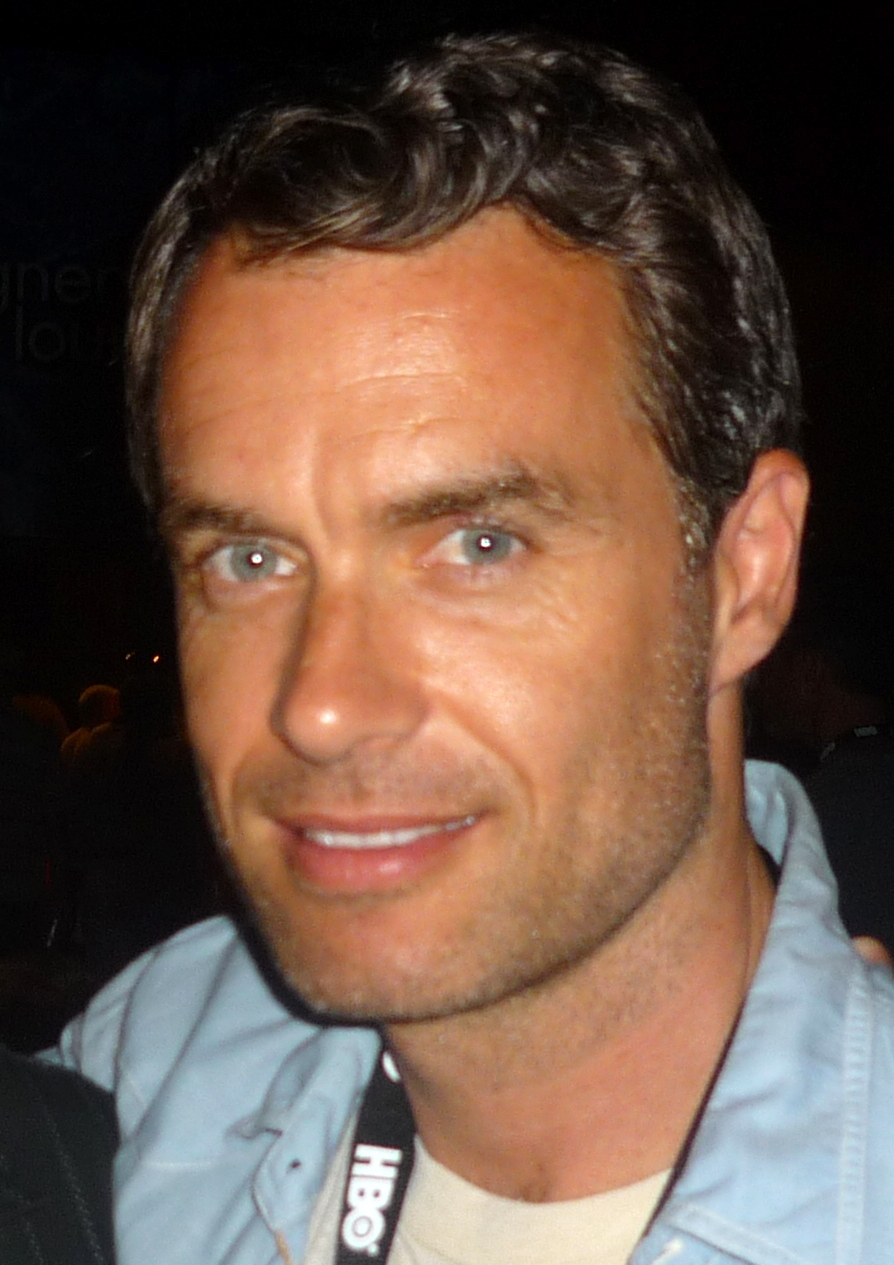
Nick Offerman (left) and Murray Bartlett (right) portray Bill and Frank, respectively.

Bill (Nick Offerman) and Frank (Murray Bartlett) are survivalists living in Lincoln, Massachusetts. After the evacuations, Bill ransacks abandoned businesses for supplies and materials to build a generator, electric fence, and traps. Four years later, he encounters Frank, who bargains for a hot meal, shower, and fresh clothes. He and Bill play "Long, Long Time" on the piano. He deduces Bill has never had a romantic partner. Frank kisses him, and they sleep together. Three years later, Frank invites Tess and Joel to establish a smuggling operation. Joel convinces the misanthropic Bill to accept Frank's plan by pointing out deficiencies in the town's defenses they can help fix. Later, raiders attempt to infiltrate the town, injuring Bill before being repelled by his defenses. Ten years later, Bill and Frank are elderly, with a degenerative disease leaving Frank with limited mobility; he asks Bill to help him die. Bill takes Frank to dress in new suits and they marry in their living room. After dinner, Bill places a lethal dose of sleeping tablets in Frank's wine and reveals he spiked his own drink as well, admitting he has no desire to live without Frank. They retire to their room. Bill leaves Joel his truck, weapons, and supplies.

Murray Bartlett and Con O'Neill's casting as Frank and Bill was announced on July 15, 2021. Bartlett was unfamiliar with the source material but was drawn to the show after he read the script. He researched the game after receiving the role and found it cinematic, citing the characters, narrative, and themes. According to Mazin, the producers cried during Bartlett's audition. Druckmann expected some fans to be upset by Frank's inclusion in the show due to the divergence from the game's narrative. On December 5, Bartlett claimed Nick Offerman would appear on the show in a role close to his; two days later, Offerman was announced to be playing Bill, replacing O'Neill who was forced to drop out due to scheduling conflicts with Our Flag Means Death. Mazin wanted gay men to play Frank and Bill, but after O'Neill's departure, he was drawn to casting Offerman at the suggestion of Strauss.

Mazin felt inspired to cast a comedic actor like Offerman because "funny people have soul", a mantra he learned from Vince Gilligan, citing performances like Bryan Cranston in Breaking Bad and Bob Odenkirk in Better Call Saul. A scheduling conflict originally prohibited Offerman from accepting the role but he decided to take it after his wife Megan Mullally read the script; he felt attached to the material and found a kinship with Bill due to his experience in crafting. Director Peter Hoar, executive producer Evan Wells, and co-executive producer Jacqueline Lesko met Offerman and Bartlett and had dinner before production to better understand the characters. Offerman was cleanshaven with short hair when he began working on the show; the production team decided to add long hair and a beard to demonstrate Bill's inability to express himself. Bill's first line in the episode—"Not today you New World Order jack-booted fucks"—was originally written as a description but Offerman insisted on saying it aloud. Offerman selected some of the books and videos to place in Bill's entertainment area.

A singing coach helped Offerman and Bartlett prepare for the piano performances; Bartlett was specifically coached to sing worse. Offerman rehearsed the song with Mullally, a singer. Cinematographer Eben Bolter recalled seeing Offerman's hands shaking between takes of the performance. Mazin and Offerman—both heterosexual—sought advice and approval from gay men involved in the production, including Bartlett, Hoar, editor Timothy A. Good, and unit production manager Cecil O'Connor. Mazin ultimately considered their age more important than their sexuality as he wanted to explore a long, committed relationship; having been married for 27 years, he understood "there's a different kind of love" in long-term partnerships. Mazin felt Offerman's inexperience in playing gay men added to the role, as Bill is similarly inexperienced in exploring his sexuality. Offerman considered the role important as he hoped the representation helped to "break down [the] walls" of gender stereotypes. In the sex scene, Offerman found Bill's discomfort "easy to channel" due to the crew members watching on set.

Offerman and Bartlett's performances were highly praised; Complex's William Goodman described them as a "career-best" and Inverse's Dais Johnston found them Emmy-worthy. TV Guide's Kat Moon similarly considered them deserving of Emmy nominations but felt Offerman's performance "demands special attention". Regarding the recasting of Bill, The Guardian's Welch wrote "it's now hard to imagine anyone other than Offerman in that role". Reviewers lauded Offerman's ability to portray Bill's gentler side, and Bartlett's eager and charismatic attitude as Frank; TVLine named them the Performers of the Week. Den of Geek's Boo wrote their "performance as a pair is pitch-perfect", and Vulture's Keith Phipps praised their ability to convey emotions without dialogue. Conversely, Vulture's Jackson McHenry found Offerman and Bartlett were "stuck in wooden roles acting out maudlin dynamics". Bartlett and Offerman were nominated for several awards, and Offerman won Outstanding Guest Actor in a Drama Series at the Primetime Emmy Awards.

==== Henry and Sam ====
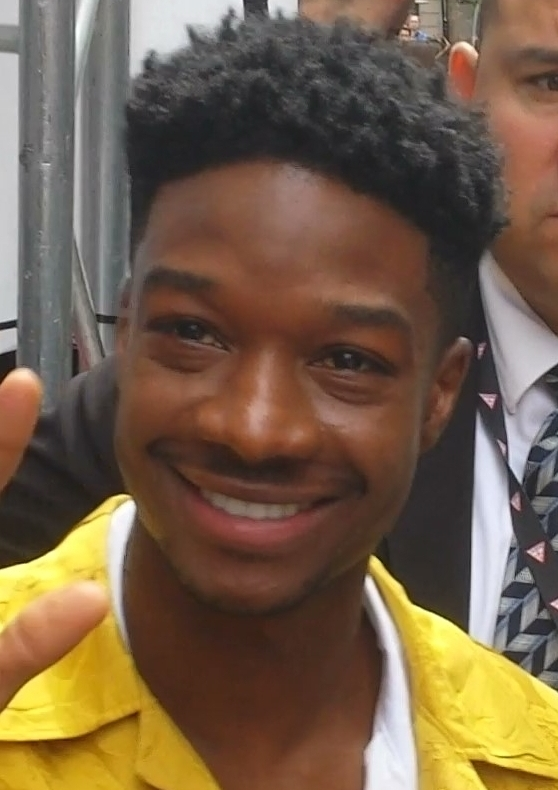
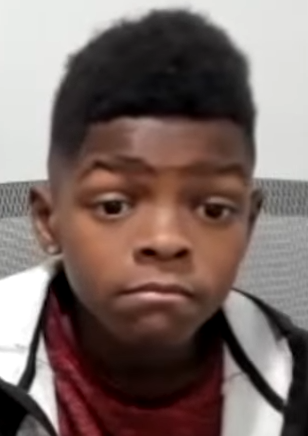
Lamar Johnson (left) and Keivonn Montreal Woodard (right) portray brothers Henry and Sam.

Henry Burrell (Lamar Johnson) and his eight-year-old brother Sam (Keivonn Montreal Woodard) are hiding from a revolutionary movement in Kansas City, Missouri. Henry betrayed resistance leader Michael to obtain medication for Sam's leukemia. After the movement, led by Michael's sister Kathleen, overthrows the government and takes control of Kansas City, Kathleen sets out to find Henry. Henry and Sam take refuge with a smuggler, Edelstein. Ten days later, Edelstein fails to return from a scouting trip and the brothers track down Joel and Ellie, whom they convince to help them escape. Henry proposes using the abandoned tunnels under the city to avoid Kathleen's followers. Joel hesitantly agrees while Ellie continues to bond with Sam.

After they leave the tunnels, a sniper pins down the group. Joel kills him, but not before he alerts Kathleen; she shortly arrives with an armed militia. As Kathleen prepares to kill Henry, a damaged truck crashes through the ground and releases a massive crowd of infected which quickly overwhelms her forces. Joel provides covering fire while Ellie rescues Sam and Henry. Kathleen corners them, only to be mauled to death by a clicker. The group flee. Later that night, Henry accepts Joel's invitation to join him and Ellie to Wyoming. Sam shows Ellie an infected bit him during the attack. She promises to stay up with him through the night but inadvertently falls asleep. The next morning, Sam, now infected, attacks Ellie; Henry grabs Joel's gun and kills his brother before killing himself. The next day, Joel and Ellie bury them.

Johnson and Woodard's casting as Henry and Sam was announced in August 2022. Johnson recalled his casting process occurred quickly: he sent his audition tape on Monday, received the role by Wednesday, and departed for the set by Saturday; by the following Wednesday, he started filming his scenes. He had played the game and wanted to avoid imitation the original performance, noting it had impacted him when playing. He was nervous about the role due to the character's importance in the games, but found his nervousness prompted him to challenge himself. Mazin provided information to Johnson regarding Henry's backstory to help him understand the character. Johnson felt Henry was hurt by his own actions against Michael, but Sam was ultimately more important to him. Mazin and Druckmann had several long discussions regarding Henry's fate and considered many alternatives, but ultimately considered his suicide, like in the game, reflected that he had nothing left after Sam's death. Johnson found the scene emotionally draining due to his relationship with Woodard; he "tried to be as present as authentic as possible" as he considered it the most important and iconic scene of the characters, and felt Pascal did the same opposite him. He was allowed to experiment with the scene, including performing lines similar to the game; he wanted to portray Henry's shock and confusion at the sudden events. Johnson considered Henry's final decision was to join his brother, as he felt the brothers had likely been religious their entire lives. He recalled crying behind the camera with director Jeremy Webb during Ellie's final scene with Sam.

Ramsey felt Sam brought out Ellie's childlike energy, which they largely attributed to Woodard. Mazin wrote Sam as deaf—a change from the game—to avoid his relationship with Henry feeling repetitious of Ellie's with Joel, which he felt would have been emphasized due to the different perspectives of the series. He had been watching the television series This Close (2018–2019)—which follows two deaf characters—and felt it may have influenced his decision. He found it automatically introduced intimacy to the scenes due to their quietness, which contrasted with Ellie's talkative nature. Druckmann was instantly drawn to the idea and wished he had included it in the game. Mazin hired This Close co-creator Shoshannah Stern to review the scripts. The production team faced difficulties in casting Sam; they were met with minimal candidates. In February 2021, Mazin distributed a casting call for a boy aged 8–14 who is deaf, black, and proficient in American Sign Language (ASL) or Black American Sign Language; Deaf West Theatre confirmed this was for the character of Sam. He had expected to receive around 80 auditions, but ultimately got about five, including Woodard; it was his first acting role.

Mazin felt Sam's leukemia was a more significant part of his story than his deafness. CJ Jones, whom Mazin met through Stern, acted as Woodard's liaison to the crew and helped teach ASL to cast and crew; Johnson began learning the language via Zoom shortly after arriving in Calgary, and spent his time away from set learning the language. He did not want viewers to think his knowledge of the language was fake, and considered his performance important for deaf representation. He felt spending time around Woodard for production gave him a better grasp on the language; Woodard would sometimes correct his mistakes in scenes. Sam's age was reduced from the game to allow him to look up to Ellie; Mazin felt this justified his revelation of his bite to Ellie, which does not occur in the game. In portraying Sam's bravery, Woodard recalled his own experiences of being told to stay brave after his father died. Johnson and Woodard worked on the series for two-and-a-half months.

Johnson and Woodard's performances received praise; Push Square's Bayne wrote they brought "every bit of fear, love and charisma that you expected", and IndieWire's Greene found them "exceptional in small moments", such as Woodard's desperation at their situation. TVLine named Johnson an honorable mention for Performer of the Week; IGN's Cardy lauded Johnson's emotional performance in his final scene, and Total Film's Russell felt the naivety of Woodard's role intensified the narrative. Johnson and Woodard were nominated for several awards, including Outstanding Guest Actor at the Primetime Emmy Awards, for which Woodard is the youngest ever nominee.

==== Kathleen ====
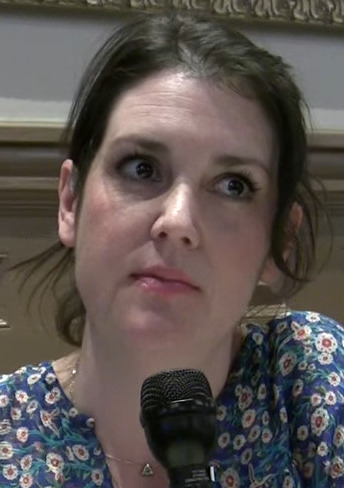
Melanie Lynskey portrays Kathleen.

Kathleen Coghlan (Melanie Lynskey) is the leader of a revolutionary movement in Kansas City. She took control of the resistance after the death of her brother, Michael; she blames Henry for his death. After Joel and Ellie kill some of her men, Kathleen openly postulates that Henry was responsible for contacting the killers and orders her followers to search the city. Her second-in-command, Perry, shows her a vacated room where Henry had been living. The floor of the basement-level storage room is buckling, and underground something is moving. Perry insists they deal with the problem, but Kathleen orders him to hide the evidence until they find Henry. Later, Kathleen explains to Perry that Michael had told her to forgive Henry before his execution, but she vows vengeance anyway, and Perry agrees. After a sniper spots Henry and Sam with Joel and Ellie, Kathleen shortly arrives with an armed militia. As she prepares to kill Henry, a damaged truck crashes through the ground and releases a massive crowd of infected that wipes out her forces. In the chaos, Kathleen corners Henry, only to be ambushed and killed by a child clicker.

Lynskey's casting as Kathleen was announced alongside a teaser trailer for the series in September 2022. Kathleen is an original character created by Mazin as the leader of a group of hunters who appeared in the game. Druckmann found following antagonistic characters made the story more interesting, allowing an understanding and justification of their actions, as opposed to being seen as "obstacles" like in the game. Mazin compared Kathleen to Madame Defarge from Charles Dickens's A Tale of Two Cities (1859): a revolutionary who becomes terroristic due to cruel circumstances, which allows the audience to empathize.

Mazin, who was friends with Lynskey, reached out to her about the role and described the character as "a war criminal". She was initially hesitant until Mazin pitched more about the character, describing her as someone who was forced into a role after the death of her brother, who "was basically Jesus". She could relate to the character's motivations due to her relationship with her four siblings. Mazin and Druckmann felt her casting was unusual as she has a "sweetness" that conflicts with Kathleen's position in the episode, an intentional decision to intrigue the audience; Lynskey wanted to play the character as "soft spoken and delicate" to juxtapose her violence. She felt Kathleen was likely less intense prior to her brother's death but was forced to become hardened due to her circumstances. In response to a comment from Adrianne Curry stating Kathleen's "body says life of luxury...not post apocolyptic [sic] warlord", Lynskey wrote the character was meant to be intelligent rather than muscly. She later added she wanted to portray the character as "feminine, and soft-voiced, and all the things that we've been told are 'weak'", noting she was hoping to subvert expectations.

Mazin and Druckmann did not want characters like Kathleen to feel like non-player characters from a video game, opting to give them full stories to humanize them and justify their actions. They felt adding a connection between Kathleen and Henry—and, by extension, to Joel and Ellie—made the storylines more effective and justified the different perspectives. Mazin wanted Kathleen's death to represent the notion of violent actions meeting violent ends, and Druckmann felt her obsession with justice led her to become distracted from her own survival. Lynskey knew of Kathleen's fate when she accepted the role. She found the scene easy to film due to the coordination of the team, as they had been planning for weeks. Mazin found Kathleen being killed by a child important, as minutes earlier she had told Henry that children die all the time. Lynskey recorded her death sounds as automated dialogue replacement; Mazin and Druckmann directed her to "sound like someone was ripping your throat out".

Lynskey's performance received praise. Den of Geek's Boo wrote she "does a fantastic job of coming across as formidable and vicious while letting her character's humanity seep through just enough". The Escapist's Darren Mooney lauded her juxtaposition of a "domestic archetype with something more primal and violent beneath it". Total Film's Russell felt Lynskey's performance lacked the necessary intimidation, and The A.V. Club's Cote found her delivery "edges dangerously close to end-times camp". Lynskey received nominations at the Astra Creative Arts TV Awards and Primetime Emmy Awards.

==== Perry ====
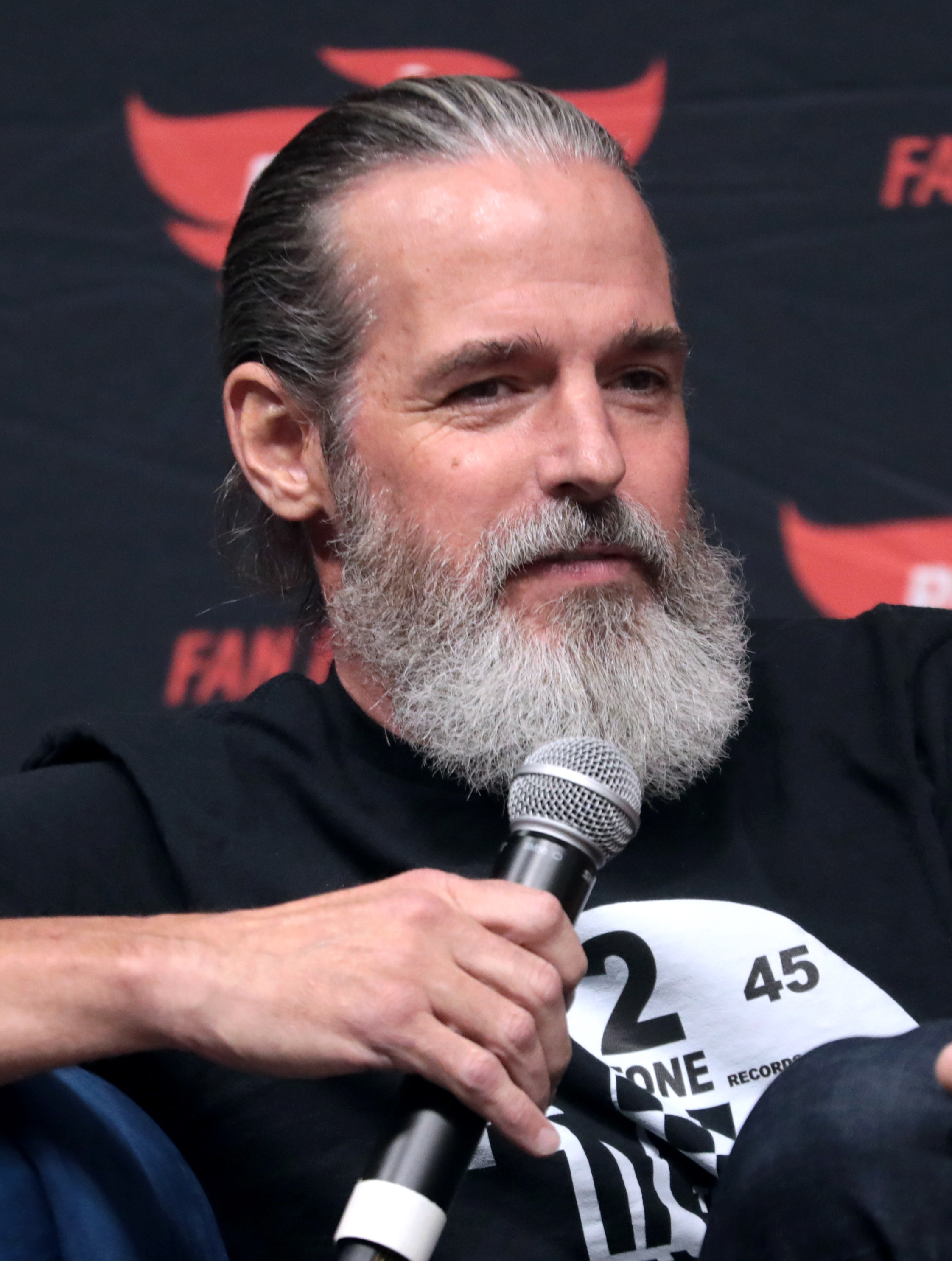
Jeffrey Pierce, who portrays Tommy in the games, plays Perry in the series.

Perry (Jeffrey Pierce) is Kathleen's second-in-command. He shows her a vacated room where Henry had been living. The floor of the basement-level storage room is buckling, and underground something is moving. Perry insists they deal with the problem, but Kathleen orders him to hide the evidence until they find Henry. Later, Perry agrees not to forgive Henry. When a massive crowd of infected is released, Perry tells Kathleen to flee, before he is torn apart by a bloater.

Pierce's casting as Perry was announced on July 15, 2021. Pierce previously portrayed Tommy in the video games. He reached out to Druckmann to offer his support for the series and "was lucky that something came up that fit"; he auditioned for a different role three times but Mazin and Druckmann felt his performance was unbelievable "as a victim", ultimately offering him the role of Perry about a week later. Perry is an original character in the show who, according to Pierce, "has huge implications for things" that occurred in the game. The script described him as a former military member.

==== Marlon and Florence ====
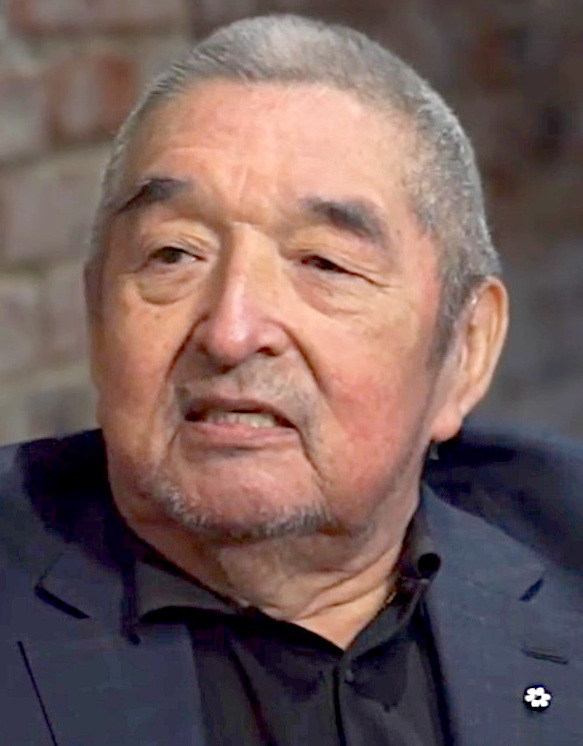
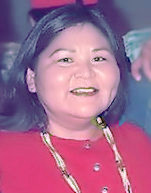
Graham Greene (left) and Elaine Miles (right) portray married couple Marlon and Florence.

Marlon (Graham Greene) and Florence (Elaine Miles) are a Native American married couple who live in the wilderness of Wyoming; despite Florence's wishes to the contrary, the couple isolated themselves decades before the outbreak. They tell Joel and Ellie their whereabouts and warn them to avoid the dangers further west. Žbanić revealed Greene and Miles's casting on December 9, 2021; they were confirmed to be playing original characters Marlon and Florence in August 2022. Mazin felt, like other pairings in the show, they echoed parts of Joel and Ellie's relationship. The Washington Post's Park praised Greene and Miles; Polygon's Pete Volk considered them the sixth episode's standout and wanted more content with them.

==== Riley ====
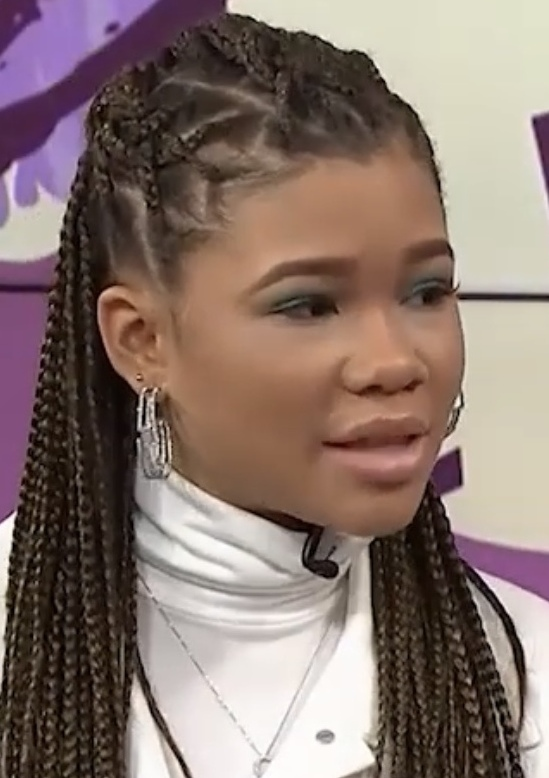
Storm Reid portrays Riley.

Riley Abel (Storm Reid) is an orphaned girl who is Ellie's best friend at military school in post-apocalyptic Boston. After being missing for weeks, Riley sneaks into Ellie's room. Ellie is angry with her for joining the Fireflies. Riley takes Ellie to an abandoned mall, where she shows her an escalator, carousel, photo booth, and arcade. When Ellie finds Riley's bed and homemade bombs, she confronts Riley about the Fireflies's violent philosophies. Riley reveals the Fireflies are moving her to the Atlanta Quarantine Zone, and she brought Ellie to the mall to say goodbye. Ellie initially storms out of the mall, but returns to Riley. The two dance together and Ellie desperately pleads with Riley not to leave. Riley agrees, and they kiss. An infected, drawn to the noise, attacks the pair. Ellie eventually kills it, but is horrified to realize both she and Riley have been bitten. Riley suggests they let themselves turn together, arguing that no matter how little time together they have left, it is worth fighting for.

Reid's casting as Riley was announced on January 14, 2022. She was unfamiliar with the game prior to her casting; when approached to star in the show, she asked family and friends for their opinions on the game. She watched snippets of gameplay to understand the emotion, but otherwise avoided the game to ensure an original take on the role; she wanted to "hone in on" the manner in which Riley moves and "took up space". Reid worked on the series for about a month. Ramsey found Ellie and Riley's chemistry relatable and noted it made their performance easier. Ramsey and Reid had little time to bond prior to production. They became close over the course of production; Reid called Ramsey "Mom" in one take. Reid found the final scene emotional to perform as it was one of the last filmed. Riley originally appeared in a downloadable content pack for the first game, The Last of Us: Left Behind.

Reid's performance received praise; Bleeding Cool's Tom Chang called it "award-worthy". Several critics found her chemistry with Ramsey convincing and the episode's highlight. /Film's Motamayor wrote Reid "gives a memorable performance that ... sticks with you long after the credits roll", and Push Square's Bayne felt she effectively captured Riley's sense of "youthful pride". Reid won Outstanding Guest Actress at the Primetime Emmy Awards and Outstanding Guest Performance in a Drama Series at the 7th Annual Black Reel Awards for Television.

==== David ====
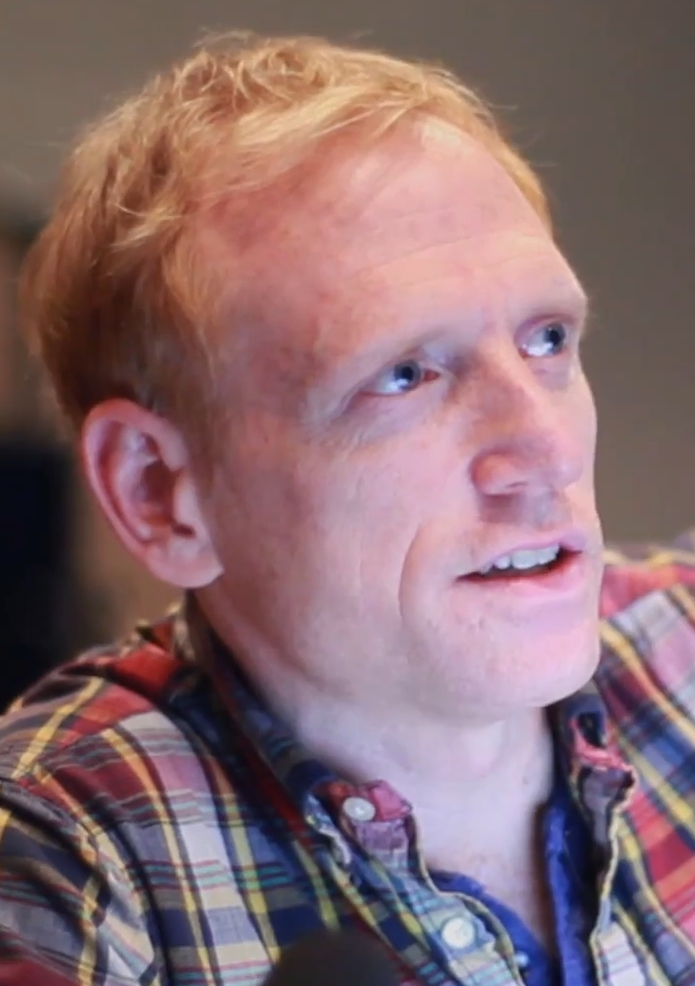
Scott Shepherd portrays David.

David (Scott Shepherd) is a preacher who is the leader of a group. He and James encounter Ellie while she is hunting for deer. David explains he was a teacher, and found God after the outbreak and is now the leader of a group of survivors. The following day, David tracks her down and places her in a cage at his camp. After Ellie notices an ear on the floor, David reveals he has been feeding his group the flesh of their deceased. He tells her he admires her strengths and violence and they could begin a relationship, but she breaks his finger. Ellie bites David as he and James grab her. Before they can kill her, she tells them she is infected, as proven by her bite mark. As David hunts her, she sets fire to the steakhouse. She stabs him with a kitchen knife, but he overpowers and attempts to rape her. Ellie grabs David's fallen meat cleaver and kills him in a frenzied attack.

Druckmann felt the series allowed a deeper look into the character's complexities than the game; he and Mazin wanted to humanize David in his initial interactions with Ellie, before revealing more of his true nature when he slaps a young girl. Druckmann found David's goal of producing offspring through violence representative of some organized religions, and Mazin noted his goal to "secure a future" reflective of the ideologies of white supremacists. Shepherd's casting was revealed in the first trailer in December 2022.

Shepherd's performance received praise. CNET's Sean Keane called it "charismatic", and IGN's Cardy considered him an effective adversary opposite Ramsey. IndieWire's Greene lauded Shepherd's ability to deliver otherwise stereotypical lines; The A.V. Club's David Cote wrote his performance "is masterful in its wry, understated charm".

==== James ====
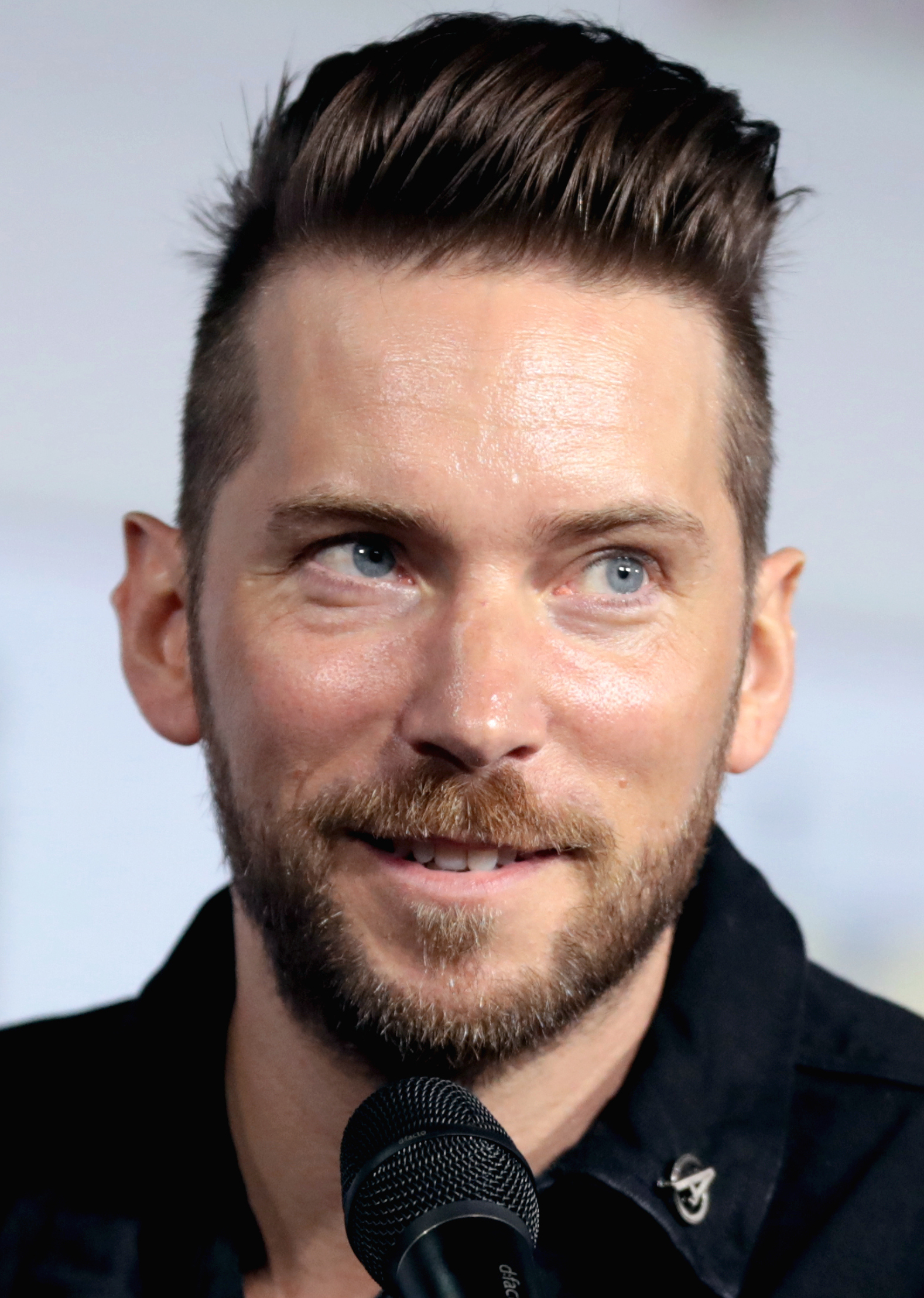
Troy Baker, who portrayed Joel in the video games, played James in the series.

James (Troy Baker) is a senior member of a group of settlers led by David. After encountering Ellie, James is sent back to camp to obtain penicillin. He joins David the following day as they track Ellie, and shoots and kills her horse and she attempts to flee. Ellie bites David as he and James grab her. Before they can kill her, she tells them she is infected, as proven by her bite mark. While they argue whether it is real, Ellie kills James with a meat cleaver.

Baker previously portrayed Joel in the video games. Mazin and Druckmann considered Baker's inclusion in the series important due to his proximity to the games; meanwhile, Baker never assumed he would be involved in the series, except perhaps as a small cameo like a clicker. Upon being approached by Mazin and Druckmann, Baker did not initially remember James from the games; he expected a small role but was surprised by the character's significance upon reading the script. Prior to the announcement of Shepherd's casting, rumors suggested Baker would play David, but he felt it "would've been too on the nose". His casting was announced in June 2022, and his character name was revealed in December.

Baker did not want to portray James as a villain but as someone with truth and empathy, reflected in his inability to shoot Ellie when prompted. He considered James a pragmatist who believes "David is the Devil" and, as a result, wants to remain on his good side; when Ellie's capabilities threaten to usurp James's position alongside David, he becomes defensive. Ali Abbasi directed Baker to pray in the opening scene, but Baker suggested otherwise, noting James "thinks it's all bullshit". He felt James was likely preparing to enter law enforcement when the outbreak occurred, supporting his experience with weaponry and demonstrations of morality.

==== Anna ====
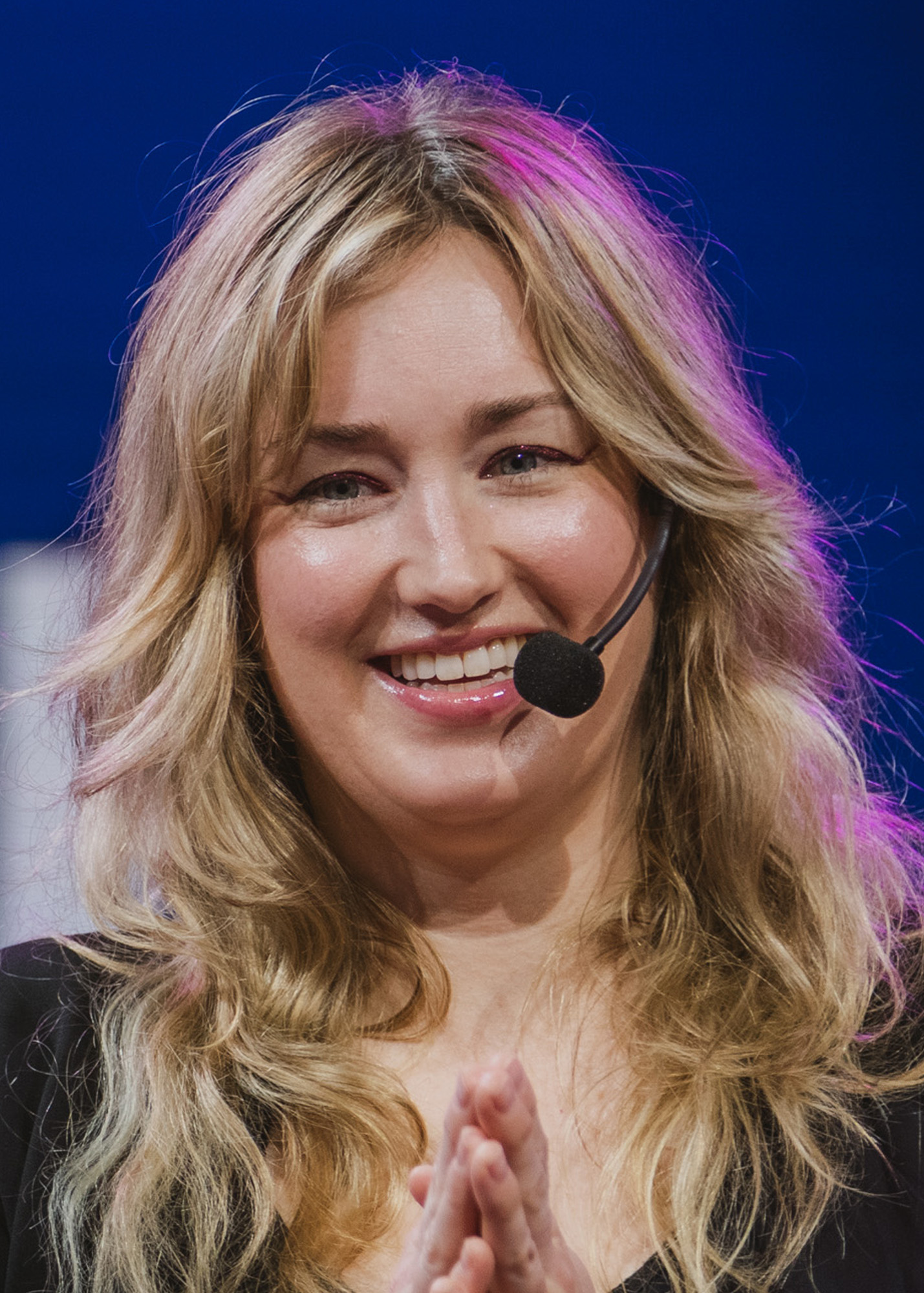
Ashley Johnson, who portrayed Ellie in the video games, played Ellie's mother Anna in the series.

Anna (Ashley Johnson) is Ellie's mother. A heavily pregnant Anna flees a pursuing infected by hiding in a house. The creature breaks in and bites Anna as she gives birth to Ellie. Some time later, they are found by Marlene and a group of Fireflies. Anna asks Marlene to kill her and take Ellie back to Boston; Marlene hesitantly kills Anna and leaves with Ellie.

Johnson previously portrayed Ellie in the video games. Druckmann was unable to explore Anna's story in the games but considered it personally important to include in the series; after the game's release, he wrote a short story about Anna, which was later intended to be adapted into an animated or live action short film or released as downloadable content but "it fell apart". Mazin found the story "gorgeous" and upsetting and demanded its inclusion in the series. Mazin and Druckmann simultaneously thought of casting Johnson; they considered her inclusion important due to her relationship with the games. Abbasi was hesitant about working with actors from the games—he had also worked with Baker in the previous episode—as he feared it was gimmicky, but found they added authenticity to the project.

Johnson cried after Druckmann offered her the role via text. She watched some of Ramsey's performance to match Ellie's mannerisms as Anna, and referred to her original combat style as Ellie for her fighting scene with an infected. She watched videos of natural births to prepare for the role, and recreated an in-game letter from Anna to Ellie and kept it in her pocket as a reminder of the character's origins. The production crew considered dressing Anna in pants but found a dress more logical; Johnson felt its bright colors reflected the character "holding onto the old world a little bit". Johnson's scenes were filmed over four days. She was nervous about working on the series without Druckmann—he spent several months away from set—as it was one of the first times she had worked on a Last of Us project without him, but he insisted she trust Mazin.

Den of Geek's Bernard Boo enjoyed Johnson's inclusion as Anna, and Total Film's Bradley Russell lauded her simultaneous portrayal of "pain and maternal instinct".

=== Season 2 ===
==== Seth ====
Seth (Robert John Burke) is a former police officer who runs a bar in Jackson. He has traditional values, drunkenly using a homophobic slur after Ellie and Dina's kiss, for which he later apologizes, noting he should not have had those thoughts. He is the sole vocal supporter of their decision to travel to Seattle for revenge, angrily arguing that a group should be sent to defend Jackson and its reputation. After the council reject the proposal, Seth provides supplies to Ellie and Dina and helps them leave Jackson, shaking Ellie's hand as she departs. Polygon's Susan Polo felt Seth's redemptive arc made his homophobia simply a vehicle through which to express narrative frameworks.

==== Kat ====
Kat (Noah Lamanna) is Ellie's ex-girlfriend, having dated between the events of the first two seasons. Kat tattoos a moth on Ellie's arm for her seventeenth birthday, and the two are intimate and smoke marijuana; Joel catches them and forces Kat to leave. Dina implies that Kat and Ellie are the only openly queer members in Jackson. Ellie and Dina defy her orders as the leader of their patrol. Lamanna's casting was announced on March 4, 2025. They were approached to audition for the series and were cast shortly after sending a tape. Lamanna wrote a lot of backstory for Kat and her actions over the five preceding years in Jackson to better understand the character, finding it interesting to fill in the gaps with the series's unanswered questions. Kat is only mentioned in Ellie's diary entries in The Last of Us Part II; Lamanna felt they had the space to expand the character in the series, instead of being tied to a specific portrayal.

Lamanna encountered some online discourse about the character's race, as she is depicted as Asian in the game's drawings; Lamanna is of Chinese descent. In the first episode, they channeled their own experience of pretending they have power when they do not, only to be "walked all over". They felt Kat and Ellie had remaining tension from their relationship but were forced to live together and collaborate within Jackson's small community, made worse by Ellie actively flirting with Dina on Kat's patrol. Lamanna trained with several horses at Danny Virtue's ranch, connecting with one named Jack; the producers instead preferred the color of a horse named Goldy, who did not follow Lamanna's instructions and caused them trouble. They enjoyed the experience, having ridden horses as a child. Lamanna appreciated the lightheartedness of Kat's scenes in the sixth episode in light of the narrative's trauma. They had not played the games but found it surreal to work alongside Pascal and Ramsey, having been a fan of the first season. ComicBook.com's Cade Onder called Kat's role in the series "a great example of how this adaptation can fill in some of the blanks left by the games".

==== Gail ====
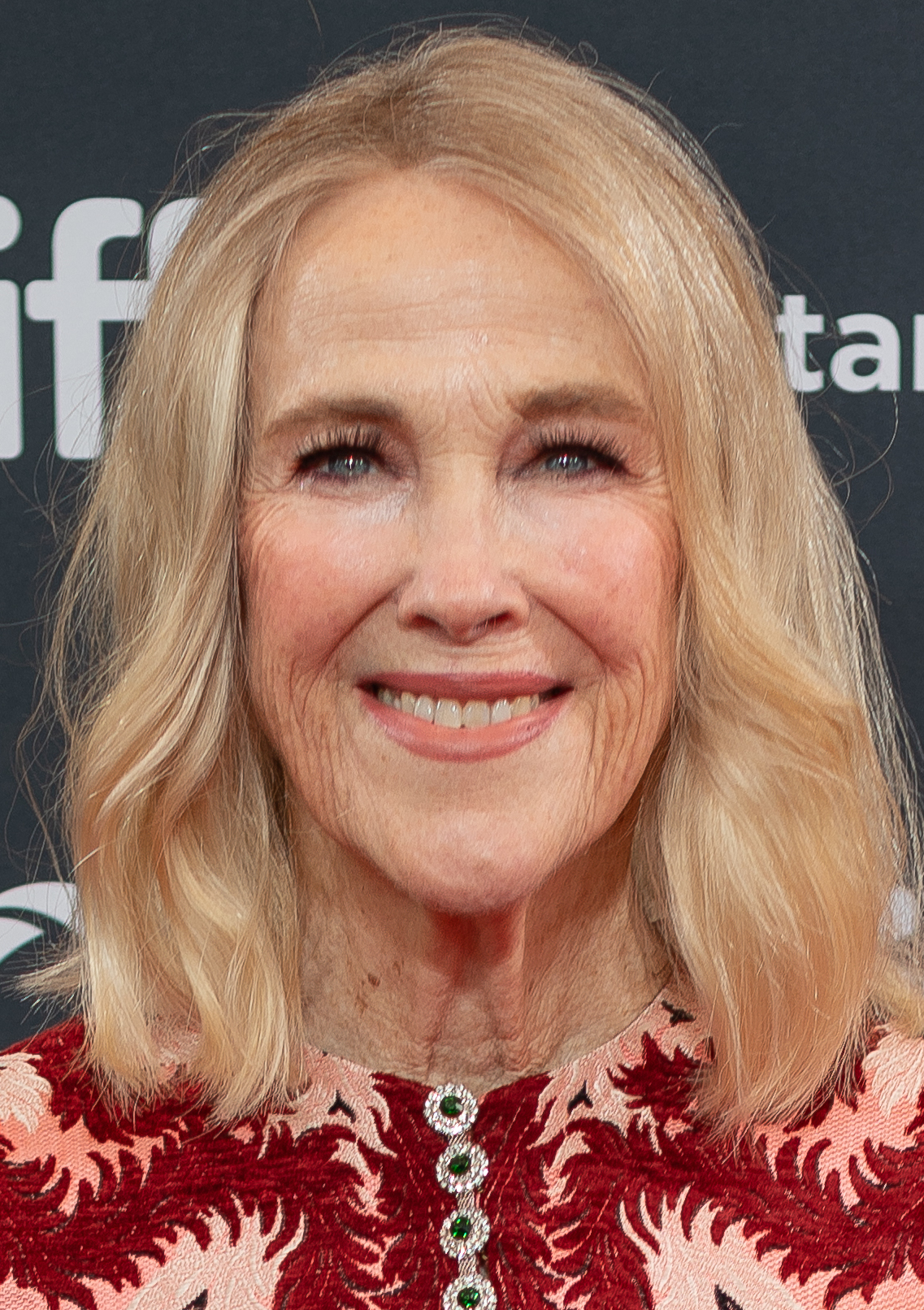
Catherine O'Hara portrays Gail.

Gail (Catherine O'Hara) is an original character to the series. She is Eugene's wife and Joel's therapist. Joel pays for his therapy sessions with marijuana. In her grief over losing her husband, Gail falls into alcoholism. She is cynical, not deceived by Joel's posturing. Rumors in January 2024 claimed O'Hara had been cast as Gail; her casting was announced on February 2, and her character's name was officially revealed in February 2025. Mazin felt O'Hara—a traditionally comedic actor—was suitable for the dramatic role due to her depth, inspired by Vince Gilligan's work on Breaking Bad and Better Call Saul, such as casting Bryan Cranston as Walter White. He offered her the role and she was allowed to read some scripts under secrecy. She watched the first season after being introduced through her sons, who played the games; one works on the series as a set dresser. She sought to bring some "good dark comedy" to the role.

A scene featuring Joel's therapist was cut from the first season before production, to Pascal's disappointment; Mazin intended to use the idea in the second season, considering therapy an opportunity to discover "what people are refusing to talk about". He felt Gail's scenes with Joel were like a "fist fight without fists". O'Hara avoided acting drunk as she wanted to relate to Gail. She requested to drink out of a cup based on a woman from her childhood who did the same with whiskey. The writers found the character compelling and wanted to "ground" her within the world; they thought Gail being Eugene's wife allowed them to weave her into the existing narrative, with both characters being tied to Joel. Pascal appreciated acting in a dramatic role alongside O'Hara due to her reputation for comedic roles.

Several critics applauded O'Hara's dramatic acting abilities, particularly in light of her comedic role in The Studio, airing simultaneously with the season; many felt she deserved Emmy nominations for both. NPR's Eric Deggans considered the performance "typically compelling" for O'Hara, and BBC's Caryn James wrote that she "delicately balances some mordant lines with Gail's grief over losing her husband". IGN's Cardy considered Gail "a proxy for the audience" but found she "frustratingly delivers exposition dumps" of character's feelings, rather than letting viewers assess. O'Hara was nominated for Best Guest Actress in a Drama Series at the 5th Astra TV Awards and Outstanding Guest Actress in a Drama Series at the 77th Primetime Creative Arts Emmy Awards. It was one of her last acting roles before her death in January 2026; the character had been set to return.

==== Janowicz ====
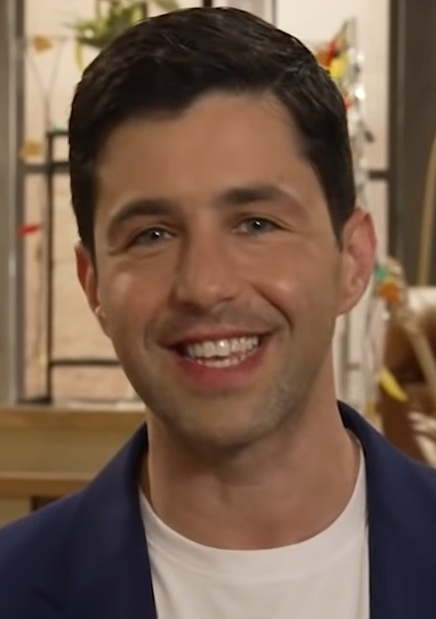
Josh Peck portrays Janowicz.

Janowicz (Josh Peck) is a FEDRA soldier in Seattle. In 2018, he jokes with other soldiers about the harassment and death of civilians, for which Isaac chastises him. When they encounter a WLF group, Isaac drops grenades into the vehicle, killing Janowicz and his squad. Peck had previously been mentioned in conversations about the series's casting. He watched the first season after securing the audition, which made him feel prepared after reading his scene. He read Janowicz's monologue for his audition, and considered it more interesting than typical audition lines. Peck secured the role about 2–3 weeks later, and filmed the following month. He felt the casting came "down to flavor and a look", noting the role could have been played by many other actors.

Director Kate Herron considered Peck "the best person" for the role and compared it to Drew Barrymore's role in the opening of Scream (1996). Peck felt he could relate to Janowicz in his enthusiasm to retell a favorite story to his friends, and thought that removing the additional context of the post-apocalyptic world allowed him to personalize the character. Peck filmed for two days: the first on a street in Vancouver, and the second on a soundstage. Peck's casting was not announced before the episode aired, surprising many journalists, who described his appearance as a cameo. The A.V. Club's Caroline Siede called Peck "well-deployed" in his role, though Esquire's Brady Langman found his appearance distracting.

==== Javier ====
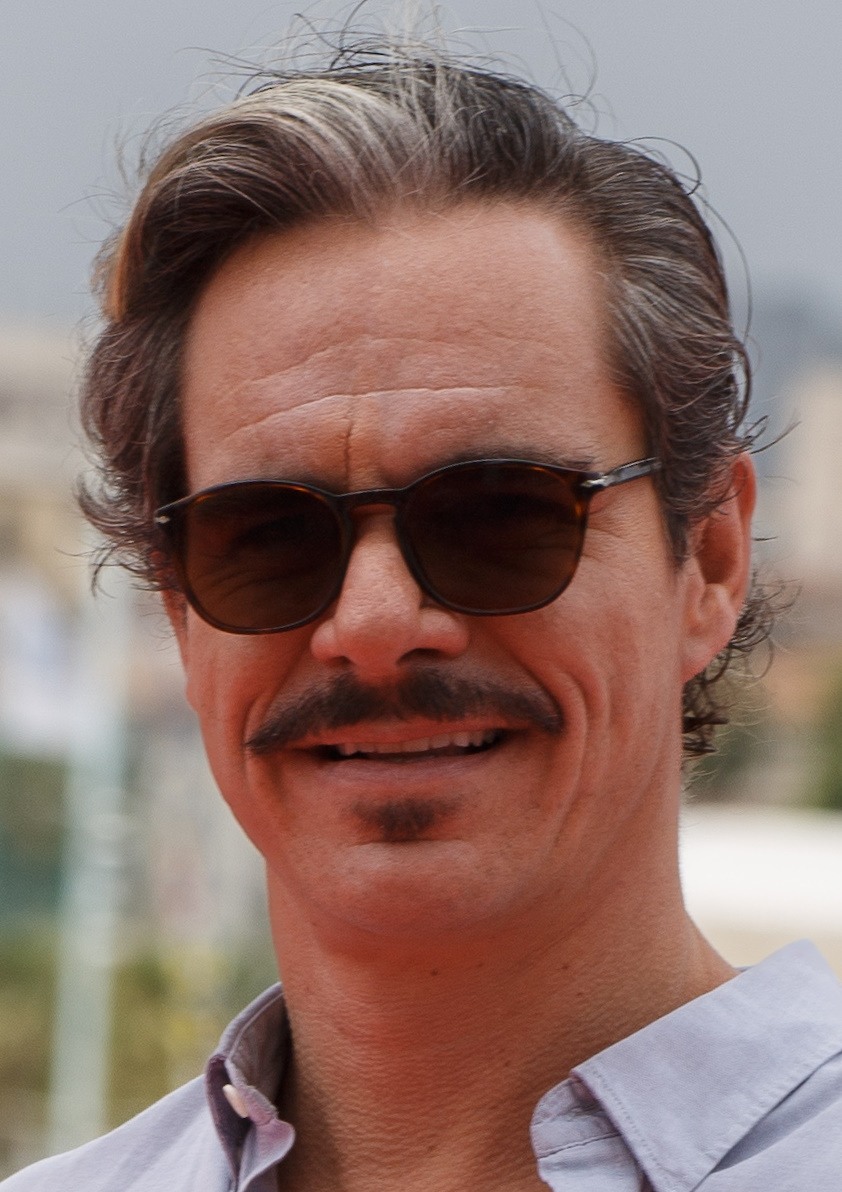
Tony Dalton portrays Javier Miller.

Javier Miller (Tony Dalton) is Joel and Tommy's father. An original character to the series, he is introduced in a 1983 flashback from Joel's childhood in Austin, Texas. Miller is a police officer with a history of using violence to discipline his sons. He reveals to Joel that he was abused even more violently by his own father as a child. Sharing his guilt about his own violence, Javier imparts to Joel that he hopes he does better with his own children. Druckmann pictured Dalton in the role while writing the scene, having enjoyed his role in Better Call Saul and met him at the Emmy Awards. He and Mazin pitched it to him over Zoom and Dalton was immediately enthusiastic. After working on The Last of Us, Dalton was cast in Intergalactic: The Heretic Prophet, co-directed by Druckmann.

The writers wanted Javier's scenes to demonstrate that one's behavior is often reflective of their parents, using the character to capture "both the negatives and the positives of the power of parenting" and his lifelong impact on Joel. As the scene was developed, Druckmann felt it was about "not only generational trauma, but generational repair and hope". Co-writer Halley Gross considered the scene a framing device that establishes Joel's behavior later in the episode: he reacts impulsively, like his father, before consciously slowing down and treating Ellie more respectfully. Mazin felt it demonstrated the progression of morals, feeling parents are kinder to children than in the preceding generation.

Javier wears the same watch later owned by Joel, an addition suggested by Gross, which the writers felt represented the passing of a parent's "programming" to their child. Early versions of the scenes included a more violent Javier, but the writers found it more interesting to show him as complicated and depict his camaraderie with Joel, admonishing his actions while endorsing the reasoning behind them: protecting his family. Some early versions depicted Tommy's drug deal, but the writers felt the conversation was more important. Critics praised Dalton's performance for his simultaneous warmth and firmness; many considered his casting as Pascal's father appropriate.

==== Eugene ====
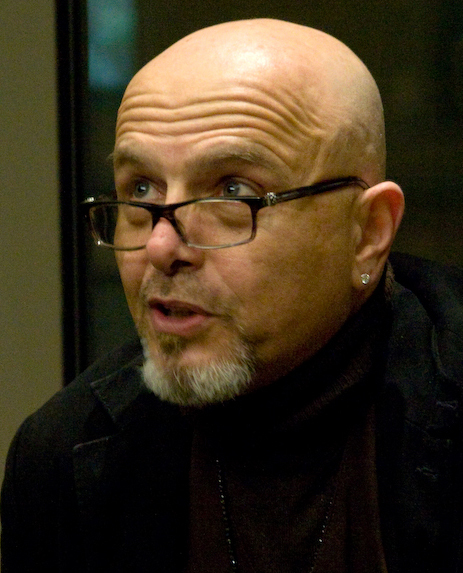
Joe Pantoliano portrays Eugene.

Eugene Lynden (Joe Pantoliano) is Gail's husband. He is a veteran of the Vietnam War and joined the Fireflies after the world collapsed but parted ways with them around 2010. According to Gail and Jesse, Joel killed him. Eugene is only seen in a photograph in The Last of Us Part II, when Ellie and Dina find his abandoned cannabis den. The writers foregrounded Eugene's role in the second season akin to Bill and Frank's standalone episode in the first; Druckmann felt the character's role in the game was "somewhat superficial", while his role in the series relates more closely to Joel and Ellie's relationship. Mazin found the use of existing characters to fulfill specific roles in the series appealing, like connecting Eugene to the protagonists. Eugene's character was partly adapted from Esther, a deleted character from the game with whom Joel had a romantic connection; he would have been forced to kill her after she was bitten. At Druckmann's request, Eugene's glasses are cracked in the shape of a lambda, a reference to the logo of the video game series Half-Life.

Mazin and Druckmann did not have a specific actor in mind to portray Eugene until their casting director presented a list that included Pantoliano; they felt he was the logical choice. When told about the role, Pantoliano originally thought it was for the series This Is Us, on which his friend Ken Olin was an executive producer. Pascal and Pantoliano had met about 25 years earlier, but the latter had forgotten until Pascal reminded him. His casting as Eugene was announced on March 5, 2025. Pantoliano was cast later in production, prompting Druckmann to avoid placing him alongside Ellie's poster of The Matrix (1999), in which Pantoliano stars. In the script, Eugene's scenes had more humor but Druckmann found it inappropriate after seeing Pantoliano's performance; he was surprised by the actor's versatility, adding "an innocence and a purity" to the role, acting more like a child as he gets closer to death. Pantoliano considered the role "the most challenging work [he has] had in a long time" due to the character's limited role and desperation. The writers decided not to feature Eugene and Gail together to underline their tragedy.

Critics praised Pantoliano's performance for its depth and understated nature despite his limited appearance; Kotaku's Shepard called it "one of the season's best performances". Pantoliano was nominated for Best Guest Actor in a Drama Series at the 5th Astra TV Awards and Outstanding Guest Actor in a Drama Series at the 77th Primetime Creative Arts Emmy Awards.
