= Convergence (The Last of Us) =

- The Last of Us episode
- Abby looks upon the WLF base as the series shifts to her perspective. The writers found the change risky but important, and the scene sparked mixed responses from critics.
- Episode no.: Season 2 Episode 7
- Directed by: Nina Lopez-Corrado
- Written by: Neil Druckmann; Halley Gross; Craig Mazin
- Cinematography by: Catherine Goldschmidt
- Editing by: Emily Mendez; Timothy A. Good
- Original air date: May 25, 2025
- Running time: 50 minutes

Guest appearances
- Jeffrey Wright as Isaac Dixon; Kaitlyn Dever as Abby; Spencer Lord as Owen; Danny Ramirez as Manny; Ariela Barer as Mel; Hettienne Park as Elise Park; Ben Ahlers as Burton

Episode chronology
← Previous "The Price"	Next → —
- The Last of Us season 2

"Convergence" is the seventh and final episode of the second season of the American post-apocalyptic drama television series The Last of Us. Written by Neil Druckmann, Halley Gross, and Craig Mazin, and directed by Nina Lopez-Corrado, it aired on HBO on May 25, 2025. The episode follows Ellie (Bella Ramsey) and Dina's (Isabela Merced) third day in Seattle to kill Abby (Kaitlyn Dever). They are joined by Jesse (Young Mazino), who seeks to regroup with Tommy (Gabriel Luna) and return home.

The episode was filmed in July and August 2024, primarily in Downtown Vancouver. The decision to end the season on a cliffhanger signifying the third-season change to Abby's perspective was written to match the game on which the season is based; the writers felt it remained the best way to tell the whole story. Critics praised the direction, cinematography, and Ramsey and Ariela Barer's performances; some considered the writing powerful and interesting while others found its changes unnecessary and ending abrupt. Ramsey submitted the episode to support their nomination for Lead Actress in a Drama Series at the 77th Primetime Emmy Awards. The episode was watched by 3.7 million viewers on its first day.

== Plot ==
Ellie returns to the theater after torturing Nora. (Note: As depicted in "Feel Her Love") She reveals to Dina that Joel massacred the Fireflies in Salt Lake City—including Abby's father—to save Ellie. (Note: Joel kills over a dozen Fireflies in a hospital in Salt Lake City to save Ellie in "Look for the Light", which he later admits to Ellie in "The Price".) Dina, unnerved, wants to return home. On Ellie's third day in Seattle, she and Jesse leave to find Tommy, arguing about Ellie's selfishness. Jesse prevents Ellie from interfering when Washington Liberation Front (WLF) soldiers assault a young member of the religious group Seraphites. Jesse discovers Dina is pregnant with his baby. He shares that he loved someone from a passing group who asked him to join her to Mexico, but he stayed in Jackson out of loyalty to the community.

The two scope out Seattle. Ellie spots an aquarium, and, from the information Nora gave her, realizes Abby is located there. Jesse angrily admits he voted against her proposition to avenge Joel (Note: As depicted in "The Path") to protect the community, stating Ellie does things for selfish reasons. Jesse searches for Tommy while Ellie heads for the aquarium. Meanwhile, WLF leader Isaac prepares the group to attack the Seraphites' island. He is worried about the disappearance of Abby's group, as Isaac wants Abby to succeed him when he dies.

En route to the aquarium, Ellie is hit by a giant wave and beaches on the Seraphites' island, where she is apprehended by the group. The WLF invasion diverts the Seraphites, and Ellie escapes. At the aquarium, she confronts Abby's friends Owen and Mel and demands Abby's whereabouts. Owen grabs a concealed gun to shoot her, but Ellie fatally shoots him and the bullet strikes Mel's neck. The pregnant Mel begs Ellie to save her baby via C-section but Ellie is too shocked to do so before Mel dies. Tommy and Jesse arrive to bring the distraught Ellie back to the theater.

Agreeing to return home, Ellie thanks Jesse for rescuing her and they reach a mutual understanding. They overhear a commotion and rush to the lobby. Jesse is fatally shot in the face by Abby, who has arrived at the theater to avenge her friends and holds Tommy at gunpoint. Ellie surrenders, admitting that she killed Abby's friends and was the person for whom Joel killed her father. Abby points her gun at Ellie, angrily telling her that she wasted her chance to live. A gunshot rings out.

Three days earlier, at the WLF base in a former sports stadium, Manny wakes Abby, having both been summoned by Isaac.

== Production ==
=== Conception and writing ===
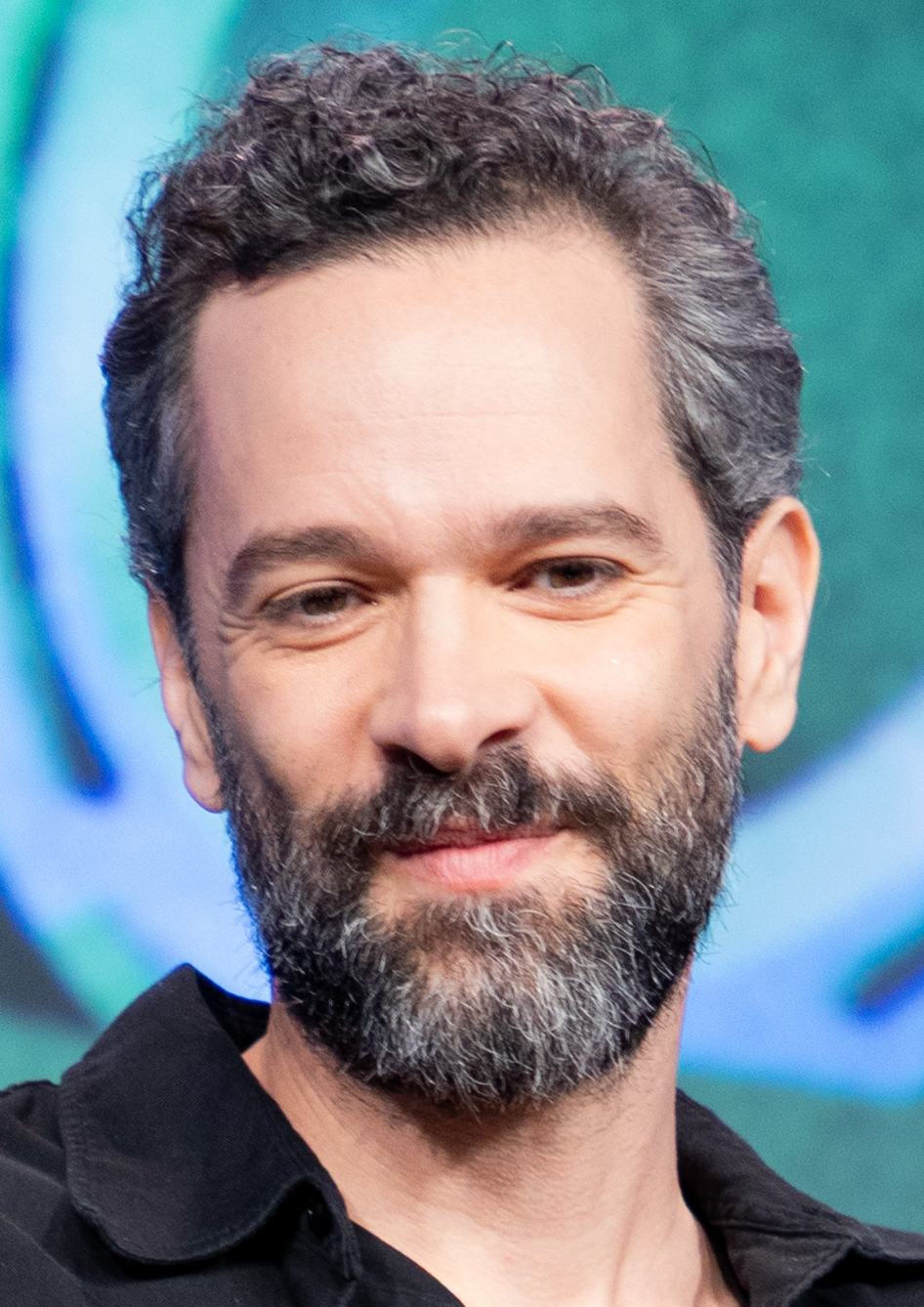
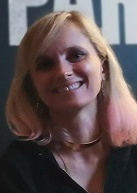
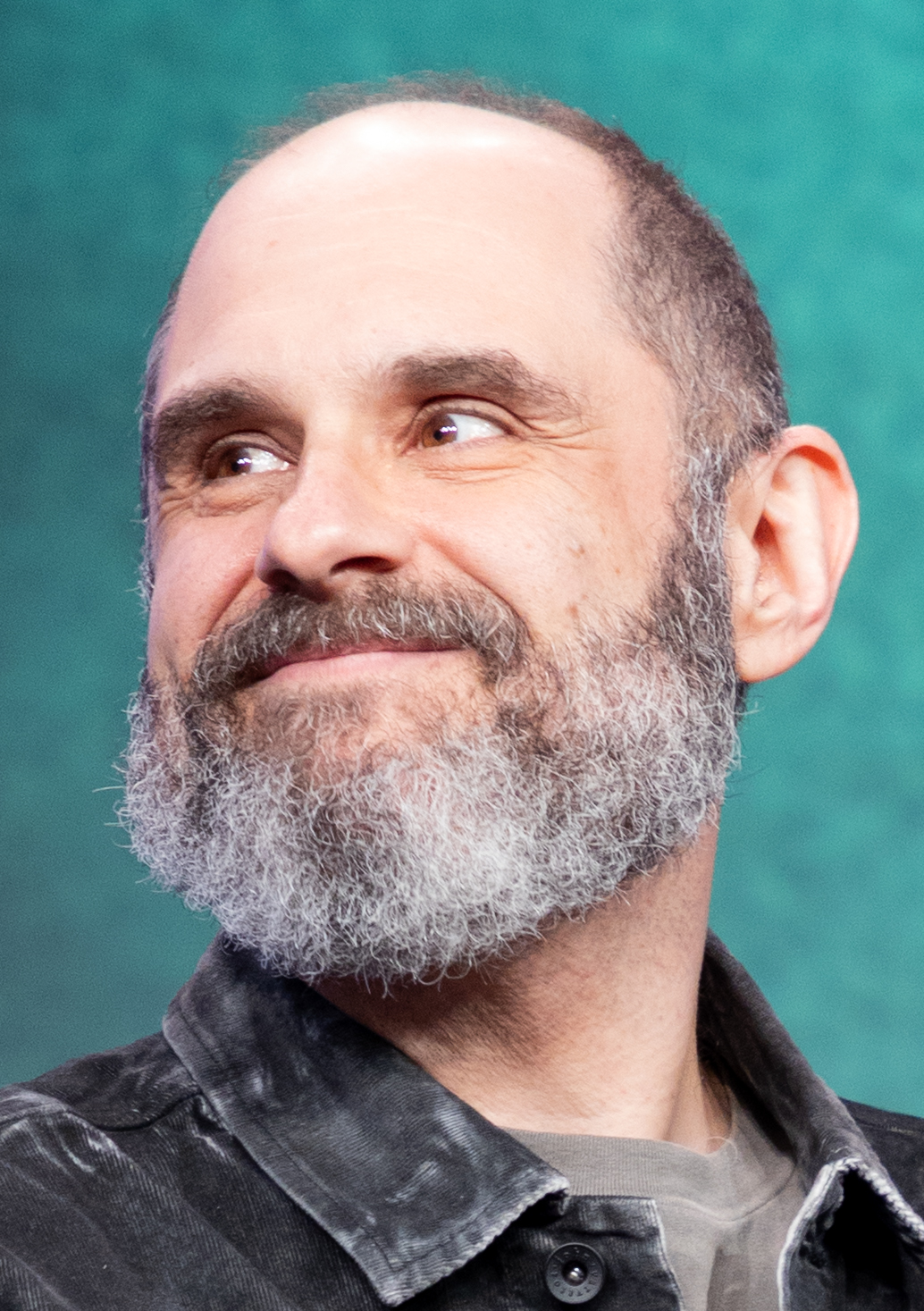
"Convergence" was written by (left to right) Neil Druckmann, Halley Gross, and Craig Mazin.

"Convergence" was written by Neil Druckmann, Halley Gross, and Craig Mazin, and directed by Nina Lopez-Corrado. Druckmann and Mazin co-created the television series; Druckmann co-directed The Last of Us Part II (2020), the video game on which the second season is based, and co-wrote it with Gross. Mazin found the title reflective of the episode's events, being spoken in dialogue in reference to a convergence zone. The credits feature the song "Burden in My Hand" by Soundgarden; to Mazin, its lyrics implied similarities between Ellie and Abby, prompting interesting questions about whether they would be close if they had known each other.

Mazin felt the flashbacks depicted in the preceding episode might have occurred in Ellie's mind as she returns to the theater after torturing Nora. When Ellie admits to Dina that torturing Nora came easy to her, Druckmann disagreed with Mazin's interpretation, feeling Ellie lies to herself to imitate Joel's strength but is actually haunted by her actions. Nora saying two words to Ellie while being tortured—eventually leading Ellie to the aquarium—was Gross's idea. The scene of Ellie on the Seraphites' island was not included in the game; it had been written in early drafts but later cut. Mazin found the inclusion of the Seraphite child ordering Ellie's death on the island representative of innocent children being indoctrinated into extreme tribalism during war without a chance to view others without negativity. In the game, Ellie kills the WLF's dog Alice as it attacks her; the scene was omitted from the episode as the writers felt the live-action violence was more visceral, and the aquarium sequence being placed between several heavy moments made Alice's death "probably one too many".

Druckmann thought Ellie admitting that she knew about Joel's actions recontextualizes the scene in "Day One" in which Dina agrees to continue hunting Abby despite being pregnant: by withholding the information earlier, Ellie removed Dina's agency in making the decision with the full context, akin to Joel removing Ellie's agency in making a decision in the first-season finale. Mazin similarly found Ellie's admission similar to Joel's in the preceding episode, not wanting to tell the truth in fear of losing their loved ones; he noticed Dina turns from Ellie similar to the way in which Ellie turns from Joel in the first-season finale. Isabela Merced, who portrays Dina, felt the character reacted similar to how Ellie reacted when she found out. Gross recognized that Dina "extends [an] olive branch" in the following scene with a maturity that took Ellie years to achieve.

The writers compared Ellie's obsession with finding Abby—despite the people and duties around her demanding otherwise—to an addiction, which Druckmann and Gross had considered when writing the game. They thought Ellie had accepted the need to regroup with Tommy and return home, but seeing the aquarium prompts her to relapse to continue her revenge quest. Mazin felt Ellie undergoes several stages in the scene in which she sees the aquarium, entering a state of denial which prompts an argument that sounds convincing, then turning it around on Jesse when called out on it. Druckmann found it demonstrative of her hypocrisy as she seeks revenge for the death of her "community" (Joel) yet refuses to help Jesse look for another member of their community (Tommy).

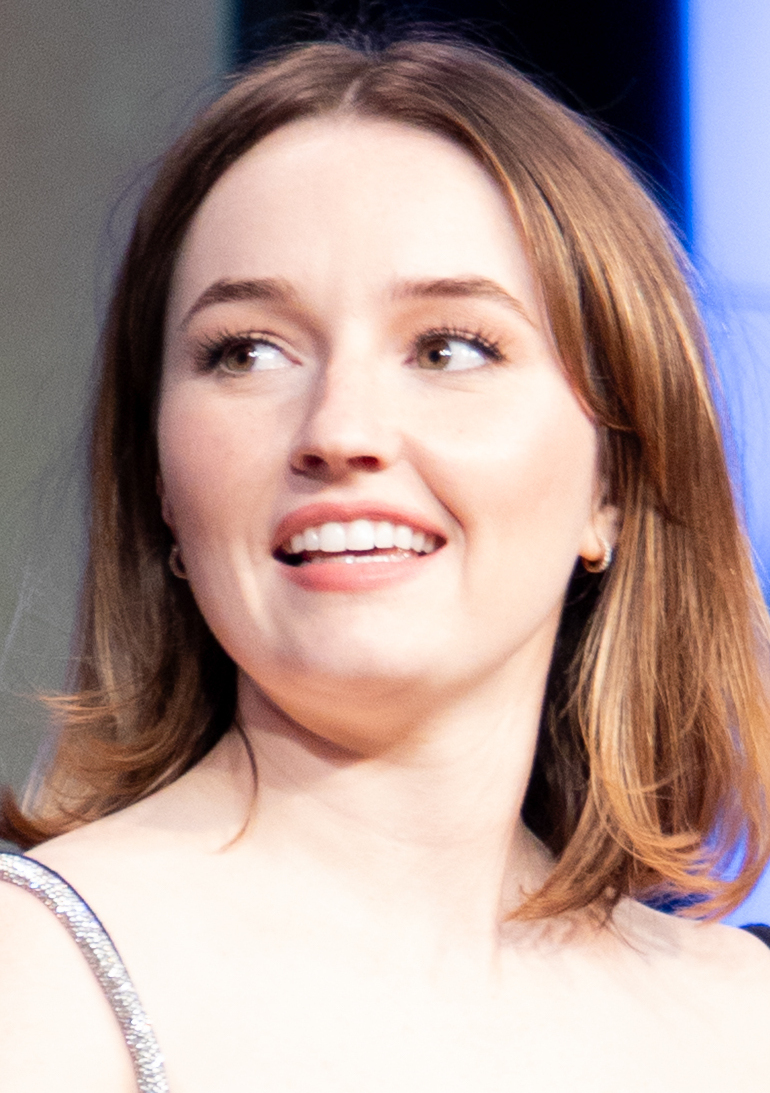
The episode marked the series's shift to focus on the perspective of Abby, portrayed by Kaitlyn Dever.

Mazin thought the season's cliffhanger ending—signifying the following season's change to Abby's perspective—was risky, but felt HBO executives "understand that this show is going to be a different show every season". The writers were open to a different ending, considering interlacing Ellie and Abby's stories throughout the season, but Mazin wanted to maintain "the genetics of how this story functions". He thought they were "breaking quite a few rules" of television but felt "that is the point" of the series, reinforcing that the concept of protagonists and villains is inherently flawed. Druckmann said, like with the game, the upcoming context of Abby's perspective is necessary before her confrontation with Ellie continues. He compared the ending to the fifth episode teasing the sixth's flashbacks: the second-season ending establishes the "epic nature" of the third and its focus on Abby.

=== Casting and characters ===
Bella Ramsey, who portrays Ellie, felt "the actual feeling of the rope" around their neck while filming with the Seraphites made the sequence more immersive. In killing Mel, Ramsey thought Ellie "realizes she has become all of the parts of [Joel] that she never wanted to become", finally seeing the consequences of her actions and comparing Mel to Dina due to their pregnancies. They found the scene "way more quiet and intimate and still" than Joel's death in "Through the Valley". It was one of their proudest scenes, feeling Ellie "goes from being sort of a villain to just a lost human being"; they believed Ellie, still remorseful over torturing Nora, never intended to kill Owen or Mel. The writers were fascinated with the extremes of Ellie's willpower: despite torturing Nora without hesitation, she is unable to gather the willpower to perform a C-section on Mel, regressing to a child; Gross considered it indicative of Ellie ultimately not being like Joel. Ramsey found the final scene complex to film, requiring several takes. In conversations with Mazin and Lopez-Corrado, they sought to find the balance of Ellie's trauma of Jesse's death and the shock of Abby's appearance, having sought to kill her for months; they considered this—with the added challenge of Ellie's grief switching to submission—"one of the hardest things" to perform, and felt the scene's abrupt ending made it difficult to finish filming. Ramsey was not aware of the gunshot cliffhanger until after the episode was released.

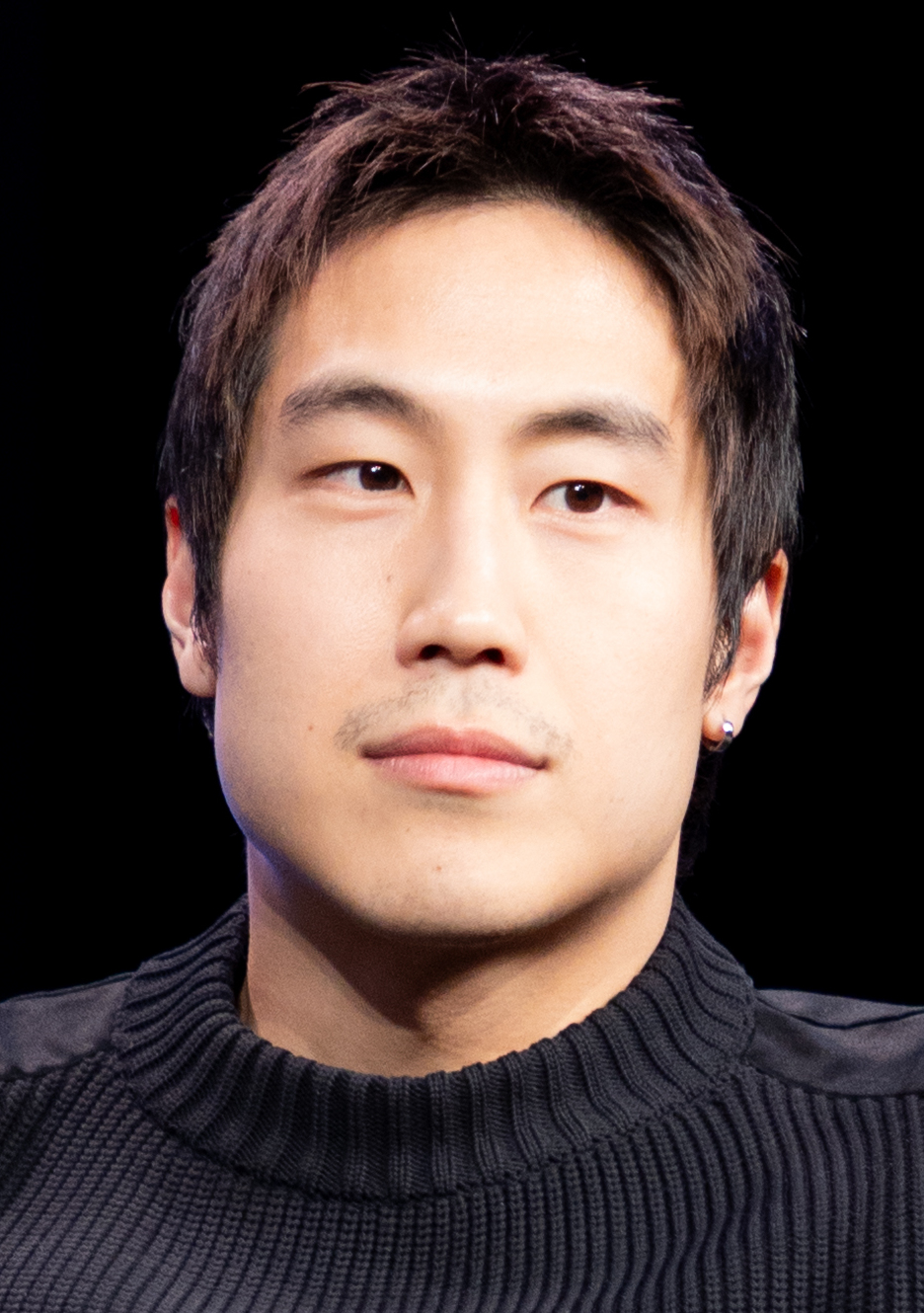
Young Mazino chose to perform the stunts of Jesse's death himself, including in reshoots when given the option to be replaced by a stunt double.

Young Mazino, who portrays Jesse, said he personally would have been "filled with dread and terror" upon discovering Dina's pregnancy but played the scene "more contained", thinking Jesse would have "a tight feeling of 'Let's get this done so I can get the fuck out of here'". He felt similarly about Jesse's reaction to the Seraphite child being assaulted, removing emotion to focus on his objectives. In that scene, Gross thought Jesse prioritized his family while Ellie wanted justice, and Lopez-Corrado felt Ellie saw herself in the child, having been saved by Joel and wanting to do the same. Jesse was exasperated at Ellie's decision to continue hunting Abby, understanding her reasoning but feeling they had a better chance at leaving. Jesse tells Ellie that he voted against her proposition "with some relish and some satisfaction", as he is actively breaking his own rules and defying the vote to save Ellie and Dina. Mazino thought Jesse was sad as they depart, suspecting Ellie will likely die. He felt Jesse was jealous of Ellie's precocious nature; unaware of her immunity, he notices that she acts casual about serious events, admiring the lengths to which she goes to avenge her loved ones. Mazino found Jesse and Ellie's conversation at the theater emotional as it was filmed towards the end of the season's production.

Jesse's death was filmed at the same theater location on a different day. Mazino wanted to perform the stunts himself, including in shots where it was not necessary, though found it exhausting by the "15th, 20th" takes. The scene required reshooting to match continuity as Ramsey's lip was injured in an action scene; Mazino was given the option to be replaced by a stunt double but chose to attend as he felt Ellie seeing Jesse's lifeless body is "a catastrophic moment" and wanted Ramsey to connect with his physicality. He had clay prosthetics on his face in the scene. The writers did not consider alternatives to Jesse's death and prepared Mazino for the scene early in the season's production. After being cast, Mazino played the game until Jesse's death before stopping. He found its abrupt nature indicative of the world's brutality and did not wish to change it, considering it reflective of the notion of sonder in the realization that each individual has their own complex life and death. The writers compared Jesse to Owen in that they are both moral characters who have tied themselves to impulsive people—Ellie and Abby, respectively—which ultimately costs them their lives. Mazin thought Jesse's actions would have been identical to Owen's in that situation. He told Spencer Lord, who portrays Owen, to grab the gun as fast as possible; Owen knew the situation was risky but felt he had to try anyway.

Mazin wrote Mel's death to be darker in the episode than the game; Druckmann felt it was necessary to show the impact of collateral damage. He thought Ellie could justify all of her actions until now, but the death of a child was unjustifiable. Mazin warned the actors about the scene's brutality after writing it. Early drafts were "more heightened" with additional action. Ariela Barer, who portrays Mel, was nervous about the scene and continually cried. It required refilming months later, which Barer understood after watching the original version. Barer was nervous again about refilming but was comforted by her friend, who related it to real events: "these horrible things happen for real. Women suffer this way in wartime. The least you can do is honor that." Mazin gave her additional lines during filming, such as Mel encouraging Ellie. He told her that tears were appropriate but Mel should not cry as she immediately becomes a parent quickly trying to save her child. Druckmann found the direction similar to one he gave Troy Baker while recording the first game: when Sarah is shot, Joel is focused on saving her instead of mourning her death.

Barer felt Mel "sees herself in Ellie—someone who is forced into doing something by the circumstances of her life", referring to her participation in Joel's death. She portrayed the scene as if Mel gradually loses her senses, starting with her vision, but continues using medical language as if "she's on the operating table with her doctor friends who she trusts", and ultimately "dies thinking that she saved the baby". Mel's dying wish to save her child is reflective of the series's theme of "parents doing whatever they can to save their child". The writers did not seek for the audience to agree with Ellie in the scene. While Ellie physically fights and kills both characters in the game, the scene was rewritten in the episode as the writers considered it unrealistic that Ellie could successfully fight Owen considering her size. Gross found the scene a reflection of the opening scene of Dina begging Jesse to remove the arrow from her leg. The mirroring was more explicit in early drafts, particularly imitating the act of labor.

Kaitlyn Dever, who portrays Abby, was nervous about her performance due to the limited dialogue, feeling "if you screw it up, the whole scene is screwed up because of your one line"; she felt the scene's limited context meant she had to make "every word ... really matter". Having not yet performed Abby's perspective of the preceding three days (depicted in the third season), Dever had to imagine and visualize the events, referencing the game's version. It was her last work for the season; traveling between production in Vancouver and home in Los Angeles meant she "constantly had to recalibrate" to return to Abby's emotions, typically recalling the character's monologue to Joel in "Through the Valley". Mazin felt Abby's brief scenes in the episode demonstrated her competence in contrasts to Ellie's, becoming immediately in control of their confrontation in the theater. Gross thought Ellie saw herself in Abby in the final scenes, witnessing the pain and rage that she experienced herself after Joel's death.

=== Filming ===
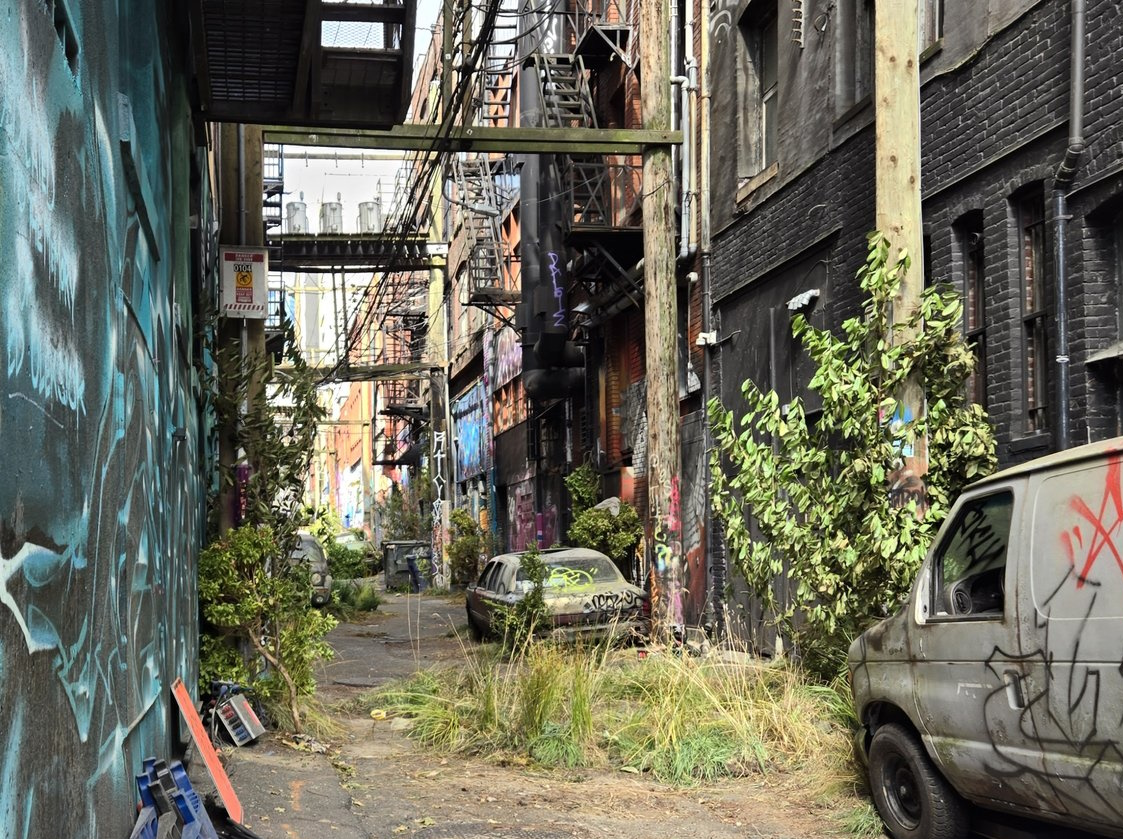
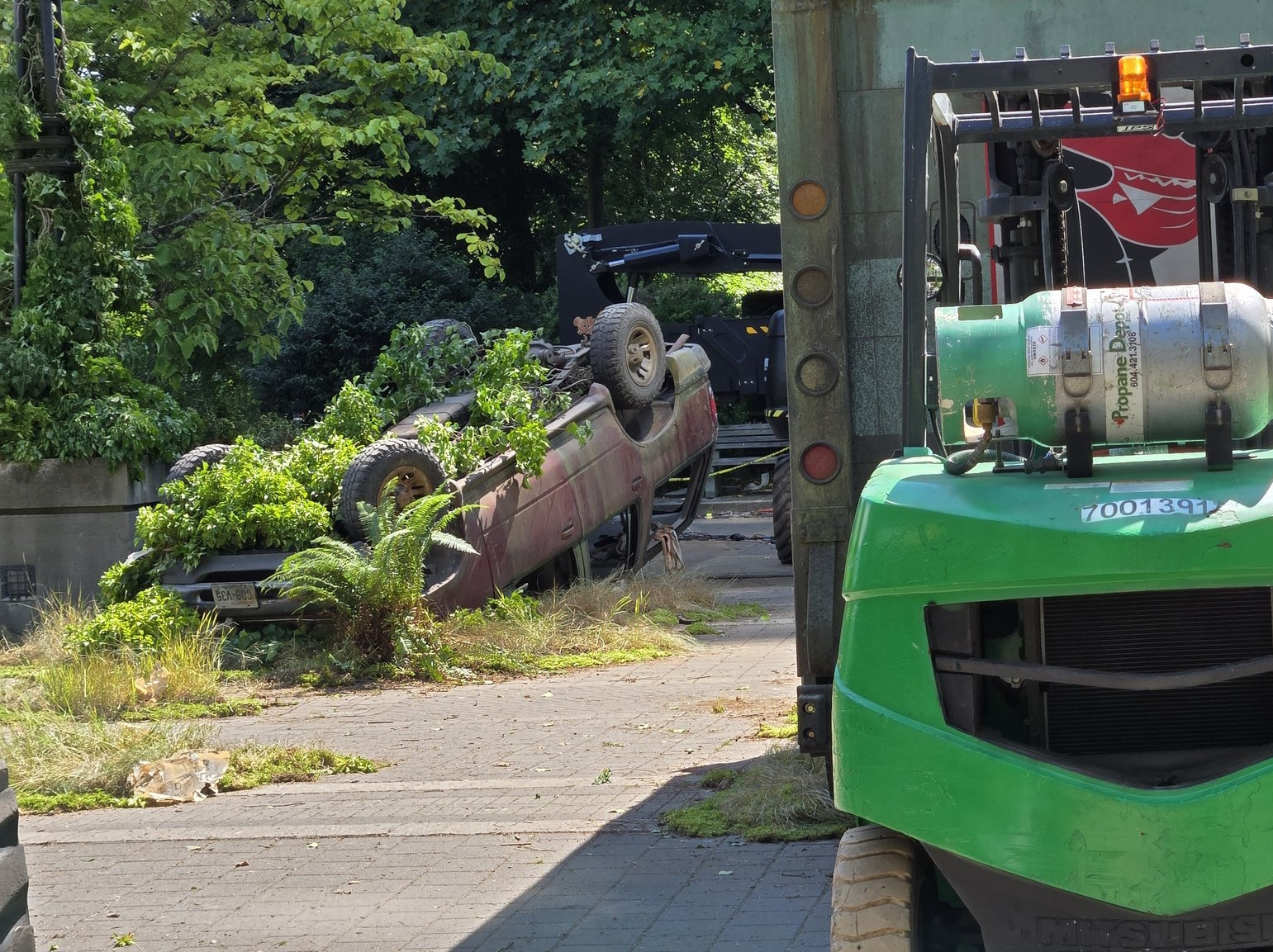
Filming took place in Downtown Vancouver in July and August 2024.

Production for the episode began around July 2024. Catherine Goldschmidt worked as the director of photography. Filming occurred in New Westminster on July 28, at the Orpheum theater on July 29, where the cast and crew "jammed out" in the days before production. Filming took place around Cordova and Cambie Streets in Gastown from August 9–13. The scenes of Ellie in the boat were filmed towards the end of production in a heated water tank in a studio, and on a gimbal without water for some shots. The camera movement is more energetic to reflect the water's intensity. Ramsey found their heavy and wet costume made the sequences difficult—made worse by bronchitis, from which they had recently recovered—but satisfying.

The Seraphites' island forest was built on a soundstage. Goldschmidt lightly applied Vaseline to the camera lens to add emotion and a rainy effect to the scene. Principal photography was set to conclude August 21, several weeks before September 9 as originally scheduled; it ultimately wrapped on August 23. The Vancouver Aquarium closed early for additional photography on January 15–16, 2025, to reshoot Owen and Mel's death scene; it originally took place in a different environment but required refilming as "it didn't work". Three versions of the scene were ultimately filmed, each taking two days. Production designer Don Macaulay felt using an actual aquarium was more effective than building the sets.

Visual effects team DNEG worked with Seattle-based Motion State to capture drone footage of the aquarium and Great Wheel, which were fully recreated using computer-generated imagery to match the pier scenes filmed on a backlot. Around 70 water shots were digitally created in late 2024; Roberto Rodricks led an effects team with experience in animating water, while Casey Gorton and Heather Ruttan led the lighting and rendering processes in Solaris and RenderMan. Nine digital doubles of WLF soldiers were created for the scene based on 3D scans of the actors, each with four costume sets. The WLF base in the final scene was partly constructed for Abby to walk through, while the background was illustrated by the visual effects department, based on Lumen Field; it is set to be built for the third season but the team opted for digital creation for the episode.

== Reception ==
=== Broadcast and ratings ===
The episode aired on HBO on May 25, 2025. Users who purchased the season from Apple briefly gained access to the episode on May 22, and clips were subsequently posted on social media platforms like TikTok and Twitter. Mazin and Druckmann attended a virtual press conference on May 23 to answer questions about the series. The marketing agency Biborg partnered with Max for two screenings of the episode at MK2 Nation on May 26. The 450-people screenings, established to allow viewers to avoid spoilers, featured a discussion with comedian Baptiste Lecaplain. Biborg partnered with Webedia on an influencer program to promote the screening.

The episode had 3.7 million viewers in the United States on its first night, including linear viewers and streams on Max—a 55% decrease from the first-season finale and a 30% drop from the second-season premiere, which HBO attributed to the Memorial Day weekend, expecting viewership to grow later based on previous figures. On linear television, the episode had 680,000 viewers, with a 0.17 ratings share. The series was the most-viewed across all streaming services for the following week, and the eleventh-most-viewed for overall watch time, with 661 million minutes streamed on Max. It was among the most in-demand shows in Canada, with more than 57 times the average television demand the preceding week and 56 times the following week.

=== Critical response ===
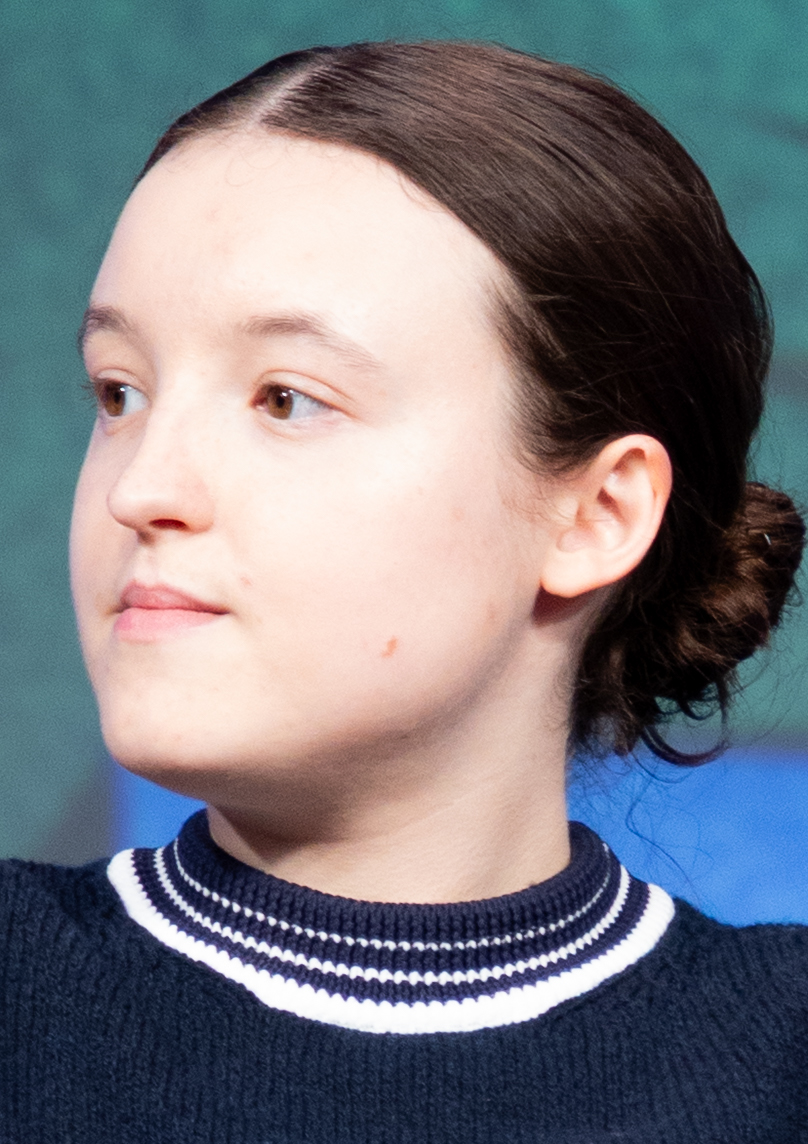
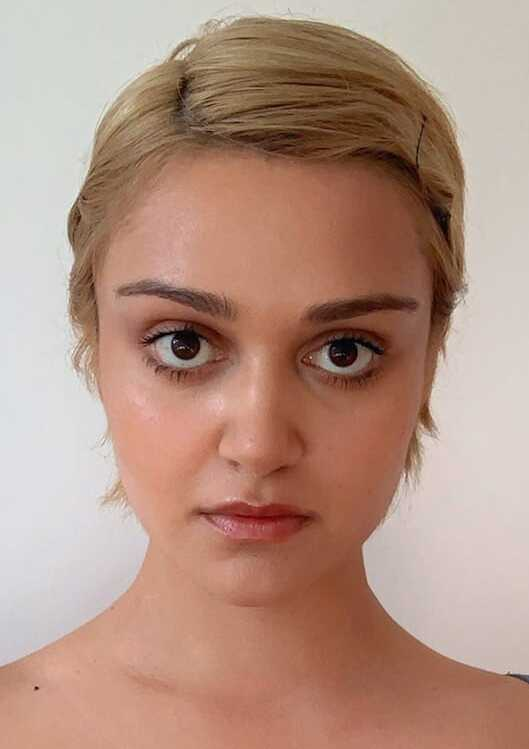
Critics praised the performances of Bella Ramsey (left) and Ariela Barer (right) in Mel's death, making the scene powerful and devastating.

"Convergence" has an approval rating of 75% on review aggregator Rotten Tomatoes based on 24 reviews, with a 6.9/10 average rating. The website's critical consensus called it "a definitively brutal yet veering end". IGN's Simon Cardy found it difficult to judge the story's effectiveness of the story without the context of the third season. The A.V. Club's Saloni Gajjar called the episode the season's "shakiest", and Mashable's Belen Edwards considered it a "letdown": the "cherry on top of an underwhelming season" that would have benefitted from more episodes. NPR's Eric Deggans felt the season was too focused on converging Ellie and Abby's stories instead of familiarizing audiences with the latter. The New York Times's Noel Murray praised the cinematography, citing the shot of Ellie looking at the aquarium and the final shot of the stadium, and The Telegraph's Chris Bennion felt the shot of Ellie in the boat "should win the design team awards". CBR's Katie Doll lauded the use of lightning in dark scenes.

Critics praised Ramsey's performance; IGN's Cardy felt they displayed "a sternness and personality that far outsize their stature" in confronting Jesse, and The Daily Beast's Emma Fraser wrote that Ramsey "excels at showing the horror" of Mel's death, which The Telegraph's Bennion called "easily Ramsey's finest moment in the series". Ramsey submitted the episode to support their Lead Actress in a Drama Series nomination at the 77th Primetime Emmy Awards. Barer's performance was praised for its powerful devastation, and critics appreciated Mazino's maturity challenging Ellie's behavior. Eurogamer's Victoria Phillips Kennedy wrote that Dever "steals the scene with Abby's return", noting she conveys the character's strength even without the larger build of her in-game counterpart, and Vanity Fair's Joshua Rivera felt "she seethes with palpable range" despite the scene's brevity. Jeffrey Wright's brief scenes as Isaac led CBR's Doll to hope for a more significant third-season role.

The A.V. Club's Caroline Siede called the episode "a strong hour of The Last of Us " and the deaths "effective in their quiet, underplayed brutality". CBR's Doll found its pacing more akin to a game than television, criticizing the focus on the love triangle, though she felt Isaac's dialogue demonstrated "the show's finest writing" in its subtlety and the character's ordinary nature. The Telegraph's Bennion considered the episode an encapsulation of the season: "containing drippy longueurs ... and far too much ostentatious discussion of morality", though he found Mel's death "perhaps the most powerful scene the show has delivered yet", demonstrating the franchise's "vision of a society that has almost, but not quite lost its humanity". While Ellie defensively stabs Mel in the game, several reviewers felt her accidental death in the episode made Ellie more sympathetic and less complicit; IGN's Cardy called it "another example of this adaptation pulling its punches when it comes to moments of pure violence, numbing the impact of the story". Kotaku's Kenneth Shepard disliked the series placing Ellie's unlikable traits onto others to make her more heroic—such as Jesse becoming more selfish than in the game—though he found Ellie's disillusionment with the Jackson community an appropriate addition due to their unfair treatment of her. Some found Ellie's scene on the Seraphites' island unnecessary and her survival implausible.

While some critics appreciated the confidence in the episode's ending switch perspective to Abby, considering it a fitting tease for future episodes, others found it unsatisfying and felt it made the second season's story feel incomplete, particularly in light of the long production time between seasons; The A.V. Club's Siede had hoped for "a sense of thematic finality", and Rolling Stone's Alan Sepinwall criticized the "transparently phony cliffhanger" of the gunshot. Time's Judy Berman called the episode "abrupt and unsatisfying", not appropriate for a season finale; she unfavorably compared it to Squid Game's "glacially paced" second season which "ends just as the action is ramping up". Several reviewers questioned the second season's focus on specific groups and characters only to switch perspectives in the third; The A.V. Club's Siede found the lack of focus on Abby's group "arbitrary", and Mashable's Edwards felt Isaac's scenes "feel disjointed" without any payoff. TheWrap's Alex Welch called the episode "a fittingly jarring end to a season that has, unfortunately, felt disjointed and clunky for much of its run".
