= The Last of Us season 3 =

The Last of Us
- Season 3
- Showrunner: Craig Mazin
- Starring: Kaitlyn Dever; Bella Ramsey; Gabriel Luna; Isabela Merced; Young Mazino; Spencer Lord; Tati Gabrielle; Ariela Barer; Michelle Mao; Kyriana Kratter

Release
- Original network: HBO

Season chronology
- ← Previous; Season 2

The third season of the American post-apocalyptic drama television series The Last of Us is set to premiere on HBO in 2027. Based on the video game franchise developed by Naughty Dog, the season is set twenty-five years into a pandemic caused by a mass fungal infection, which causes its hosts to transform into zombie-like creatures and collapses society. The third season, based on the second half of the 2020 game The Last of Us Part II, follows Abby (Kaitlyn Dever), a soldier in Seattle who has her worldview challenged after attaining revenge for her father's death.

HBO renewed The Last of Us for a third season before the second-season premiere in April 2025. Co-showrunner Neil Druckmann, who wrote and co-directed the games, stepped away from production alongside writers Halley Gross and Bo Shim; co-creator Craig Mazin remained as the sole showrunner, joined in the writers' room by Ryan James and Alexandra Cheng. Principal photography began in British Columbia in March 2026 and is set to conclude in February 2027. Mazin returned to direct alongside newcomers including Andrew Bernstein, Hiromi Kamata, Vincenzo Natali, and David Petrarca.

== Cast and characters ==
=== Main ===
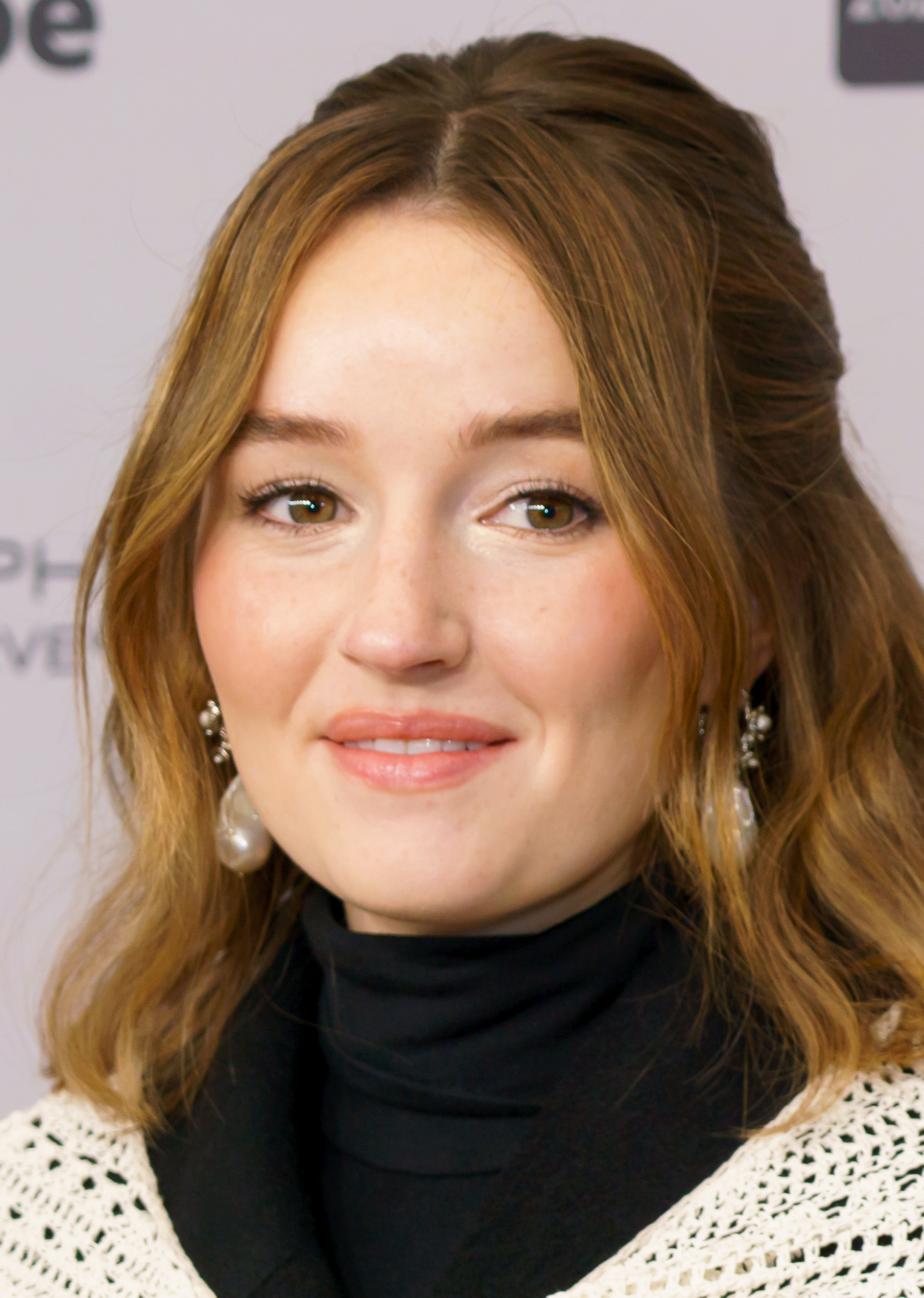
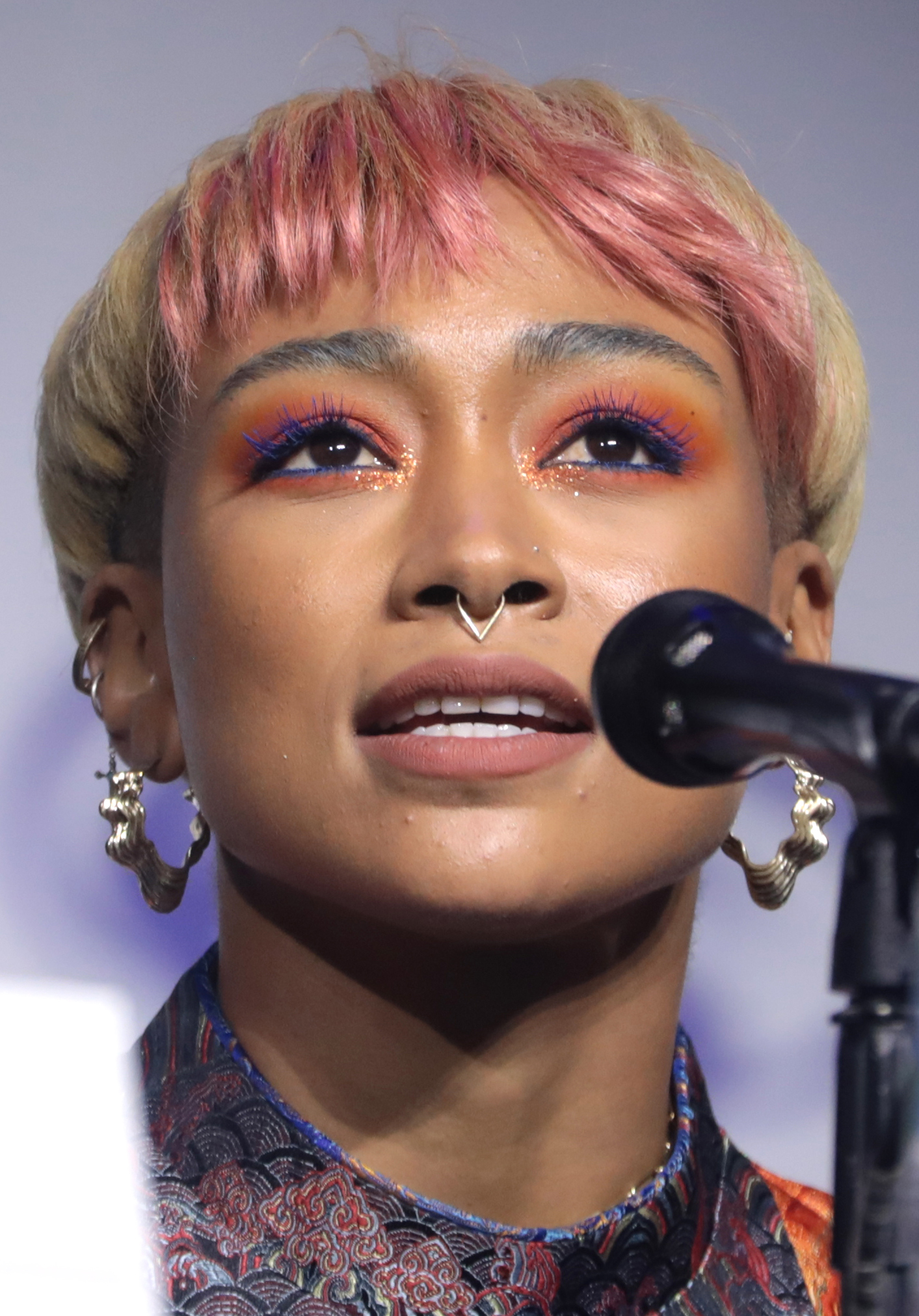
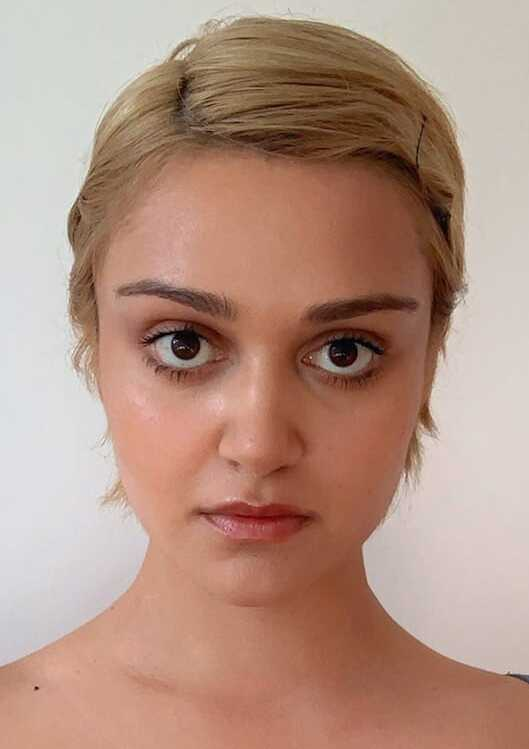
Kaitlyn Dever (left), Tati Gabrielle (center), Ariela Barer (right), and Spencer Lord were promoted to series regulars for the third season alongside newcomers Michelle Mao and Kyriana Kratter.
- Kaitlyn Dever as Abby, a Washington Liberation Front (WLF) soldier who has her worldview challenged after killing Joel for her father's death
- Bella Ramsey as Ellie, a 19-year-old who is immune to the Cordyceps infection and is seeking revenge for the murder of Joel
- Gabriel Luna as Tommy Miller, Joel's younger brother. A former member of the revolutionary group Fireflies, he maintains idealism in hoping for a better world.
- Isabela Merced as Dina, Ellie's girlfriend and Jesse's ex. She is a freewheeling spirit with a loyalty towards Ellie, which is challenged by the world's brutality.
- Young Mazino as Jesse, Dina's ex and a leader in Jackson whose selflessness sometimes comes at a cost. He values its sense of community and works hard to ensure it is not lost.
- Spencer Lord as Owen, a WLF member and former Firefly. He is a gentle person whose physical strength forces him to fight enemies he does not hate.
- Tati Gabrielle as Nora, a WLF military medic and former Firefly who has difficulty accepting her past behavior
- Ariela Barer as Mel, a former Firefly and Owen's girlfriend. She is a doctor in the WLF committed to her role while struggling with the realities of war, reluctant to hurt others.
- Michelle Mao as Yara, a member of the Seraphites. She is Lev's sister who meets Abby on her journey.
- Kyriana Kratter as Lev, a member of the Seraphites. He is a 13-year-old transgender boy and Yara's brother.

=== Recurring ===
- Jeffrey Wright as Isaac Dixon, the ruthless leader of the WLF and a former high-ranking sergeant for the Federal Disaster Response Agency (FEDRA). The WLF face a war in their pursuit for liberty. Wright reprises his role from the video game.
- Jorge Lendeborg Jr. as Manny, a WLF member and former Firefly. A loyal soldier who fears failing his friends, he maintains a jovial attitude despite the pain of his past. Danny Ramirez portrayed the character in the second season but was recast due to scheduling conflicts.
- Jason Ritter as Hanley, a WLF soldier. Ritter previously had a cameo appearance in the first season as a clicker.
- Patrick Wilson as Jerry, Abby's father whom Joel killed. The character was briefly portrayed by Darren Dolynski in the first-season finale.
- Peter Sarsgaard as Amon, a leader of the Seraphites

=== Guest ===
- Clea DuVall as a member of the Seraphites, a religious group based in Seattle
- Li Jun Li as Miriam, a member of the Seraphites and Yara and Lev's mother
- John Goodman as Joey, part of a "friendly duo" who call themselves "Heroes of the Highway"
- Ian Alexander as Paco, part of the "Heroes of the Highway". Alexander previously portrayed Lev in The Last of Us Part II.
- Laura Bailey as Elizabeth, a leader of the Seraphites. Bailey previously portrayed Abby in Part II, as well as a nurse in the first game and the first-season finale.

== Production ==
=== Development ===
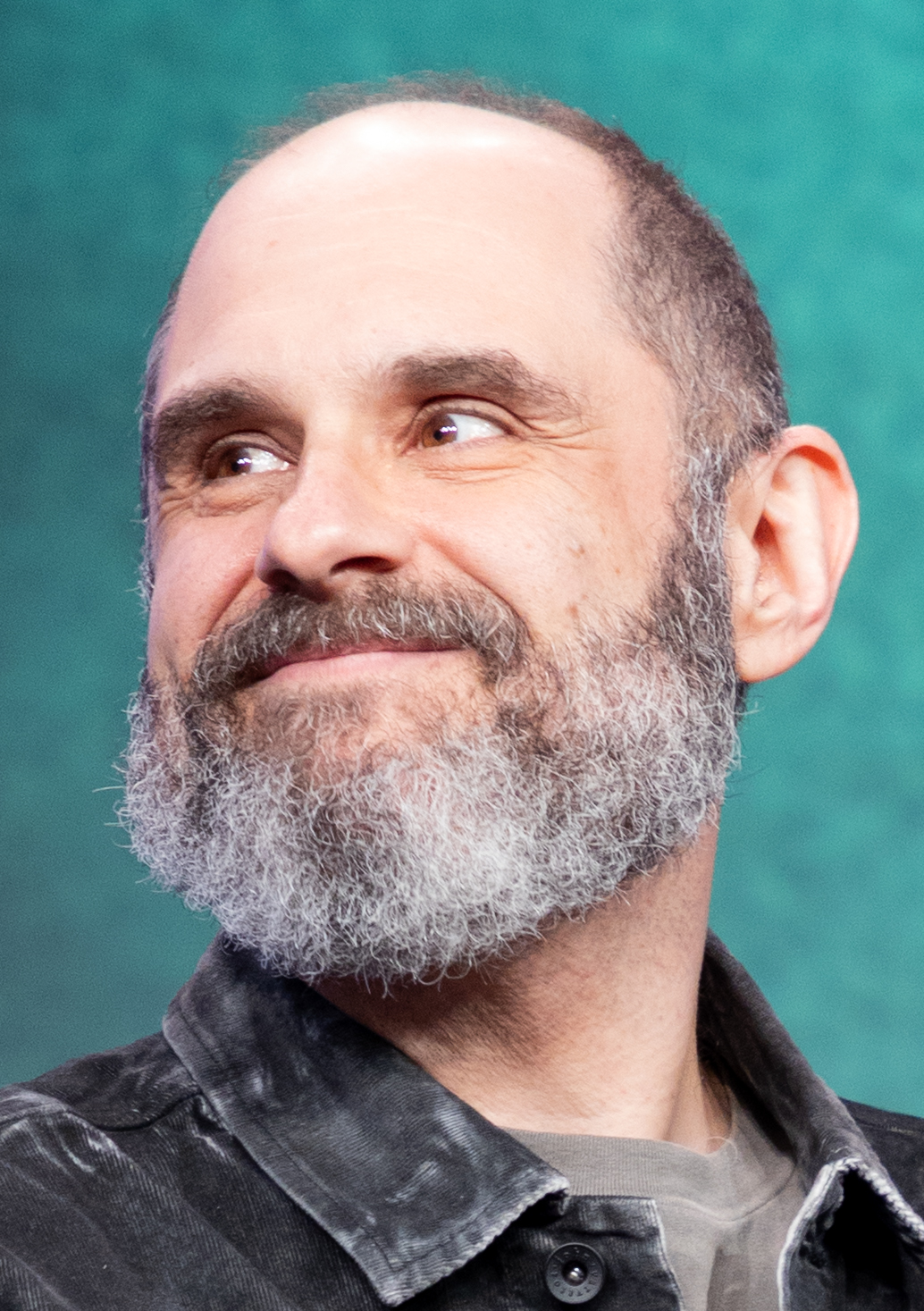
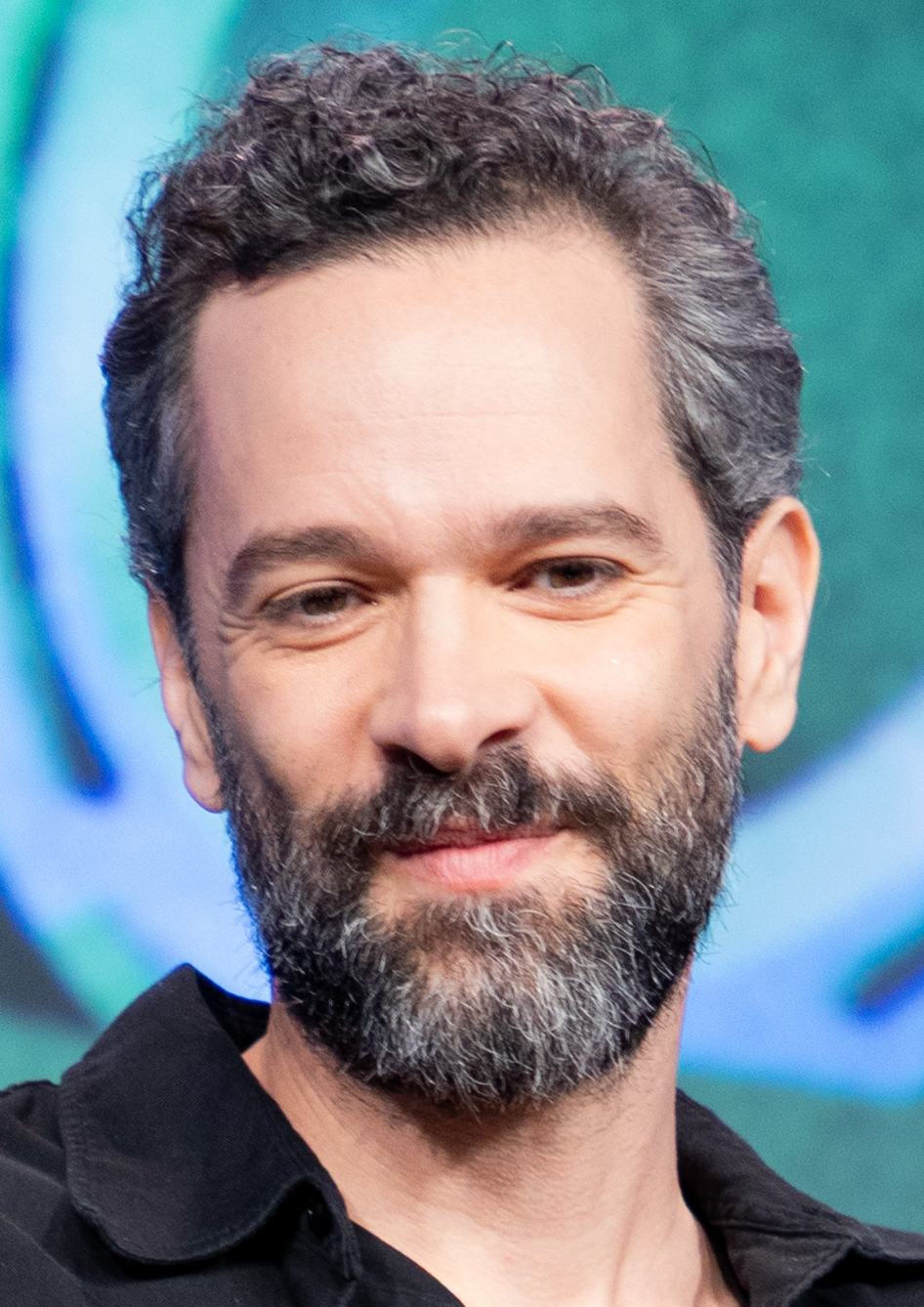
Craig Mazin (left) remained as the sole showrunner of The Last of Us's third season after the departure of Neil Druckmann (right), who wrote and co-directed the video games.

HBO renewed The Last of Us for a third season on April 9, 2025, several days before the premiere of the second season. The season covers the second half of Naughty Dog's video game The Last of Us Part II (2020), and is set to be longer and "significantly larger" than the second season. Co-showrunner Neil Druckmann, who wrote and co-directed the games, stepped away from his creative duties on the series in July 2025 to focus on his work at Naughty Dog, primarily Intergalactic: The Heretic Prophet; neither Druckmann nor Naughty Dog were creatively involved in the season. Craig Mazin remained as sole showrunner; he directed the premiere to set the tone, inspired by Noah Hawley's work on Fargo, and hoped to direct more if he had time. Other directors include Andrew Bernstein, Hiromi Kamata, Vincenzo Natali, and David Petrarca.

The series is a production of Sony Pictures Television, PlayStation Productions, Naughty Dog, the Mighty Mint, and Word Games, with Mazin, Druckmann, Carolyn Strauss, Jacqueline Lesko, Cecil O'Connor, Asad Qizilbash, Carter Swan, and Evan Wells returning as executive producers. Halley Gross, who co-wrote Part II and worked on the second season as writer and co-executive producer, was named an executive producer in May 2025. The season is produced by Leeann Stonebreaker. Druckmann and HBO's Casey Bloys indicated that the season would be the last. The show's narrative is not set to overtake the games. Gustavo Santaolalla, who worked on the games, is set to return to compose the score.

=== Casting ===
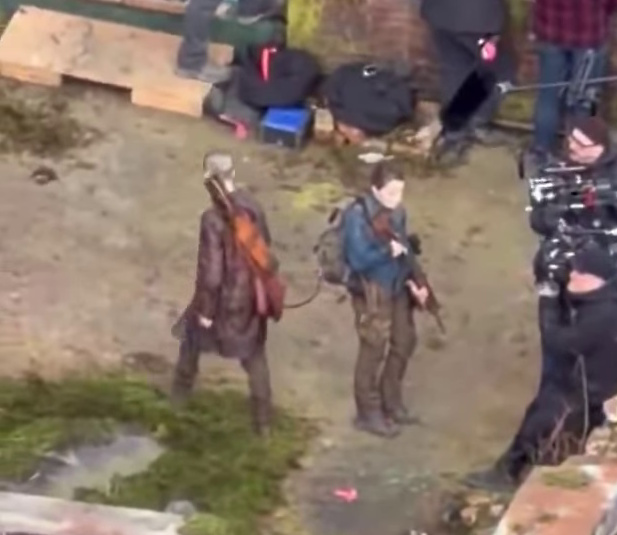
Kyriana Kratter and Kaitlyn Dever as Lev and Abby in Gastown in March 2026

Kaitlyn Dever was told of the shift to Abby's perspective when she got the role for the second season, and Danny Ramirez, who played Manny in the second season, was told about the character's significant third-season presence when auditioning; he departed the role in December 2025 due to scheduling conflicts, recast with Jorge Lendeborg Jr. in February 2026. The season is set to show more of Isaac (Jeffrey Wright) and his leadership style.

Ellie (Bella Ramsey) has a smaller role than previous seasons due to the perspective shift; Gabriel Luna found the shift interesting as his character, Tommy, "becomes kind of like the boogeyman to these other people" after being a hero for the first two seasons. He described Ramsey as the set's "general" following Pedro Pascal's departure as Joel in the second season. Catherine O'Hara had been set to reprise her role as Gail before her death in January 2026.

Clea DuVall's casting was announced in February. A casting call was distributed, seeking background performers to portray archers, blacksmiths, chandlers, farriers, and potters (with male actors willing to have shaved heads) from May to July 2026. In March, Jason Ritter and Patrick Wilson's casting was announced, alongside Barer, Gabrielle, and Lord's promotion to series regulars, followed by Michelle Mao and Kyriana Kratter's casting. A large casting call was held for Lev, featuring actors of several backgrounds. Li Jun Li's casting was announced in April, followed by Peter Sarsgaard's in June, and Ian Alexander, Laura Bailey, and John Goodman's in September.

=== Writing ===
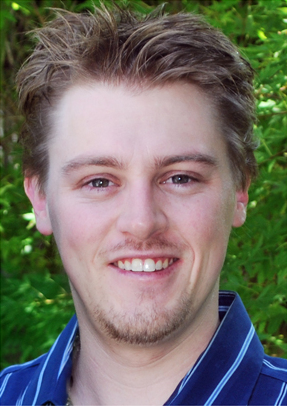
Ryan James, who worked on the games, joined the writers' room for the third season.

A writers' room for the third season was opened in late February 2025. Mazin, Druckmann, Gross, and Bo Shim were joined by Ryan James, who worked on the games, and Alexandra Cheng, Mazin's second-season writing assistant. Mazin had not started writing the season by April, planning to begin after the second season aired. Druckmann, Gross, and Shim stepped away from the writers' room by July, shortly before full work began, and Mazin had started writing by August, set to take several months. Ramsey had seen the scripts by January 2026. The season is set to feature more action sequences, continuing a trend from the second. Druckmann hoped it would be "as deeply faithful" to the games as the first season.

The series shifted to Abby's perspective in the second-season finale; the third season follows her story, as well as those of the characters around her, like Manny and Isaac. Mazin thought the change was risky but felt HBO executives "understand that this show is going to be a different show every season". The writers considered interlacing Ellie and Abby's stories throughout the seasons but Mazin wanted to maintain "the genetics of how this story functions". He thought they were "breaking quite a few rules" of television but felt "that is the point" of the series, reinforcing that the concept of protagonists and villains is inherently flawed; he considered it "a question of perspective and narrative" in which "you are denied your heroes and you're denied your villains". Druckmann said, like with the game, the third-season context of Abby's perspective is necessary before her confrontation with Ellie continues.

=== Filming ===
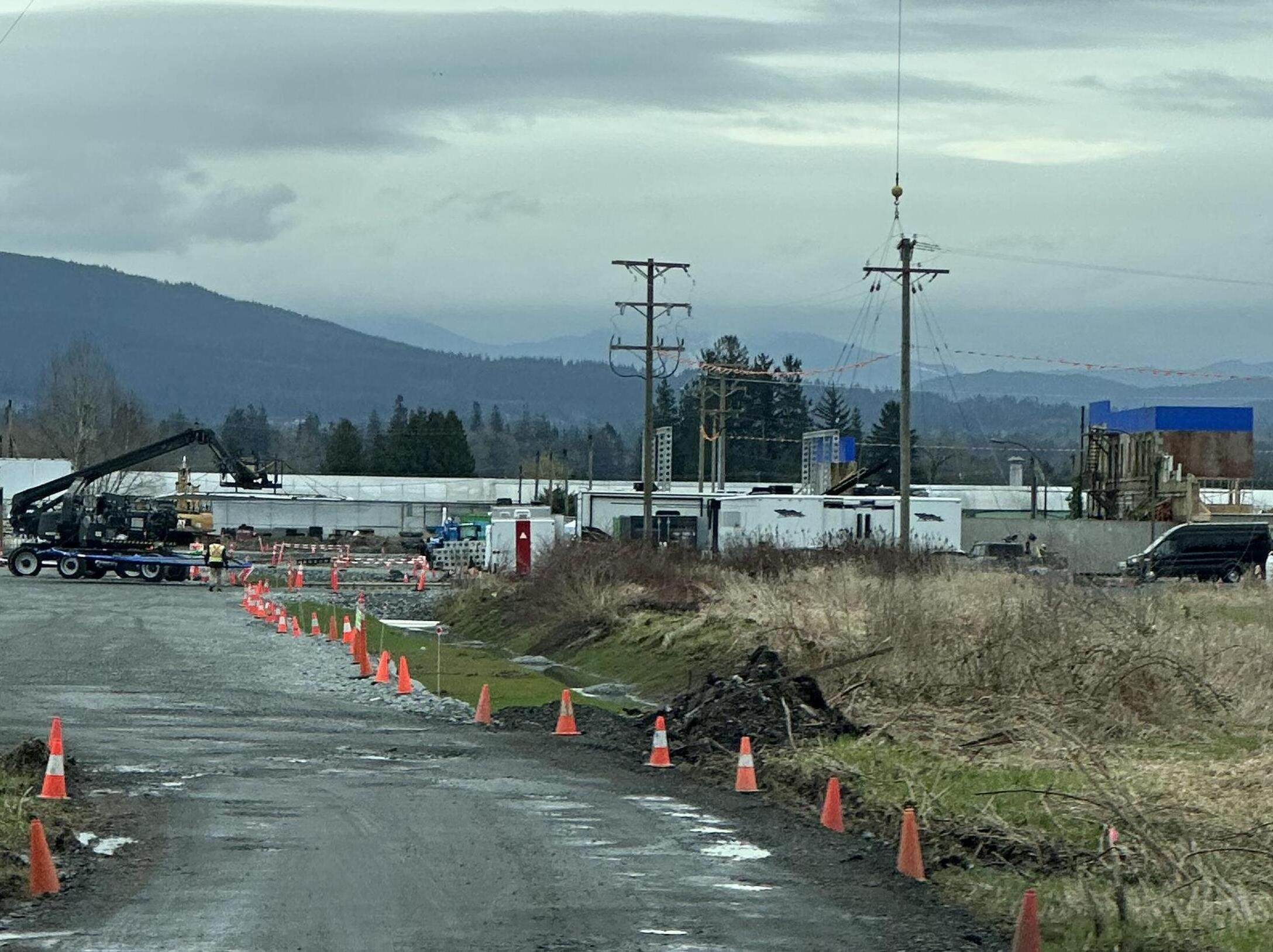
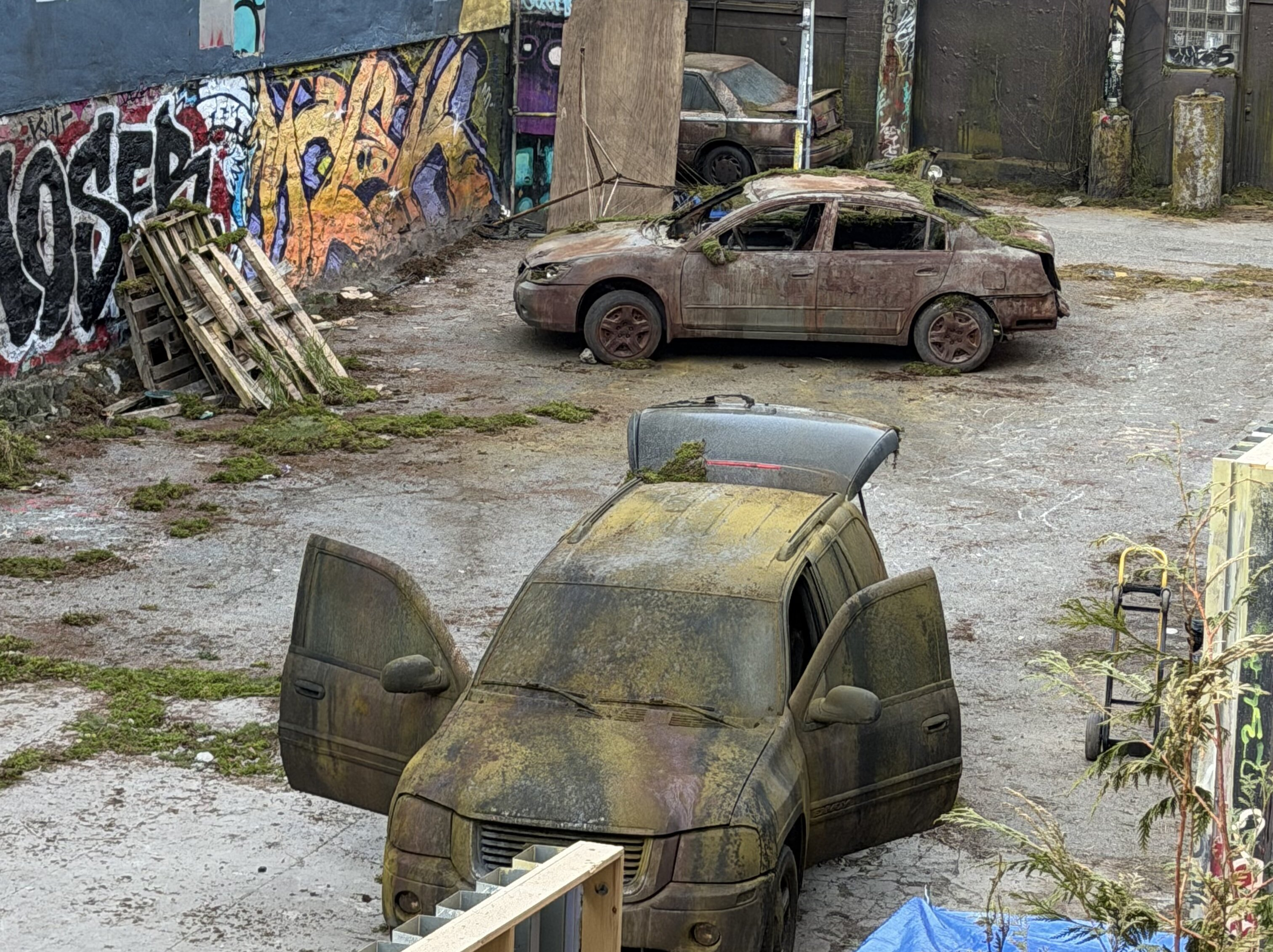
Filming took place in Maple Ridge (left) and Downtown Vancouver (right) from March 2026.

Ksenia Sereda returned as the lead director of photography, working with Mazin and Petrarca, while Ole Bratt Birkeland worked alongside Natali, Bernstein, and Kamata on the second, sixth, seventh, and eighth episodes. Principal photography for the third season, under the working title Calm Current, began in British Columbia on March 2, 2026. Dever traveled to Canada for pre-production in late January. Mazin and Natali directed from March, followed by Petrarca in May, Bernstein and Kamata in July, and Mazin again in August. Following council approval, a 14-hectare (35-acre) outdoor set was constructed near Maple Ridge and Pitt Meadows in March, with weathered structures, boats, and blue screens; some suspected it may be used for Haven, the Seraphites' island settlement.

Following preparation on March 22–30, filming took place in Gastown from March 30 to April 1, featuring Dever and Kratter on rooftops on March 30, some scenes in a laneway with simulated gunfire, and a scene involving a military convoy on April 1; nearby streets were closed for filming with the presence of the Vancouver Police Department, and cleanup took place on April 2. Filming of a WLF military convoy took place in New Westminster on April 8, followed by production inside the former Hudson's Bay department store from April 9–10 after a week of preparations, followed by cleanup from April 13–14. Production returned to Gastown overnight from April 24–25, prompting traffic closures, and took place near the Royal Centre around May 9–10, featuring extensive set dressing and several damaged vehicles. Production took a hiatus from June 1, initially for four weeks and later extended to seven, which some journalists attributed to Canada co-hosting the FIFA World Cup.

BC Place was decorated in late July as the WLF base, based on Seattle's Lumen Field, an extension of its depiction in the second-season finale, in which it was partly constructed on a soundstage but mostly created using visual effects. Luna and Mazino filmed scenes on August 23, and Luna returned intermittently to film additional scenes for several months. Production moved to Jackson Farm in Maple Ridge from August 24–25, where plans to remove eight or nine small fruit trees were scrapped after community complaints, and returned to Gastown on August 26, featuring Dever, WLF soldiers, and military vehicles. The Vancouver-based food truck Watt A Truck was invited to serve food to cast and crew during filming. Ramsey joined production around September. Filming took place at Whytecliff Beach from October 6–8, featuring a water vessel sourced from Seattle by Crosby Marine Film Services, including scenes of ten performers disembarking onto the beach. Initially scheduled to conclude on November 27, filming is set to take an eight-week hiatus from November 18 before a final five weeks of production from January 18 to February 22, 2027. Goodman is set to join production around January.

=== Design and post-production ===
Individuals returning to work on the third season include costume designer Ann Foley, production designer Don Macaulay, special effects supervisor Joel Whist, and editors Timothy A. Good and Emily Mendez.

== Release ==
According to Casey Bloys, the chairman and chief executive officer of HBO and HBO Max Content, the third season is expected to air in 2027.
