= Spencer Lord =

Canadian actor (born 1993)

- Born: March 1993 (age 33); British Columbia, Canada
- Occupation: Actor
- Years active: 2020–present

Spencer Lord (born March 1993) is a Canadian actor. He is known for his roles as Nathan Pryce Jr. in the CBC drama series Heartland (2023–present), Aiden Walsh on The CW drama series Family Law (2023–2024) and Owen in the HBO drama series The Last of Us (2025–present). He has appeared in television films and in an episode of the series The Good Doctor (2022).

== Early life ==
Lord was born in March 1993. He grew up in Kamloops, British Columbia, playing video games like Counter-Strike, StarCraft, and World of Warcraft. At the insistence of his friends, he auditioned for his school play Kiss Me, Kate in twelfth grade; he was cast in the lead role and fell in love with acting. He attended the University of British Columbia, earning a degree in mechanical engineering in 2016. After briefly working as an engineer, he considered quitting to pursue acting; he was shortly dismissed from his job, which prompted his decision, and he subsequently worked as a waiter while taking acting classes.

== Career ==
Lord made his television debut appearing in the fourth season of Riverdale as Terry. In 2021, Lord portrayed journalist Nate Eaton in Doomsday Mom: The Lori Vallow Story, his first role as a real person, for which he researched by watching hours of Eaton's reporting online. Eaton later interviewed Lord about his role for East Idaho News. Lord starred in the television films Honeymoon to Remember and Fishing for Love (both 2021) as Kyle and Zack, respectively.

Lord guest starred in The Good Doctor. He starred in the television rom-com film Mixed Baggage in 2022. He had a recurring role from 2023 to 2024 on Family Law as Aiden Walsh, a firefighter. Lord joined the cast of Heartland in the seventeenth season, playing Nathan Pryce Jr., one of the protagonist's love interests. In March 2024, Lord was cast as Owen in the second season of The Last of Us. He was promoted to a series regular for the third season in March 2026, and appeared in Leah McKendrick's film Voicemails for Isabelle in June.

== Filmography ==
Key
| † | Denotes films that have not yet been released |

| Year | Title | Role | Notes |
|---|---|---|---|
| 2020 | Riverdale | Terry | 2 episodes |
| 2021 | Doomsday Mom: The Lori Vallow Story | Nate Eaton | Television film |
| 2021 | A Honeymoon to Remember | Kyle | Television film |
| 2021 | Fishing for Love | Zack | Television film |
| 2022 | The Good Doctor | Ryan | Episode: "Cheat Day" |
| 2022 | Mixed Baggage | Jake Woodward | Television film |
| 2023–2024 | Family Law | Aiden Walsh | Recurring role; 8 episodes |
| 2023–present | Heartland | Nathan Pryce Jr. | Recurring role; 29 episodes |
| 2025–present | The Last of Us | Owen | Recurring role (season 2); Main role (season 3) |
| 2026 | Voicemails for Isabelle | Scott | Feature film |
