= The Last of Us Part II =

2020 video game

- Cover art depicting Ellie
- Developer: Naughty Dog (Note: Ported to Windows by Nixxes Software and Iron Galaxy)
- Publisher: Sony Interactive Entertainment
- Directors: Neil Druckmann; Anthony Newman; Kurt Margenau
- Designers: Emilia Schatz; Richard Cambier
- Programmers: Travis McIntosh; Christian Gyrling
- Artists: Erick Pangilinan; John Sweeney; Christian Nakata
- Writers: Neil Druckmann; Halley Gross
- Composer: Gustavo Santaolalla
- Series: The Last of Us
- Platforms: PlayStation 4; PlayStation 5; Windows
- Release: PlayStation 4; June 19, 2020; PlayStation 5; January 19, 2024; Windows; April 3, 2025
- Genre: Action-adventure
- Mode: Single-player

The Last of Us Part II is a 2020 action-adventure game developed by Naughty Dog and published by Sony Interactive Entertainment. Set four years after The Last of Us (2013), the game focuses on two playable characters in a post-apocalyptic United States whose lives intertwine: Ellie, who sets out in revenge for Joel's murder, and Abby, a soldier who killed Joel and becomes involved in a conflict between her militia and a religious cult. The game uses a third-person perspective; the player must fight human enemies and zombie-like creatures with firearms, improvised weapons, and stealth.

The game's development began in 2014, after the release of The Last of Us Remastered. Neil Druckmann returned as creative director, co-writing the story with Halley Gross. The themes of revenge and retribution were inspired by Druckmann's experiences growing up in Israel. Ashley Johnson reprises her role as Ellie, while Laura Bailey was cast as Abby. Their performances included the simultaneous recording of motion and voice. Gustavo Santaolalla returned to compose and perform the score. The developers pushed the PlayStation 4's technical capabilities. Development reportedly included a crunch schedule of 12-hour workdays and cost around US$220 million, making it one of the most expensive video games to develop.

Following delays, partly due to the COVID-19 pandemic, The Last of Us Part II was released for the PlayStation 4 in June 2020. A remastered version was released for the PlayStation 5 in January 2024 and for Windows in April 2025. The game received acclaim for its gameplay, audio design, score, performances, characters, and visual fidelity, though its narrative and themes divided critics. Discourse became adversarial and the game was review bombed on Metacritic, with some players criticizing the story and characters. It is one of the best-selling PlayStation 4 games and the fastest-selling PlayStation 4 exclusive, with over four million units sold in its release weekend and ten million by 2022. It won multiple accolades from awards shows and gaming publications, including 326 Game of the Year awards, and is considered one of the most significant eighth-generation console games and among the best video games.

== Gameplay ==
The Last of Us Part II is an action-adventure game played from a third-person perspective featuring elements of the survival horror genre. The player traverses post-apocalyptic environments such as buildings and forests to advance the story. The player can use firearms, improvised weapons, and stealth to defend against hostile humans and cannibalistic creatures infected by a mutated strain of the Cordyceps fungus. Control intermittently switches between Ellie and Abby; the player also briefly controls Joel in the opening sequence. The nimble nature of the player character introduces platforming elements, allowing the player to jump and climb to traverse environments and gain advantages during combat. The player can break glass objects such as windows to access certain areas or obtain supplies. Some areas are navigated by horse or boat.

In a change from its predecessor, The Last of Us Part II allows the player to crawl in a prone position to evade enemies.

In combat, the player can use long-range weapons such as rifles and bows, and short-range weapons such as pistols and revolvers. The player is able to scavenge limited-use melee weapons such as machetes and hammers, and throw bricks and bottles to distract or attack enemies. Collected items can be used to upgrade weapons at workbenches or craft equipment such as health kits, Molotov cocktails, and makeshift silencers. The player can collect supplements to upgrade skills in a skill tree; training manuals found throughout the environment unlock additional skill tree branches, allowing upgrades to attributes such as the health meter, crafting speed, and ammunition types.

Though the player can attack enemies directly, they can also use stealth to attack undetected or sneak past them. "Listen Mode" allows the player to locate enemies through a heightened sense of hearing and spatial awareness, indicated as outlines visible through walls and objects. In the cover system, the player can crouch behind obstacles to gain advantages in combat, and can also crawl in a prone position to evade enemies. Hostile enemies use artificial intelligence; they may take cover or call for assistance, and can take advantage when the player is distracted, out of ammunition, or in a fight. The player may be impaled by an arrow, which will progressively decrease their health meter and disables Listen Mode until removed when in cover. Player companions, such as Dina, assist in combat by killing enemies or announcing their location. The game introduces guard dogs that track the player's scent, which can be visualized in Listen Mode.

== Plot ==
Joel (Troy Baker) confesses to his brother, Tommy (Jeffrey Pierce), his responsibility in preventing the Fireflies' attempt to develop a cure for the Cordyceps fungus pandemic by saving Ellie (Ashley Johnson) from a non-survivable surgical procedure. Four years later, Joel and Ellie have built a life in Jackson, Wyoming, though their relationship has become strained. While on patrol, Joel and Tommy rescue a stranger, Abby (Laura Bailey), from an Infected horde. They return to an outpost used as a temporary hideout by Abby's group, former Fireflies now part of the Washington Liberation Front (WLF), a militia group based in Seattle, Washington. The group attacks Joel and Tommy; Abby seeks revenge against Joel for murdering her father (Derek Phillips), the Firefly surgeon who was to operate on Ellie. Meanwhile, Ellie and her girlfriend, Dina (Shannon Woodward), search for the brothers. Ellie enters the WLF outpost and witnesses Abby beat Joel to death. Abby spares Ellie and Tommy, who swear revenge.

Tommy sets out for Seattle to hunt Abby, and Ellie and Dina follow him. In Seattle, Ellie reveals her immunity; Dina, in turn, reveals that she is pregnant. The next day, Ellie pursues Tommy alone and encounters Jesse (Stephen Chang), Dina's ex-boyfriend, who had followed them. While searching for Abby's friend Nora (Chelsea Tavares), Ellie encounters the Seraphites, a religious cult locked in a battle with the WLF over control of Seattle. Ellie tracks down Nora and tortures her for information on Abby's location, an act that traumatizes Ellie. The following day, she kills two more members of Abby's group, the pregnant Mel (Ashly Burch) and her boyfriend, Owen (Patrick Fugit). A flashback reveals that, two years earlier, Ellie traveled to the Firefly hospital in Salt Lake City and learned the truth. Devastated, she cut ties with Joel. In the present, Ellie's group is ambushed by Abby, who kills Jesse and holds Tommy hostage.

Three days earlier, Abby learns from WLF leader Isaac (Jeffrey Wright) that Owen, her ex-boyfriend, has gone missing while investigating Seraphite activity. Abby searches for Owen and is captured by Seraphites. She is rescued by Yara (Victoria Grace) and Lev (Ian Alexander), Seraphite siblings who have been branded apostates after Lev defied Seraphite traditions. Abby leaves to find Owen, who, disillusioned with the war, plans to sail to Santa Barbara, California, where Fireflies may be regrouping. After spending the night with Owen, Abby wakes from a nightmare in which Yara and Lev are killed. She returns to rescue them and travels across Seattle with Lev to retrieve medical supplies so Mel can amputate Yara's crippled arm. After the surgery, Lev runs away to the Seraphite home island to convince his devout mother to abandon the cult. Abby and Yara find him in the Seraphite settlement, where Lev has killed his mother in self-defense. The trio flees as the WLF mounts an invasion of the island. Abby betrays the WLF to save Lev, and Yara kills Isaac, sacrificing herself to allow Abby and Lev to escape. The pair return to find Owen and Mel dead, along with a map leading to Ellie's hideout. After killing Jesse, an enraged Abby shoots Tommy in the head and severely beats Ellie and Dina. At Lev's insistence, Abby spares them and demands they leave Seattle.

Several months later, Ellie and Dina are living on a farm, raising Dina and Jesse's son, though Ellie suffers from post-traumatic stress. Having survived his injuries, Tommy arrives with information on Abby's whereabouts. Though initially hesitant, Ellie leaves to find her, despite Dina's pleas to stay. Abby and Lev arrive in Santa Barbara searching for the Fireflies, who they discover are regrouping at Catalina Island, California, but are captured, tortured, and left to die by the slave-keeping Rattlers. Ellie arrives at Santa Barbara and rescues the pair. Ellie forces Abby to fight her, during which Abby bites off two of Ellie's fingers. Ellie overpowers and nearly drowns Abby but has a change of heart after having a flashback of Joel and ultimately spares her. Abby and Lev sail to the Fireflies. Ellie returns to the abandoned farmhouse. She tries to play Joel's guitar with her damaged hand, recalls her last conversation with Joel in which she expressed her willingness to forgive him, and leaves.

== Development ==
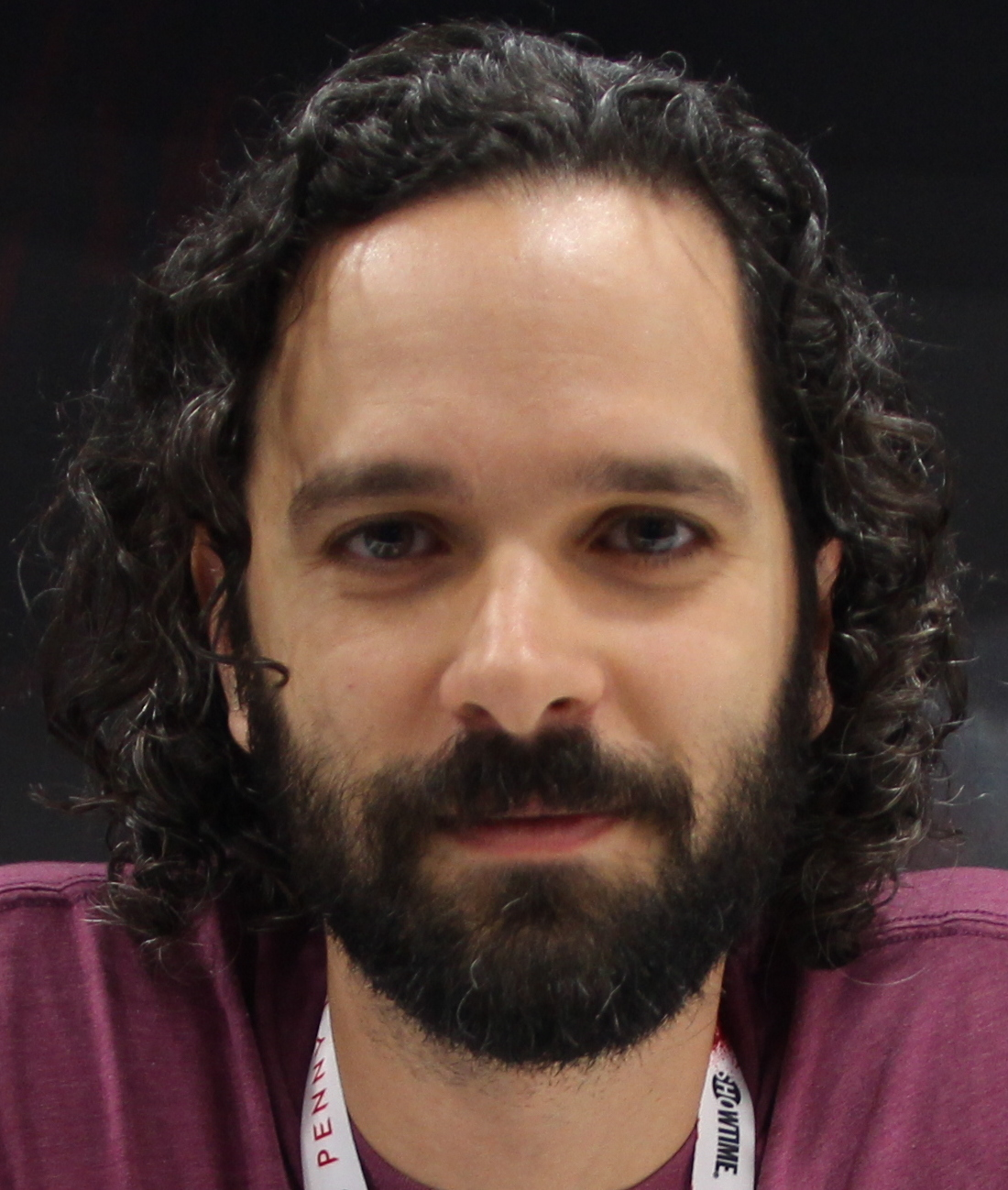
Neil Druckmann

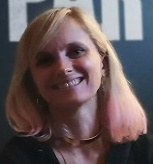
Halley Gross

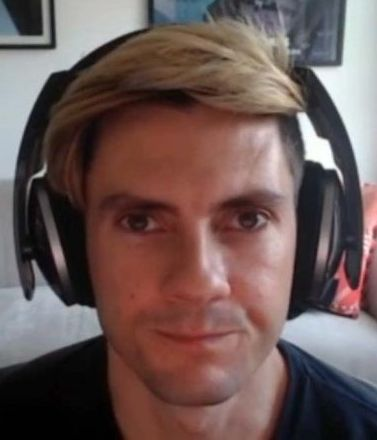
Anthony Newman

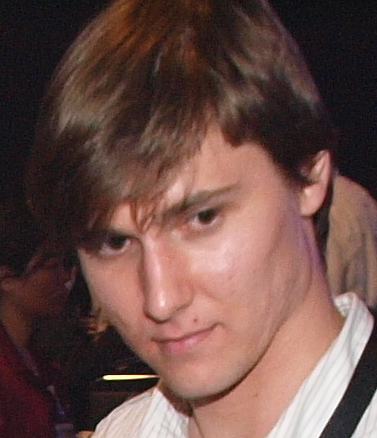
Kurt Margenau

Druckmann returned as creative director for The Last of Us Part II, co-writing the story with Gross, while Newman and Margenau were co-game directors.

Early story concepts for The Last of Us Part II were conceived during the development of The Last of Us in 2013. Naughty Dog began development in 2014, soon after the release of The Last of Us Remastered. By August 2017, with the release of Uncharted: The Lost Legacy, the entire 350-person team at Naughty Dog had shifted to develop Part II. Neil Druckmann led development as creative director and writer, reprising his role from The Last of Us and Uncharted 4: A Thief's End (2016). Anthony Newman and Kurt Margenau were selected to be co-game directors for Part II, overseeing gameplay elements such as level design and mechanics. For the final months of development, due to the COVID-19 pandemic, the team operated via remote work arrangements. In total, approximately 2,169 developers across 14 studios worked on the game. According to documents from publisher Sony Interactive Entertainment, the 70-month development peaked at 200 full-time employees and cost around US$220 million, making it one of the most expensive video games to develop.

Druckmann wrote the story with Halley Gross. The team experimented with different plot structures and considered scrapping the project until they settled on an idea that mirrored the first game; Druckmann said that whereas The Last of Us is about the extreme measures one would take for love, Part II is more about how far one would go to bring justice for those they love. The themes of revenge and retribution were inspired by Druckmann's experiences growing up in Israel, where violence was a frequent topic. He recalled watching footage of the 2000 Ramallah lynching, and how, after hearing the cheering crowds, his mind turned to violent thoughts about bringing the perpetrators to justice. He wanted the player to feel a "thirst for revenge" before making them realize the reality of their actions. Druckmann said other themes include tribalism, trauma, and the pursuit of justice. Artists at Naughty Dog traveled to Seattle to analyze the architecture, vegetation, materials, topography, lighting, and capture photorealistic textures.

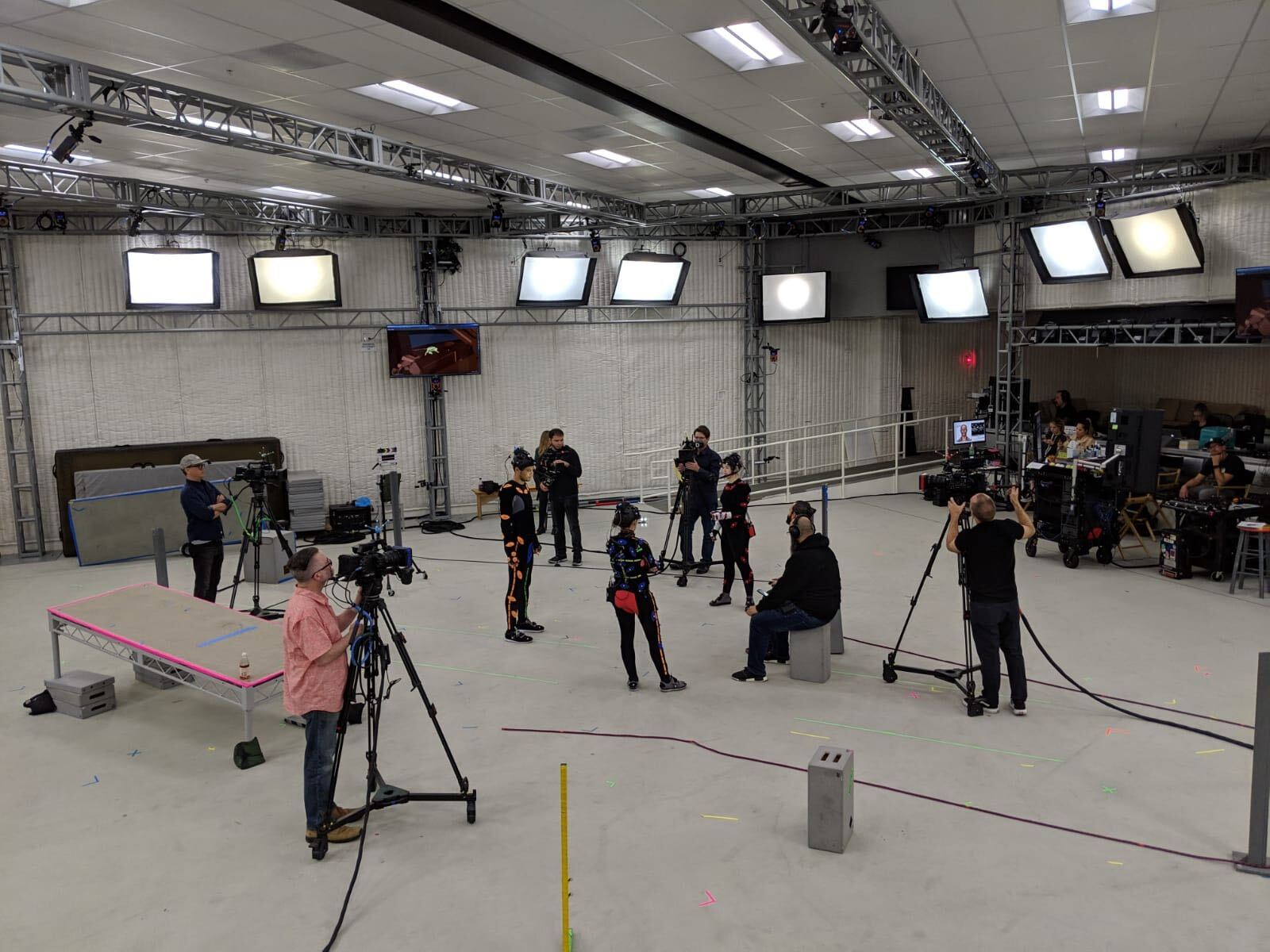
Motion capture recording for The Last of Us Part II in Playa Vista, Los Angeles

Ashley Johnson and Troy Baker reprise their roles as Ellie and Joel, respectively, while Laura Bailey was cast as Abby. The actors' performances were recorded at a studio in Playa Vista, Los Angeles using performance capture, recording motion and voice simultaneously. Gross noted that a goal of the writers was to "create the most multifaceted characters you've seen in games". She particularly wanted to explore the multifaceted behavior of Ellie, showing her power as well as her insecurities. The change of player character from Ellie to Abby was inspired by the change from Joel to Ellie in the first game, though emphasized in Part II due to its focus on empathy. Druckmann wanted the player to hate Abby early in the game, but later empathize with her.

The developers pushed the technical capabilities of the PlayStation 4 when creating Part II, adding more enemies and larger environments than in previous games. Druckmann noted that any drops in detail would ruin the sense of authenticity, which required consistent optimization of the technology. Improved artificial intelligence (AI) allowed for deeper connections with characters and the creation of bonds through gameplay. The Last of Us Part II was originally planned as an open world game with hub worlds, but later the game transferred to a more linear style as it better served the narrative. Naughty Dog wanted to increase the accessibility options introduced in Uncharted 4 to ensure that all players could complete the story, and the developers attended conferences and worked with advocates.

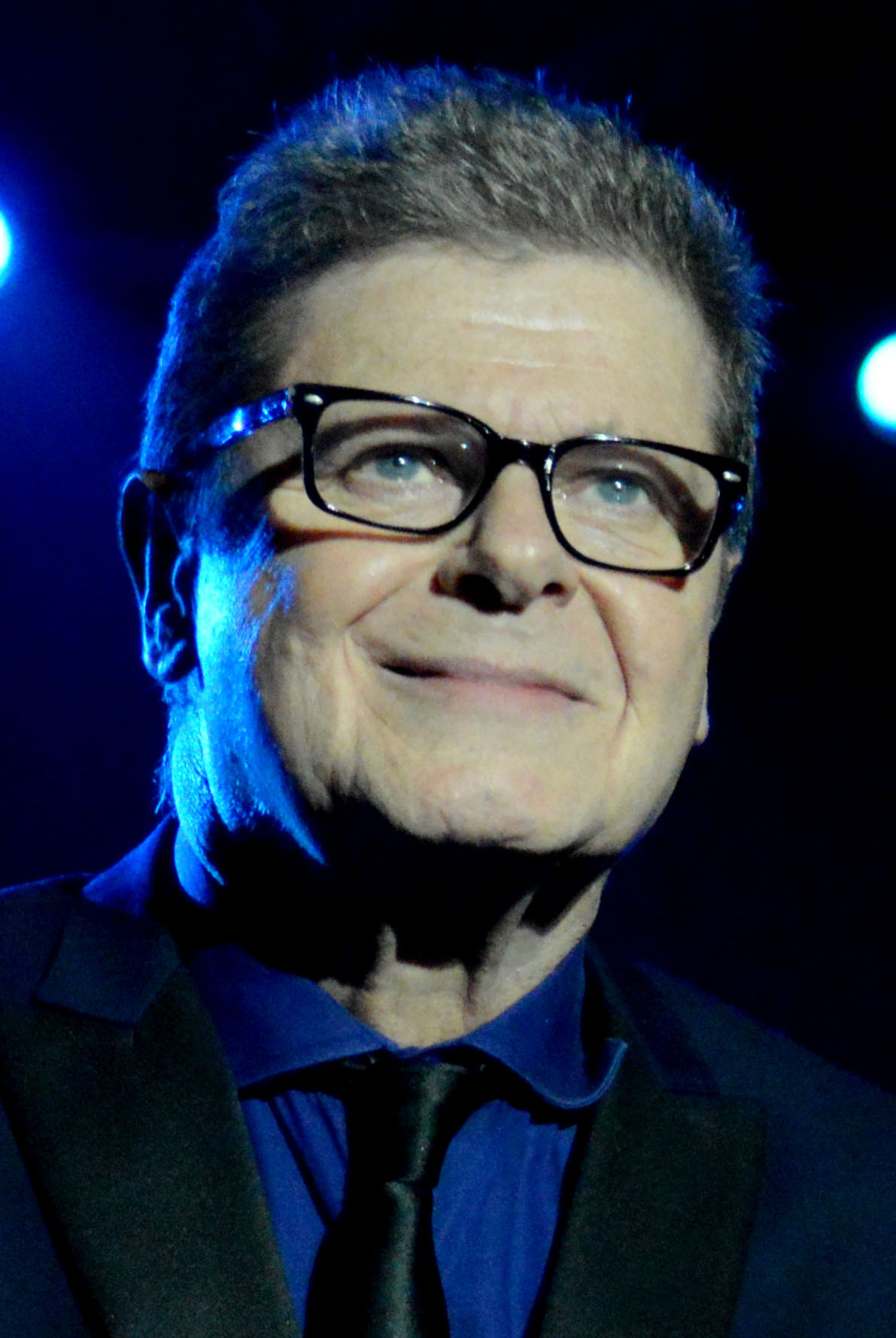
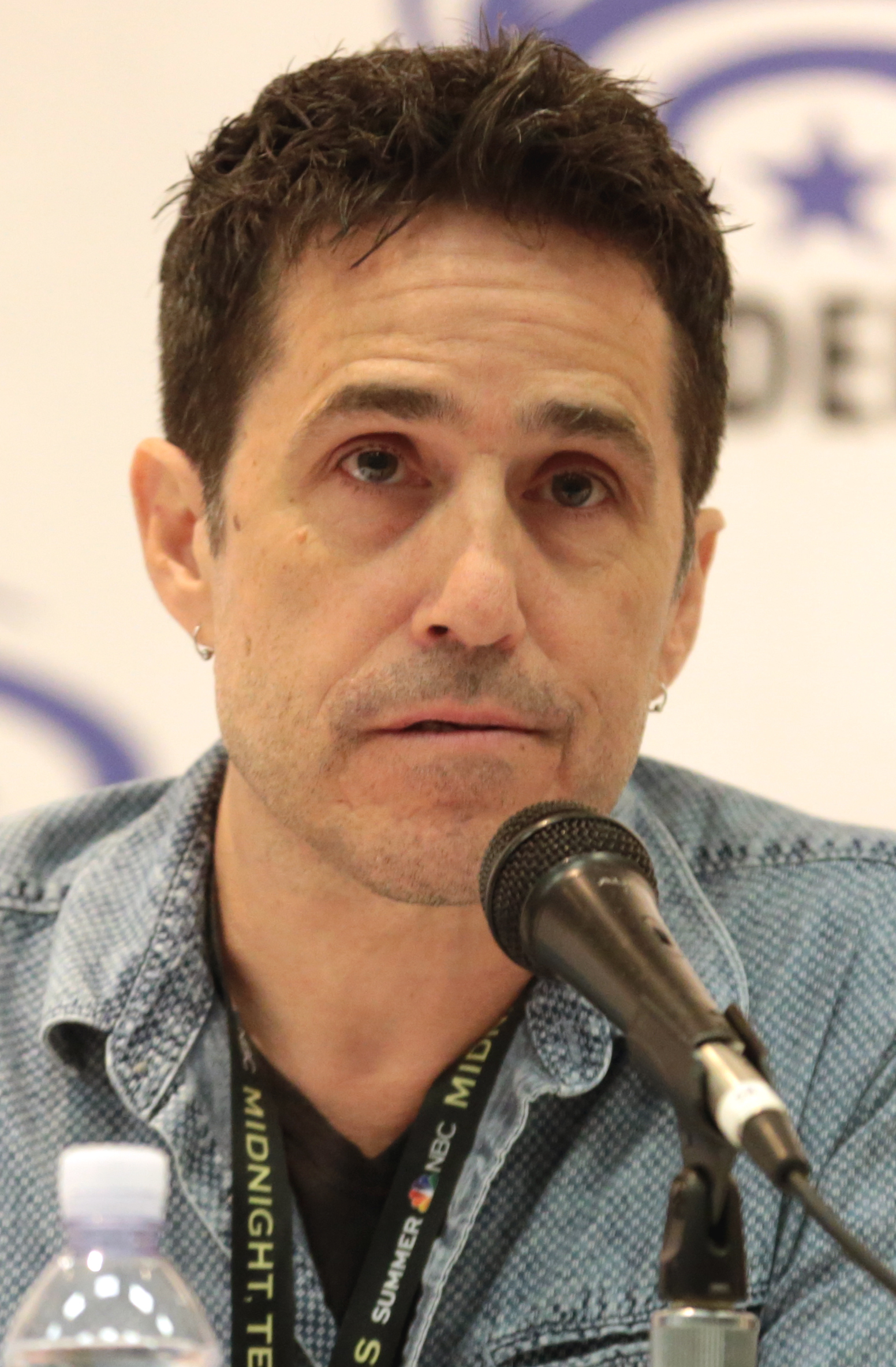
Gustavo Santaolalla (left) returned to compose the score for The Last of Us Part II, while Mac Quayle (right) provided additional combat music.

Gustavo Santaolalla returned to compose and perform the game's score, as he had done with the first game, while Mac Quayle contributed combat music. The developers received permission to use the songs "Future Days" by Pearl Jam and "Take On Me" by A-ha. To achieve the sound of the Shamblers, the team hired voice actors Raul Ceballos and Steve Blum, and used items such as grapefruits to create the explosion sounds. The dialogue team referenced whistled languages such as Sfryria and Silbo Gomero for the Seraphites' whistling, and hired actors Stevie Mack and Lisa Marie to provide the whistles in three styles.

According to a report by Kotaku's Jason Schreier, the development included a crunch schedule of 12-hour work days. This continued after the game was delayed. Schreier suggested that development was slowed due to the enormous turnover of employees following the development of Uncharted 4, with few veterans left on the team. Some of the developers allegedly hoped that Part II would fail and prove that the working conditions were not viable. Sony granted Naughty Dog an additional two weeks of development for bug fixes. Druckmann felt that he had failed to find the correct balance for employees on Part II, and said the studio would receive external assistance for future projects.

== Release and promotion ==
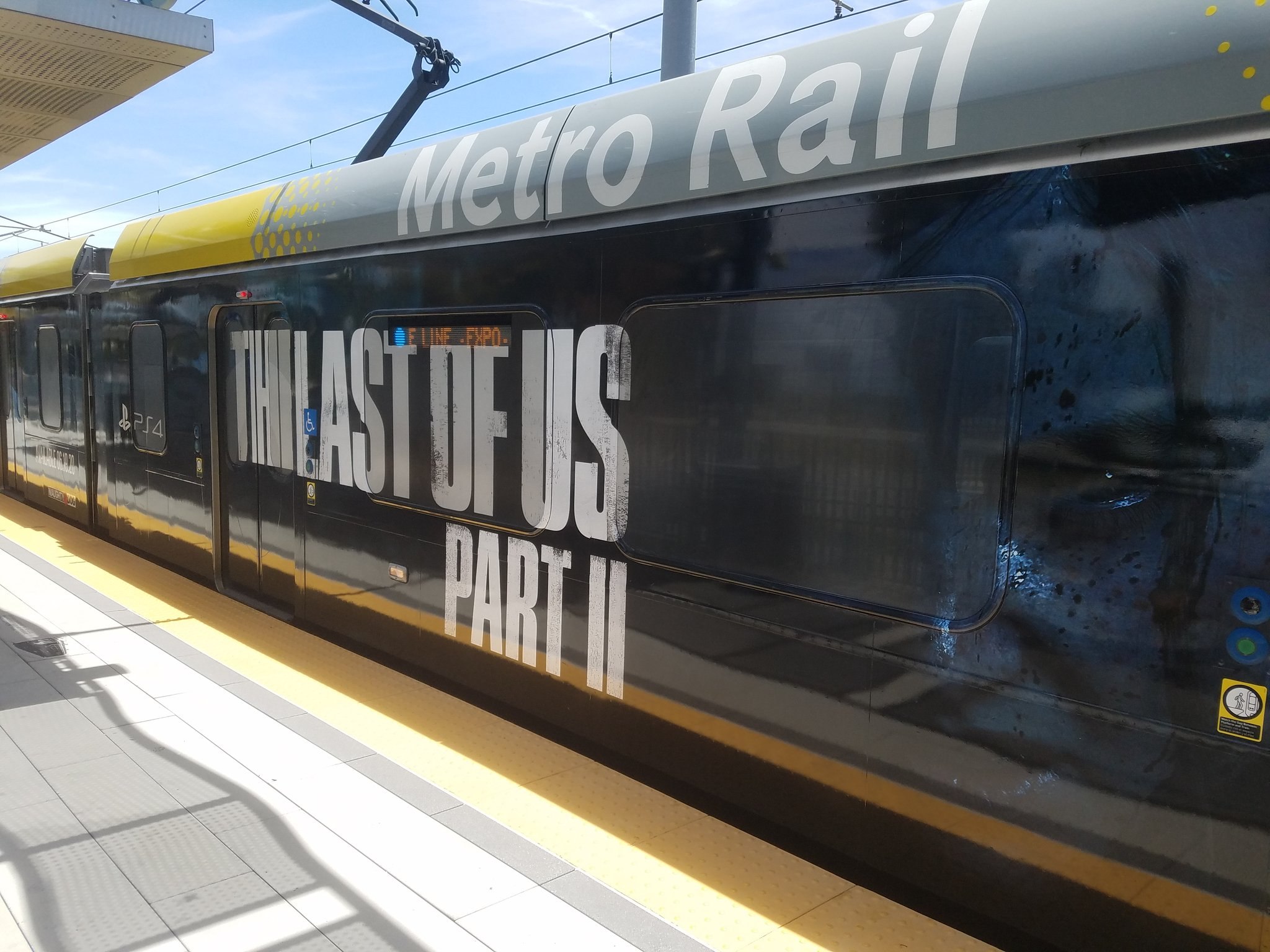
Marketing on a train in Santa Monica, California

The Last of Us Part II was announced at the PlayStation Experience event on December 3, 2016. At E3 2018, Druckmann said that Naughty Dog was refusing to announce a release date until the game was "very close to release", to avoid disappointing fans. During Sony's State of Play presentation on September 24, 2019, Naughty Dog announced a release date of February 21, 2020. On October 25, Druckmann announced a delay to May 29, 2020, to "bring the entire game up to a level of polish we would call Naughty Dog quality". On April 2, 2020, Sony announced that the game was almost complete but had been indefinitely delayed due to logistical problems caused by the COVID-19 pandemic. In late April, several videos leaked online, showing cutscenes, gameplay, and significant plot details. Druckmann tweeted that he was "heartbroken" for fans and for the team, who had devoted years to development. On April 27, Sony announced a release date of June 19, 2020.

The first trailer was released alongside the announcement, showcasing the return of Ellie and Joel. The second trailer, released in October 2017 as a part of Paris Games Week, revealed Abby, Yara, and Lev. Dina and Jesse were first shown in a presentation at E3 2018. A trailer was featured in Sony's State of Play presentation in September 2019, which preceded additional marketing to celebrate Outbreak Week—the week in which the fictional outbreak occurred in the original game. A story trailer was released on May 6, followed by an animated commercial on June 3, and the final pre-launch trailer on June 10. Naughty Dog replaced and altered characters in the trailers to conceal story events; Druckmann cited the marketing of Metal Gear Solid 2: Sons of Liberty (2001), which concealed its protagonist in trailers, as an influence.

Naughty Dog announced the special edition versions in September 2019. The game was featured in its own standalone State of Play presentation on May 27. From May 13 to June 3, Naughty Dog released a series of videos about the development. The game was banned in Saudi Arabia and the United Arab Emirates, attributed to its depiction of LGBTQ characters not aligning with the countries' discriminatory practices against homosexuality. An update on August 13 added a permadeath mode, a new difficulty level, and gameplay modifiers. For The Last of Us Day (Note: Formerly known as Outbreak Day, but changed in 2020 due to the impact of the COVID-19 pandemic) in September 2020, Naughty Dog announced new merchandise for the game, including a vinyl soundtrack, board game, statues, and posters. A performance update was released on May 19, 2021, allowing gameplay at 60 frames per second on the PlayStation 5. A 120-minute documentary about the game's development, Grounded II: Making The Last of Us Part II, was released on February 2, 2024.

=== Remaster ===
In November 2023, following a PlayStation Store listing leak, Naughty Dog announced a remastered version of the game, titled The Last of Us Part II Remastered. It was released for the PlayStation 5 on January 19, 2024; existing owners can purchase the game digitally for US$10. A special edition version, including a SteelBook case, trading cards, patch, and pins, was made available in some regions. Remastered features visual improvements, faster loading times, DualSense integration, audio description, a speedrun-focused mode, and an audio commentary for cutscenes featuring Druckmann, Gross, Johnson, Baker, Bailey, and Woodward. Some journalists and players questioned whether the game needed a remaster within four years of its initial release, though others felt it was justified by the additions and price point.

New gameplay modes include Guitar Free Play, featuring playable characters Ellie, Joel, and Gustavo (modeled after Santaolalla) in several locations with unlockable guitars like Gustavo's banjo; Lost Levels, featuring three scrapped and incomplete gameplay sequences with an introduction by Druckmann and commentary by designers Pete Ellis and Banun Idris; and No Return, a roguelike survival mode featuring randomized combat encounters. No Return features twelve playable characters (Note: No Return's initial ten playable characters are Ellie, Dina, Jesse, Joel, Tommy, Abby, Lev, Yara, Mel, and Manny.) with unique traits and tracked challenges, which can be completed to unlock skins and gameplay modifications. Each run in No Return features five encounters and a boss fight. Encounters consist of four gameplay types, including fighting waves of enemies, capturing a guarded safe, and defending a friend. Upgrades, items, and weapons collected during runs are lost upon completion or failure. Remastered was updated in October 2024 to target higher resolutions and frame rates on the PlayStation 5 Pro.

At the Game Awards in December 2024, Naughty Dog announced the game's Windows version, developed in collaboration with Nixxes Software and Iron Galaxy; new content (Note: The new content for Remastered includes two characters (Bill and Marlene) and four maps for No Return, and a new skin for Ellie featuring Jordan A. Mun's jacket from Intergalactic: The Heretic Prophet.) was added to the PlayStation 5 version in tandem with the Windows release on April 3, 2025. The Last of Us Complete—a bundle featuring The Last of Us Part I and Part II Remastered—was released digitally on April 10, 2025, followed by a physical collector's edition on July 10, featuring a SteelBook case, art prints, and a new print of the comic series The Last of Us: American Dreams. A July 2025 update added a chronological mode, intertwining Ellie and Abby's stories, as well as skins for Joel and Tommy based on Uncharted 4's Nathan and Sam Drake, respectively.

== Reception ==
=== Critical response ===
Reception

Aggregate scores
Aggregator	Score
Metacritic	93/100
OpenCritic	94% recommend

Review scores
Publication	Score
Destructoid	8.5/10
Game Informer	10/10
GameRevolution	3.5/5
GameSpot	8/10
GamesRadar+	5/5
IGN	10/10
Push Square	10/10
USgamer	4.5/5
VentureBeat	95/100
VG247	5/5

The Last of Us Part II received "universal acclaim" from critics, according to the review aggregator website Metacritic. OpenCritic's consensus called it "another masterpiece from Naughty Dog" and "a brutal, poignant, beautiful, and thrilling experience", with 94% of critics recommending the game. IGN's Jonathon Dornbush called it "a masterpiece worthy of its predecessor", noting, atop its improved gameplay, it "still makes time for a stunning, nuanced exploration of the strength and fragility of the human spirit". Game Informer's Andy McNamara called it "the best narrative game I have played" and "a sequel unlike any other, taking video game storytelling to new heights". Kaity Kline of NPR wrote that it "made me very aware of the little things in my life that I take for granted, the kinds of things you don't appreciate until they're ripped away forever". GameSpot's Kallie Plagge called it "beautiful and devastating", and wrote "the more I reflect on it, the more I appreciate the story and characters at its core".

Game Informer's McNamara felt that the writers conveyed the themes of emotions "with careful nuance and unflinching emotion". Destructoid's Chris Carter and VG247's Kirk McKeand applauded the use of minor dialogue to echo the themes. Sammy Barker of Push Square particularly praised the use of flashback and overlapping stories; The Guardian's Keza MacDonald concurred, describing the narrative as "emotionally effective". Conversely, GameRevolution's Michael Leri thought that the flashbacks were evidence of pacing problems. Alex Avard of GamesRadar+ felt that the narrative lost its momentum during its need to finalize every story thread. USgamer's Kat Bailey found the latter half slow, and that the game was five hours "too long". Bailey also criticized the dissonance between the statement against violence and its necessity during gameplay. Polygon's Maddy Myers and Kotaku's Riley MacLeod wrote that the game repeatedly delivered its themes without allowing the player any agency in their decisions. Rob Zacny of Vice wrote that, despite the amount of narrative moments, "it doesn't have much to say". Also writing for Vice, Emanuel Maiberg drew parallels between the Israeli–Palestinian conflict and the WLF and Seraphites, and argued this was poorly considered for its allegorical representation of two equal sides.

McKeand of VG247 described every character as "complex and human". Destructoid's Carter felt empathetic to the main characters, a sentiment echoed by IGN's Dornbush, who found Ellie's development particularly "riveting". Andrew Webster of The Verge praised the relationship between Ellie and Dina, though noted some dissonance in Ellie's behavior between gameplay and cutscenes. GameSpot's Plagge wrote that Abby's characterization led to a deeper connection to her than to Ellie, but found her character development incongruous with her "onslaught of combat against human enemies". Kotaku's MacLeod and VentureBeat's Dean Takahashi appreciated the diversity of characters; Oli Welsh of Eurogamer praised the representation of female and LGBT characters, calling it "a game about women", and The Spinoff's Sam Brooks called it "a masterclass in how gaming can do inclusivity". NPR's Kline lauded the game's ability to "connect with every character, not just the main characters". Push Square's Barker wrote that the supporting characters "establish themselves extremely swiftly", and Game Informer's McNamara found their occasional absence alarming, having grown close to them. Conversely, some critics felt that the new supporting characters lacked the higher quality of the main characters and of Naughty Dog's previous work; Yannick Le Fur of Jeuxvideo.com wrote that characters such as Jesse and Manny were simply used to advance the narrative. Polygon's Myers and Vice's Zacny criticized the characters' inability to learn from their mistakes.

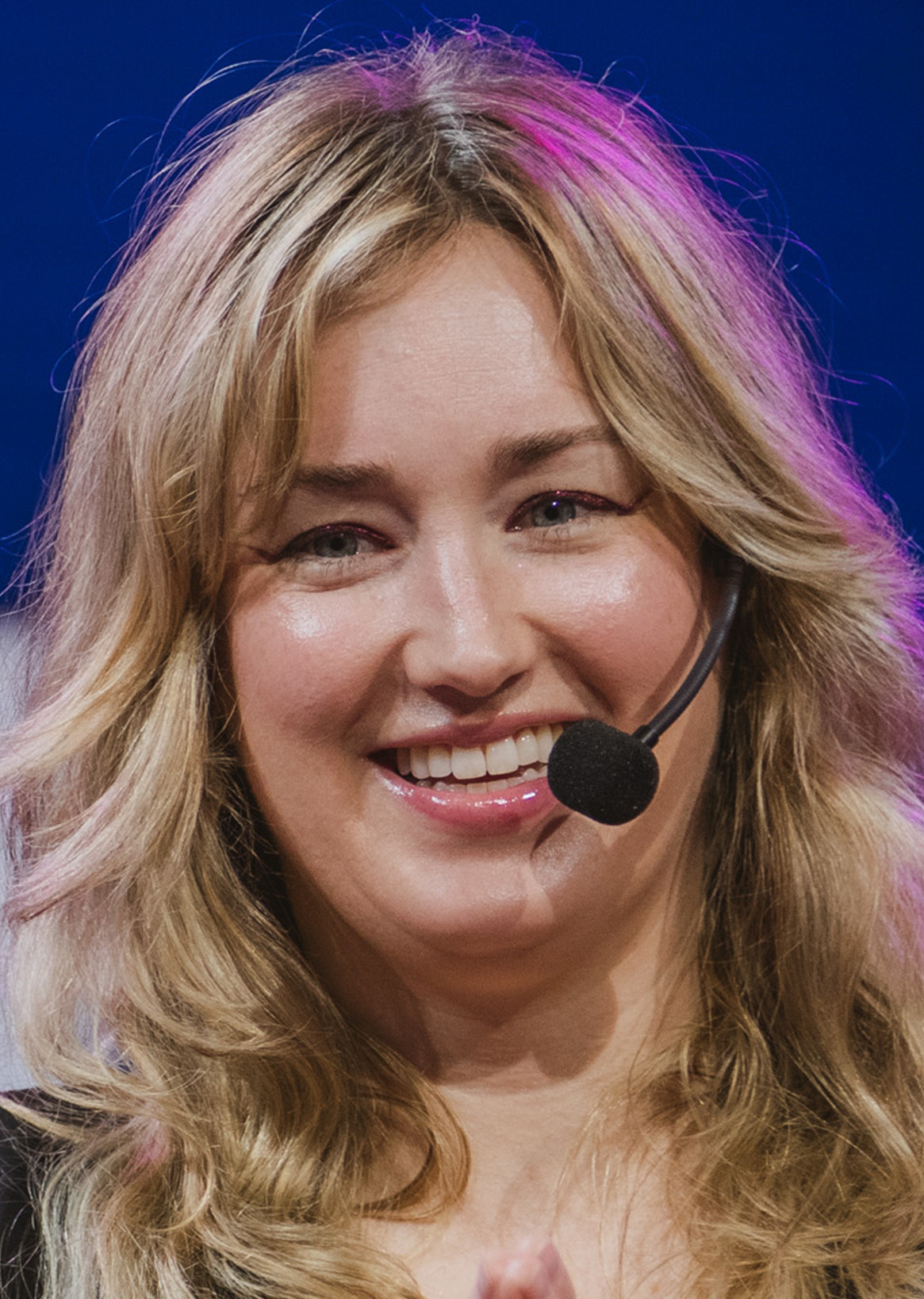
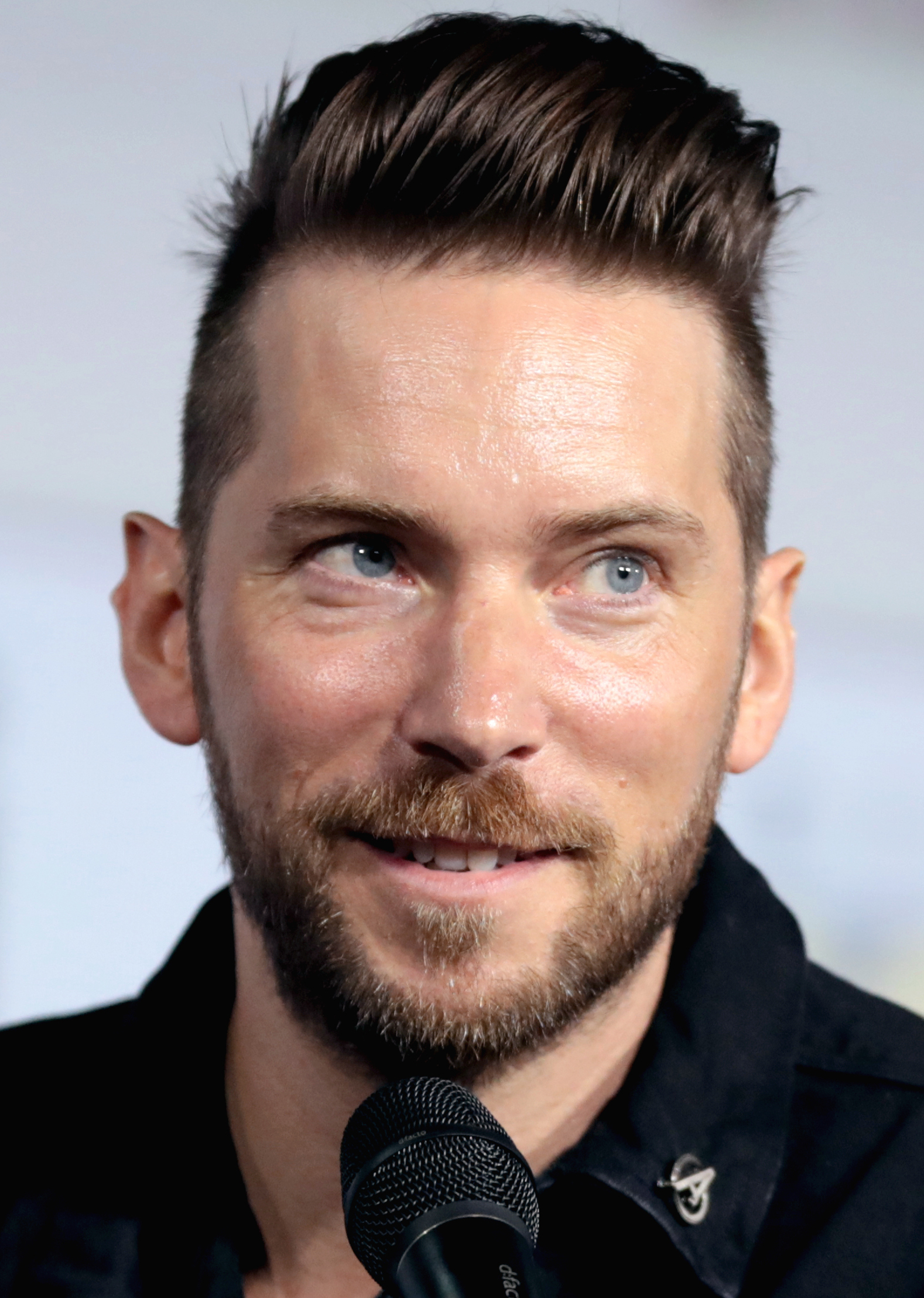
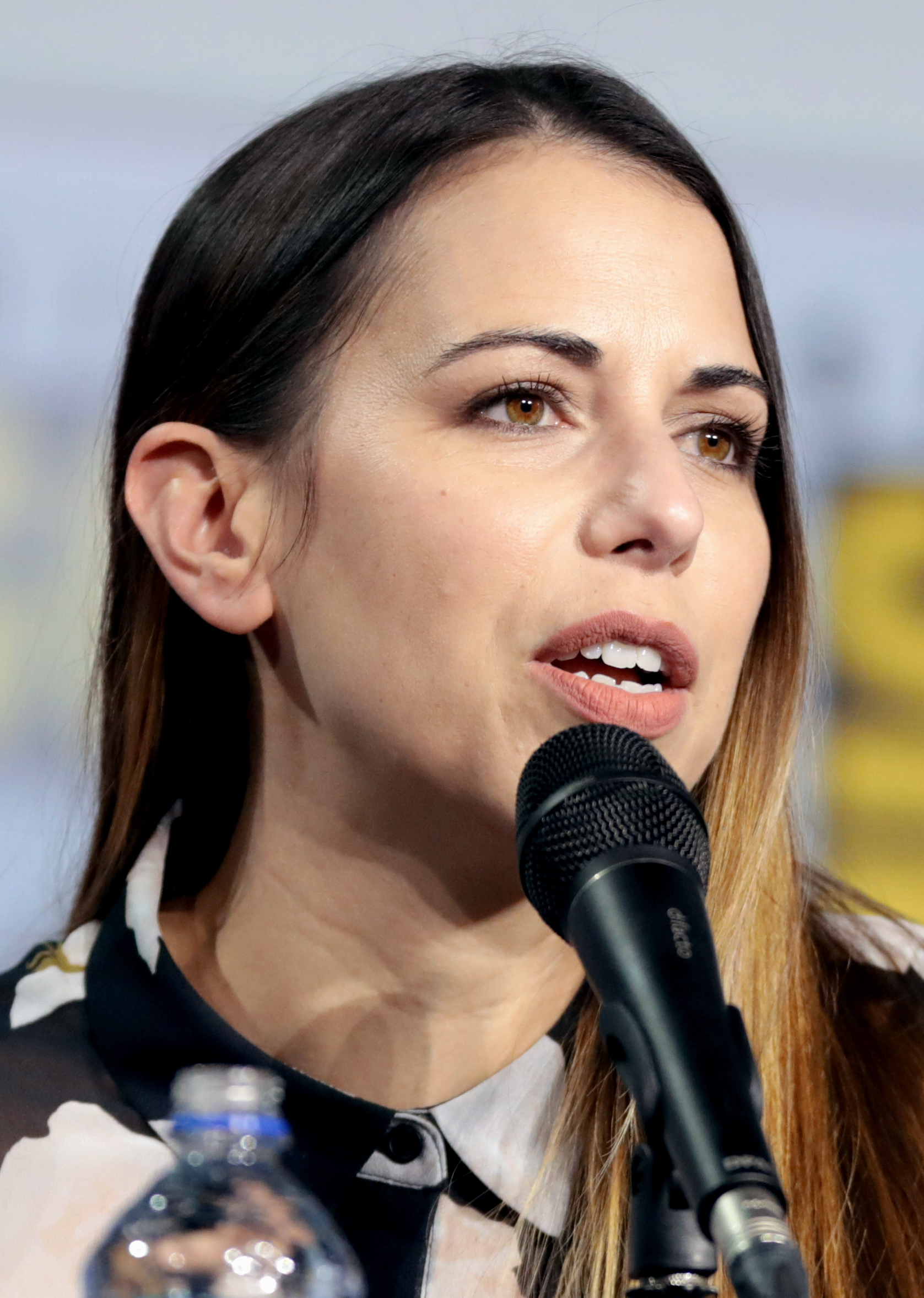
The performances of (L to R) Ashley Johnson, Troy Baker, and Laura Bailey were widely praised by critics.

Critics praised the cast's performances, particularly those of Ashley Johnson, Troy Baker, and Laura Bailey. Welsh of Eurogamer found Johnson's performance as Ellie to be "standout" due to her depiction of "rawness, vulnerability, and rage". GamesRadar+'s Avard considered Johnson's portrayal of suffering "nothing short of awards worthy", and found that Baker "steals some of Part 2's best scenes as Joel" by adding complexities that enrich the character and relationships. Dornbush of IGN wrote that Johnson added nuance to every element of Ellie, and commended Woodward's performance as Dina, especially during quieter moments. VG247's McKeand found that the performances made the narrative more powerful.

GamesRadar+'s Avard praised the care and authenticity with which gameplay mechanics were introduced, on par with Naughty Dog's reputation. GameRevolution's Leri lauded the cohesiveness of gameplay and narrative, and their ability to create empathy. GameSpot's Plagge appreciated the combat's intensity and the fluidity of Ellie's movements, and VentureBeat's Takahashi found the combat more diverse than the first game's. IGN's Dornbush felt combat gameplay and puzzles had been improved, praising the enemies' intelligence and variation. GamesRadar+'s Avard described the enemy AI as "some of the most advanced" of any game. VG247's McKeand considered the level design better than other Naughty Dog games, and Game Informer's McNamara felt it improved combat scenarios. The Verge's Webster admired the action but noted some "awkward moments when [it] attempts to cover its video game-ness". Polygon's Myers found the combat an unsubtle messenger for the game's statement on violence; Kotaku's MacLeod thought its pacing "sometimes felt like punishment". Critics praised the game's "unprecedented" accessibility options; Polygon's Stephen Wilds called them "an amazing gift", even for players who do not require them, and The Spinoff's Brooks felt they set a new bar for the medium.

Many critics felt the graphics were among the best of any PlayStation 4 game. Kotaku's MacLeod wrote that the nature in Seattle is "gorgeous and awe-inspiring", and Push Square's Barker declared the art department "among the best in the industry". The Guardian's MacDonald described the graphics as "meticulous and astounding". Dornbush of IGN appreciated the world's ability to tell additional stories. GameRevolution's Leri considered the environments more realistic than the first game's, and praised the technical elements, such as frame rate, lack of load times, and realistic lighting. Carter of Destructoid felt that the seamless animation of minor facial expressions humanized the characters to a new level. McNamara of Game Informer similarly lauded the realistic-looking characters. VentureBeat's Takahashi commended the improvements to Naughty Dog's already impressive engine. Zacny of Vice found Seattle too similar to Boston and Pittsburgh from the first game, and Christopher Byrd of The Washington Post wondered if the detail was worth the "human cost" of Naughty Dog's crunch culture.

Barker of Push Square described the sound design as "stunning", identifying the 3D audio as a technical feat he would not have expected until PlayStation 5. Vice's Zacny found that the audio design made settings feel more lifelike in a way that the visuals occasionally failed to do. IGN's Dornbush similarly felt that the sounds added realism, and praised Santaolalla's "moving" score. McNamara of Game Informer found that the music added tension. Kevin Dunsmore of Hardcore Gamer wrote that the "haunting and subtle melodies blend into the world seamlessly". Eurogamer's Welsh praised the score for its combination of banjo and electronics.

==== Remastered ====
Remastered reception

Aggregate scores
Aggregator	Score
Metacritic	90/100
OpenCritic	90% recommend

Review scores
Publication	Score
Hardcore Gamer	5/5
NME	4/5
PC Gamer (US)	60/100
PC Games (DE)	10/10
PCMag	5/5
Push Square	9/10
Video Games Chronicle	5/5

The Last of Us Part II Remastered received "universal acclaim" according to Metacritic, and 90% of critics recommended the game according to OpenCritic. Video Games Chronicle's Jordan Middler called it "the best way to play one of the best games ever made", and Siliconera's Cory Dinkel wrote "it elevates an already near-perfect experience". Push Square's Aaron Bayne found it perfectly partnered the first game's remake, Part I. Digital Trends's Giovanni Colantonio compared it to a Criterion Collection re-release and The Guardian's Keith Stuart compared replaying the game to "rereading a favourite novel". Critics gave the Windows version "generally favorable" reviews, praising the optimization though noting occasional performance issues.

Destructoid's Smangaliso Simelane wrote that few console games look as "beautifully detailed and borderline photorealistic" as Remastered ; Siliconera's Dinkel compared the cinematography to the work of Roger Deakins and felt the improved character animations enhanced the story, and Variety's Katcy Stephan praised the visual and performance improvements for strengthening the narrative immersion. Some reviewers found the visual changes negligible but unnecessary due to the original's quality. The use of the DualSense's haptic technology was considered by Video Games Chronicle's Middler the best since Astro's Playroom (2020) and by Siliconera's Dinkel the best of any game to date, while Inverse's Kazuma Hashimoto found it strenuous after extended use.

GamingBolt's Shubhankar Parijat considered No Return Remastered's standout feature. Several reviewers found the mode addictive and felt it added value and replayability, demonstrating the quality of the game's combat elements; Push Square's Bayne lauded its pacing and length. Some found the mode incongruous with the narrative's themes discouraging violence and felt it lacked the thematic and narrative justification of God of War Ragnarök's roguelike mode, while others found its gameplay repetitive and upgrades inconsequential. No Return's gameplay elements drew comparisons to the canceled multiplayer game The Last of Us Online. The scrapped levels and audio commentary were praised for providing insight into the development process, named by some as Remastered's standout feature; Push Square's Bayne hoped other developers would imitate it. Several reviewers lauded the US$10 price point for existing owners.

=== Audience response ===
The Last of Us Part II was the subject of review bombing on Metacritic, resulting in a user review score of 3.4/10 at its nadir. Reporters noticed the review bombing occurred shortly after the game launched—too early for users to feasibly have finished it; some suggested that the reviews were based on the incomplete plot leaks. Many negative reviews criticized the characterization and plot; some complained of "social justice warrior" politics, with vitriolic responses to LGBT characters. CNET's Daniel Van Boom wrote that the review bombers did not represent the majority of players, while Kotaku's MacLeod identified thousands of positive reviews and felt Metacritic's system, which emphasizes scores over critique, comprised only "a bunch of meaningless numbers and a lot of rage". The incident led Metacritic to implement a 36-hour waiting period after release before allowing user reviews.

Some players criticized Joel's death in the opening hours, perceiving a discrepancy between his cautious nature in the first game and his more trustful and protective attitude in Part II. Den of Geek's Matthew Byrd wrote that Joel had protected young women in the past, so his trusting of Abby in Part II was not "entirely unreasonable". Sam Clench of News.com.au also argued that Joel's time in Jackson had realistically made him less cynical over the years. A number of players considered Joel's brutal and undignified death "disrespectful"; Clench rebutted that it was realistic, as most real deaths occur at unfortunate times, and described the scene as "extremely strong, purposeful writing". Josh Hawkins of Shacknews wrote that Joel's death was a fitting retribution for his brutal actions and murders in the previous game. Some players felt the marketing, which had altered and replaced characters in trailers to conceal Joel's death and Abby's role, constituted false advertising; Druckmann responded that Naughty Dog had intended to preserve the game experience, "not to bamboozle anyone or get their $60".

A subset of players criticized Abby and disapproved of her playable chapters as they had expected to control Ellie for the majority of the game. Collider's Dave Trumbore felt Abby's killing of Joel led to her being unfairly maligned by audiences who had failed to understand the story's message. Some players criticized Abby's muscular physique, and theories spread online that she was transgender; The Independent's Amy Coles and Polygon's Patricia Hernandez argued that this perception was a result of the lack of body diversity in games, and that the story showed Abby had the resources to achieve her physique. Coles observed that these arguments were propagated by "a loud and determinedly misogynistic subset" of players. Laura Bailey, who played Abby, became the target of online death threats in response to the character; Naughty Dog released a statement condemning the threats, and Bailey was supported by James Gunn, Ashley Johnson, and Craig Mazin, among others.

Some members of the transgender community objected to the representation of Lev, a transgender supporting character. Criticism focused on villains using Lev's deadname, that the character was created by cisgender writers, and the use of trans stories as tragedies. Stacey Henley of VG247 responded that Lev's deadname is used sparingly and that Ian Alexander, a transgender actor, provides the character's voice and motion capture. Writing for Paste, Waverly praised the choice to have Lev played by a transgender actor, but felt there was too much emphasis on his gender identity and the suffering he experienced for it. Waverly felt that "Lev's story isn't made for trans people, but to give cisgender players a space to connect with their guilt and pity for trans people". Henley wrote that, while Lev's story is imperfect, it is "a major step for trans characters in gaming, [and] focuses on a highly charismatic and central character who is far more than this transness". Kotaku's MacLeod saw Lev's character as simply a way of acknowledging that trans people exist in the game's universe and wrote that it was up to the player to create their own meaning from the character. Alexander acknowledged the writers "might have missed the mark a little bit" regarding the use of Lev's deadname but felt Abby's response (Note: After enemies use Lev's deadname, Lev asks Abby "Do you want to ask me about it?" to which Abby responds "Do you want me to ask you about it?") reflected the importance of allowing trans individuals the agency to discuss their gender on their own terms.

A year after the game's release, Collider's Trumbore identified a subset of players that continued to criticize the game and its legacy, comparing it to some audience complaints about Star Wars: The Last Jedi (2017), though recognized it was "quieter" than at launch. In Games and Culture, Robert Letizi and Callan Norman described a community of users on the subreddit r/TheLastOfUs2 who continued posting hateful and discriminatory content denouncing the game several years after release as "alt-fans". Letizi and Norman linked the reception to the game to alt-right politics and various hate movements and conspiracy theories; they argued the response to Part II was not an outlier but an exemplar of common politically motivated responses to inclusivity in games. In July 2021, a user of the subreddit claimed they received death threats from fans of YouTube channel Girlfriend Reviews, who had posted positive videos about the game; following targeted harassment from the subreddit, Girlfriend Reviews discovered the threats were fabricated by the user.

=== Developer response ===
Polygon's Hernandez observed that the discourse surrounding The Last of Us Part II had become adversarial, with "bigots" attacking the game for its diverse cast and Naughty Dog becoming defensive. Vice's Zacny claimed that, in response to his critical review, Sony contacted him on behalf of Naughty Dog to discuss his criticisms, which they disagreed with; Zacny said the discussion, while cordial, was unusual from a large publisher. On Twitter, Druckmann expressed disapproval after journalist Jason Schreier mocked a reviewer's comparison of Part II to Schindler's List (1993); Schreier felt his reporting on Naughty Dog's crunch conditions prompted Druckmann's disapproval. A different tweet from Schreier stated that "video games are too long", which he later clarified was criticizing longer games being made for marketing purposes; Baker responded to the original tweet with a quote from US president Theodore Roosevelt about critics being less valuable than creators, which Schreier felt was an overreaction. Hernandez concluded that critics fearing backlash from publishers and fans was "not an environment that is conducive to encouraging honest reviews or critical discussion, which is ultimately a disservice to the game itself". USgamer's Bailey wrote that the strict review embargo prevented meaningful discussion of the narrative. Druckmann acknowledged the leaks prompted the embargo as he had felt reviews discussing plot details would have become more harmful and widespread than the leaks.

=== Accolades ===
The Last of Us Part II won 326 Game of the Year awards, according to tracking websites, which several outlets reported broke the record set by The Witcher 3: Wild Hunt (2015); it was later surpassed by Elden Ring (2022). The game was awarded from outlets and shows such as Den of Geek, Digital Trends, Electronic Gaming Monthly, Empire, Entertainment Weekly, Game Informer, PlayStation Blog, Push Square, and the Titanium Awards. It was named runner-up by several other publications. At the 38th Golden Joystick Awards in November 2020, it won all six awards for which it was nominated: Ultimate Game of the Year, Best Audio, Best Storytelling, Best Visual Design, PlayStation Game of the Year, and Studio of the Year for Naughty Dog. It led the nominees for the Game Awards 2020 with eleven nominations, of which it won seven, the most in the show's history to date: (Note: The Last of Us Part II's eleven nomination record was tied by God of War Ragnarök at the Game Awards 2022 and beaten by Clair Obscur: Expedition 33's thirteen nominations in 2025. Its seven win record was beaten by Clair Obscur: Expedition 33's nine wins in 2025.) Game of the Year, Best Game Direction, Best Narrative, Best Audio Design, Innovation in Accessibility, Best Action/Adventure, and Best Performance (for Bailey).

The Last of Us Part II was nominated for twenty-four awards at the National Academy of Video Game Trade Reviewers Awards, the most in the show's history; it won eight, including Outstanding Direction in a Game Cinema, Franchise Adventure Game, Lead Performance in a Drama (for Johnson and Bailey), and Supporting Performance in a Drama (for Baker). It was nominated for thirteen awards at the 17th British Academy Games Awards, the most in the show's history, winning for Animation, the publicly voted EE Game of the Year, and Performer in a Leading Role (for Bailey). It led the nominees at the 24th Annual D.I.C.E. Awards with eleven nominations, of which it won two: Outstanding Achievement in Animation and Outstanding Achievement in Story. It also led the 19th Annual Game Audio Network Guild Awards with fifteen nominations and eight wins, and the 21st Game Developers Choice Awards with six nominations, (Note: Tied with Ghost of Tsushima and Hades) of which it won one. It received the most nominations at the inaugural Global Industry Game Awards with thirteen, of which it won three: 3D Animation, Cinematography, and Story.

== Sales ==
In its release weekend, The Last of Us Part II sold over four million copies worldwide, becoming the fastest-selling PlayStation 4 exclusive, beating Marvel's Spider-Man's 3.3 million and God of War's 3.1 million in the same period. It had the biggest launch of 2020 for both physical and digital sales. On the PlayStation Store, it was the most-downloaded PlayStation 4 game in North America and Europe in June; in July, it was fifth in North America and tenth in Europe; in November, it was the eighth in North America and seventh in Europe; and overall for 2020, it ranked sixth in North America and eighth in Europe. In the United States, it was the best-selling game of June 2020 and became the third-best-selling game of the year within two weeks, generating the highest first-month sales of the year. By August 2020, it had become the third-highest-grossing PlayStation game in the United States, behind Marvel's Spider-Man and God of War. Overall, it was the sixth-best-selling game of the year in the United States; it was the third-best-selling for PlayStation consoles, and the best-selling PlayStation 4-only game. By June 2022, the game had sold over ten million copies worldwide.

In the United Kingdom, The Last of Us Part II became the fastest-selling physical PlayStation 4 game, outselling previous record holder Uncharted 4 by at least one percent and The Last of Us by 76 percent; it was the nation's eighth-best-selling game of the year with 543,218 copies sold, and the seventh for physical sales. A price discount in February 2021 saw it re-enter the UK physical charts in third place, representing a 3,992 percent increase. In Japan, The Last of Us Part II was the best-selling game during its first week, selling an estimated 178,696 physical copies. In Germany, it sold over 200,000 copies in June 2020 and 500,000 by December 2020. In Australia, it was the eighth-best-selling of the year, and the third for physical sales. Remastered debuted at third on the physical sales chart in the United Kingdom for the first week and second for January, beating Part I's launch by more than 150%.

== Legacy ==
Critics concurred that The Last of Us Part II was among the best games of the eighth generation of video game consoles and a great closing title before the ninth. An internal review by Sony's competitor Microsoft—published as a court document in the Epic Games v. Apple lawsuit in 2021—said the game "sets a new bar for what we should hope to be able to achieve going into a new generation of consoles". Many outlets considered it among the greatest video games ever made, and some called it one of the best-written.

The Last of Us Part II is being adapted into multiple seasons of the television adaptation of The Last of Us, starting with the second season, which premiered in April 2025. The second season covers the story in Jackson and Ellie's three days in Seattle, while the third is expected to shift perspective to Abby; showrunner Craig Mazin suspected the story may require a fourth. Pedro Pascal, Bella Ramsey, and Gabriel Luna reprise their first-season roles as Joel, Ellie, and Tommy, joined in the second season by Kaitlyn Dever as Abby, Young Mazino as Jesse, Isabela Merced as Dina, and Jeffrey Wright as Isaac, reprising his role from the game, and in the third season by Michelle Mao and Kyriana Kratter as Yara and Lev.

Druckmann and Gross wrote an outline for a story set after Part II by April 2021, but noted it was not in active development. Druckmann later clarified the outline was for a "small story" focused on Tommy, rather than a full sequel to Part II ; he felt it would eventually be released, possibly as a game or television series. In 2023, Druckmann confirmed he had a concept for a third main game in the series that is thematically consistent with the first two games, stating there is "probably one more chapter to this story". In March 2025, Druckmann warned not to "bet on there being more of Last of Us ", noting the television series "could be it". A year later, Druckmann noted that "few stops that remain on the road ahead", which some interpreted as a possible hint to a sequel.
